= Bracken Hall Countryside Centre and Museum =

Museum and nature centre in England

Coordinates: 53°50′50″N 1°48′04″W

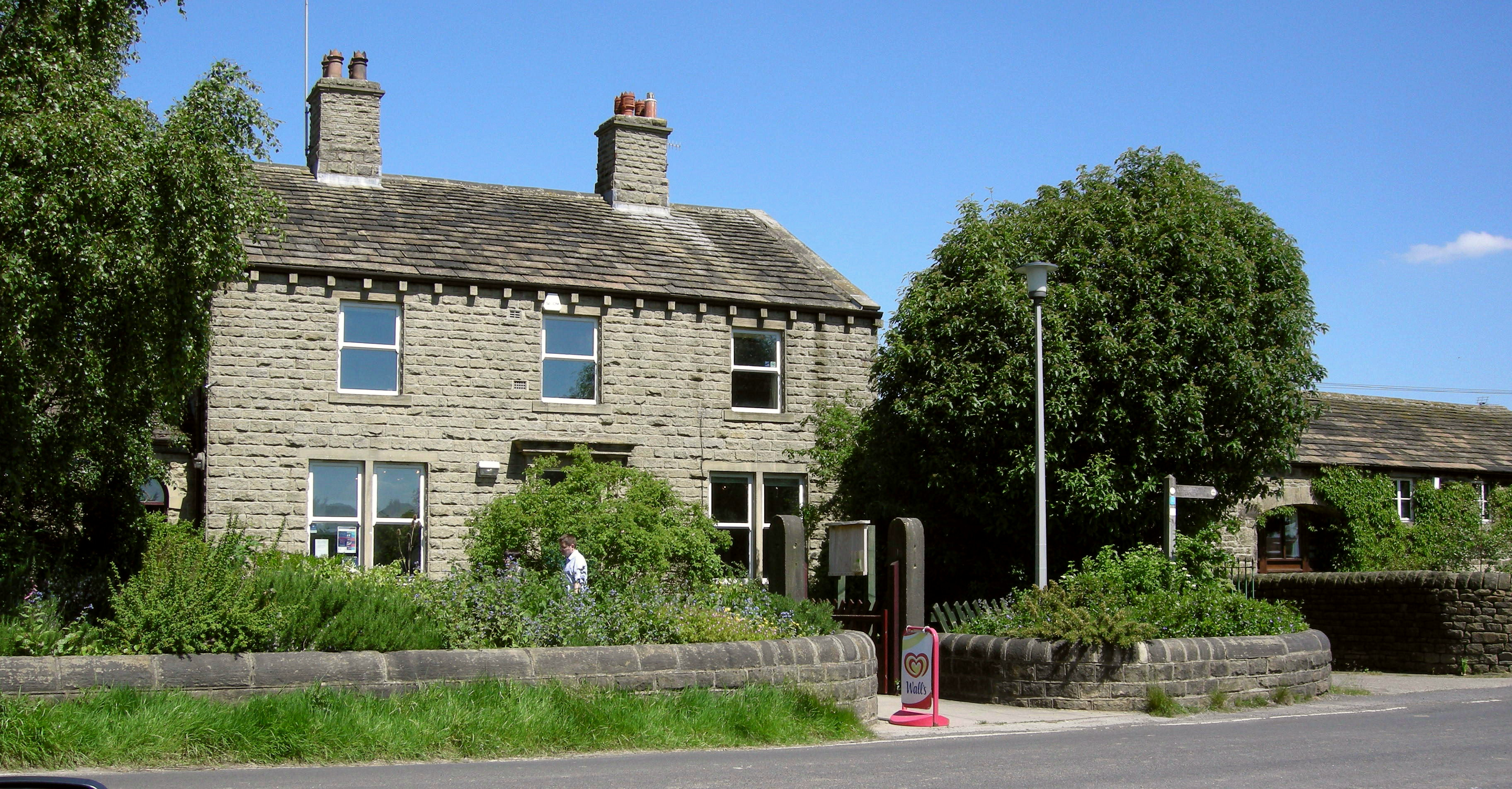
- Bracken Hall Museum
- Established: Early 1980s; 1989 at Bracken Hall.
- Location: Glen Road, Baildon, Shipley, West Yorkshire, England BD17 5EA
- Type: Children's museum, Natural history museum, Local archaeology museum, Interpretation centre
- Public transit access: Shipley Glen Tramway or bus from Bradford Interchange
- Website: The Friends of Bracken Hall

Bracken Hall Countryside Centre and Museum is a children's museum, natural history education centre and nature centre established in 1989 at Bracken Hall on the edge of Baildon Moor, close to Shipley Glen in West Yorkshire, England.

In 2013 the Bradford Council removed their funding of the museum. The Friends of Bracken Hall worked to gather support in order to reopen the museum, and whilst the centre was planned to re-open in late 2015, it was finally re-opened to the public in April 2016 with the help of Baildon Town Council.

== Site layout ==
=== Museum building and front garden ===
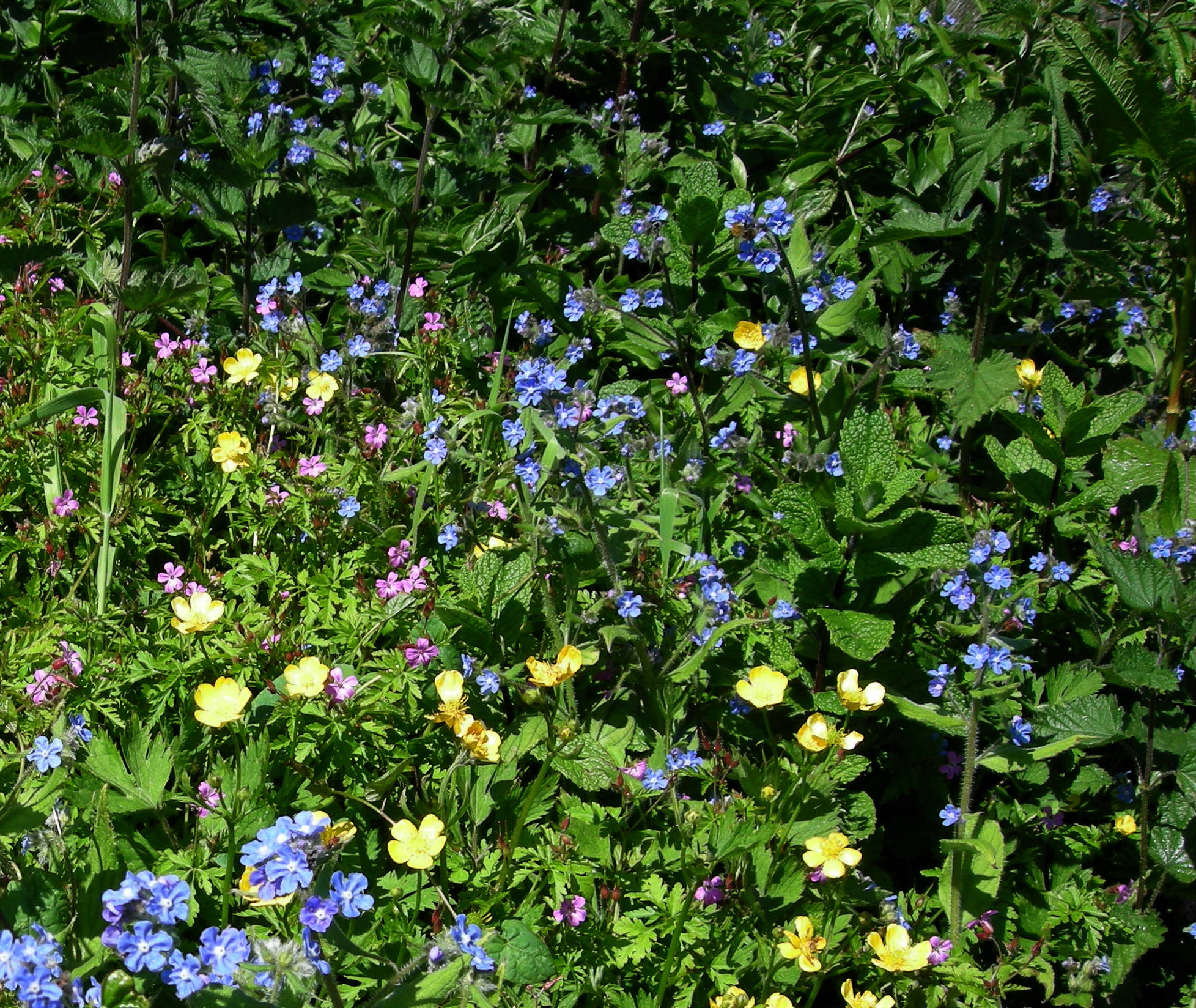
Pentaglottis sempervirens; Geranium robertianum; Ranunculus repens.

==== Building ====
This c. 1890s Yorkshire gritstone building was once a bailiff's house, then a farm house, and it still has the original big, old, panelled front door. It is of the traditional rural, symmetrical, four-up, four-down domestic design which was common in the Georgian era and continued throughout the 19th century. This type of house has two rooms each side of the front door, stairs in the middle leading back from the front door, and two upstairs bedrooms each side of the stairwell, with a 19th-century dressing room above the front hall. The walls between front and back rooms are load-bearing, and supported by the two chimneys, which allow fireplaces in all eight main rooms. Bradford City Council has built an extra ground-floor room onto the left hand side, and this contains the museum entrance door and reception. The two original downstairs front rooms are now the Archaeology room and Exhibition room. The public cannot see the two downstairs back rooms, the stairs or the upstairs rooms, which are now accessed from behind the reception desk; therefore the public has access to just a quarter of the original building. The back door leads from the new entrance room to the back garden and the toilets.

==== Museum layout ====
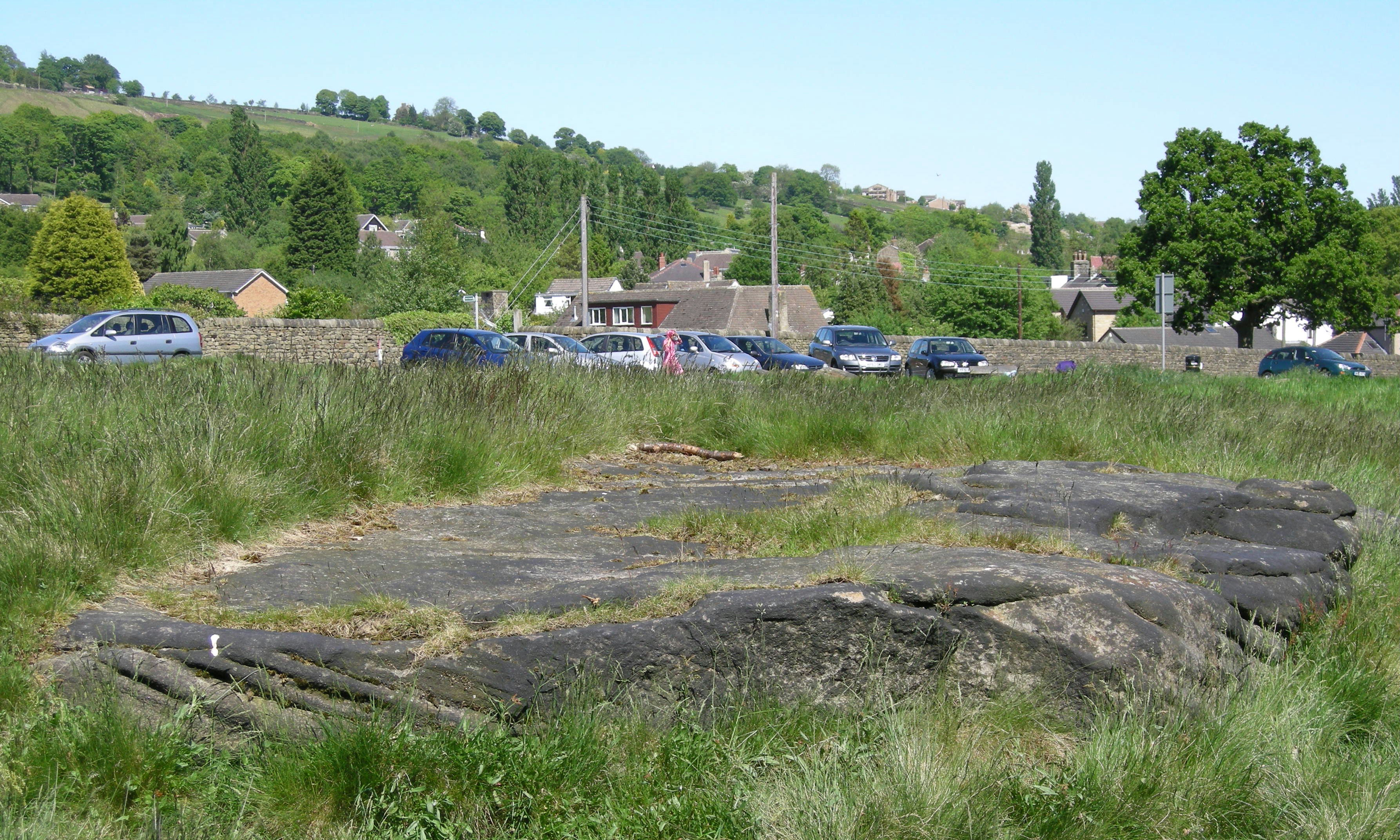
Baildon Moor and parking, opposite Bracken Hall.

This children's museum and countryside centre specialises in interactive displays for all ages, indoor and out. When the museum is open, the public can walk through the ground floor rooms of the museum, and through the back and front gardens which are dedicated to wildlife discovery. The whole site and surrounding moor and glen are used for public groups on Wild Wednesdays and on guided walks, and for school groups when the museum is closed to the public: all these groups by appointment.

==== Front garden ====
This changes with the seasons. In May and June there are many wild flowers, including green alkanet, herb Robert and creeping buttercup. There are bird feeders which attract various finches and tits, and an animal hutch for a rabbit or guinea pig. There is a double gate so that the animal could occasionally be safely let out to graze under staff supervision.

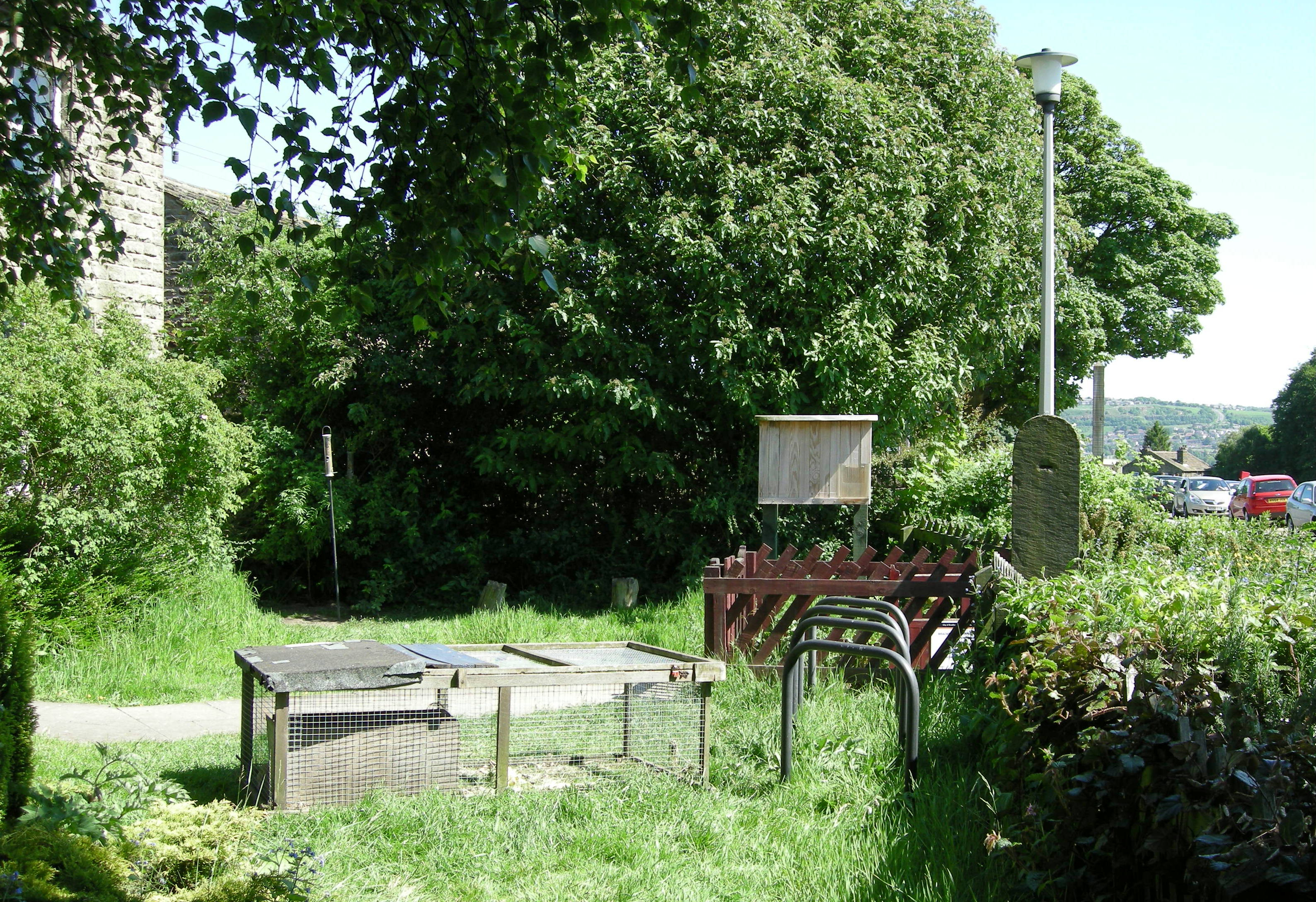
Front garden with Shipley in the distance.

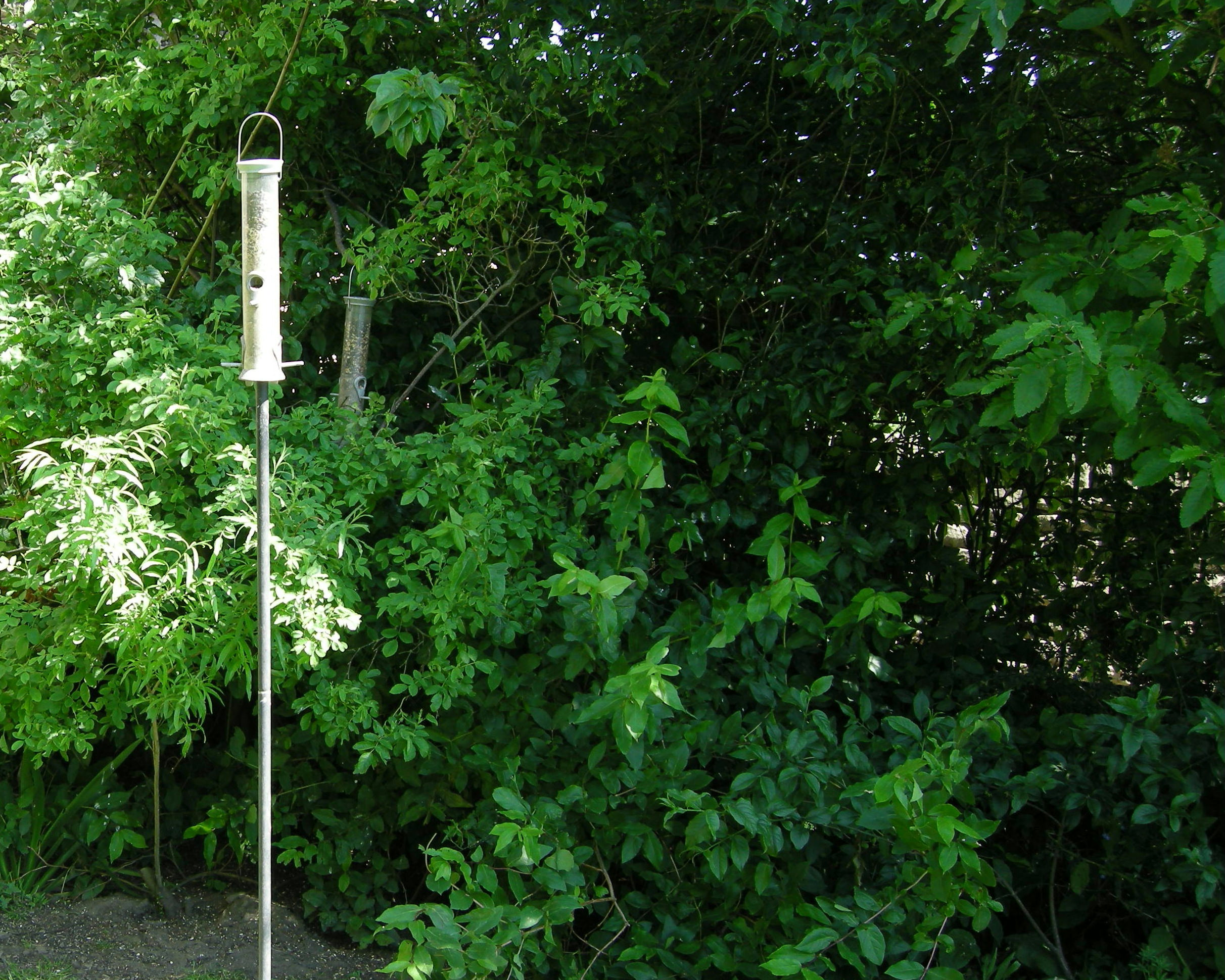
Bird feeders.

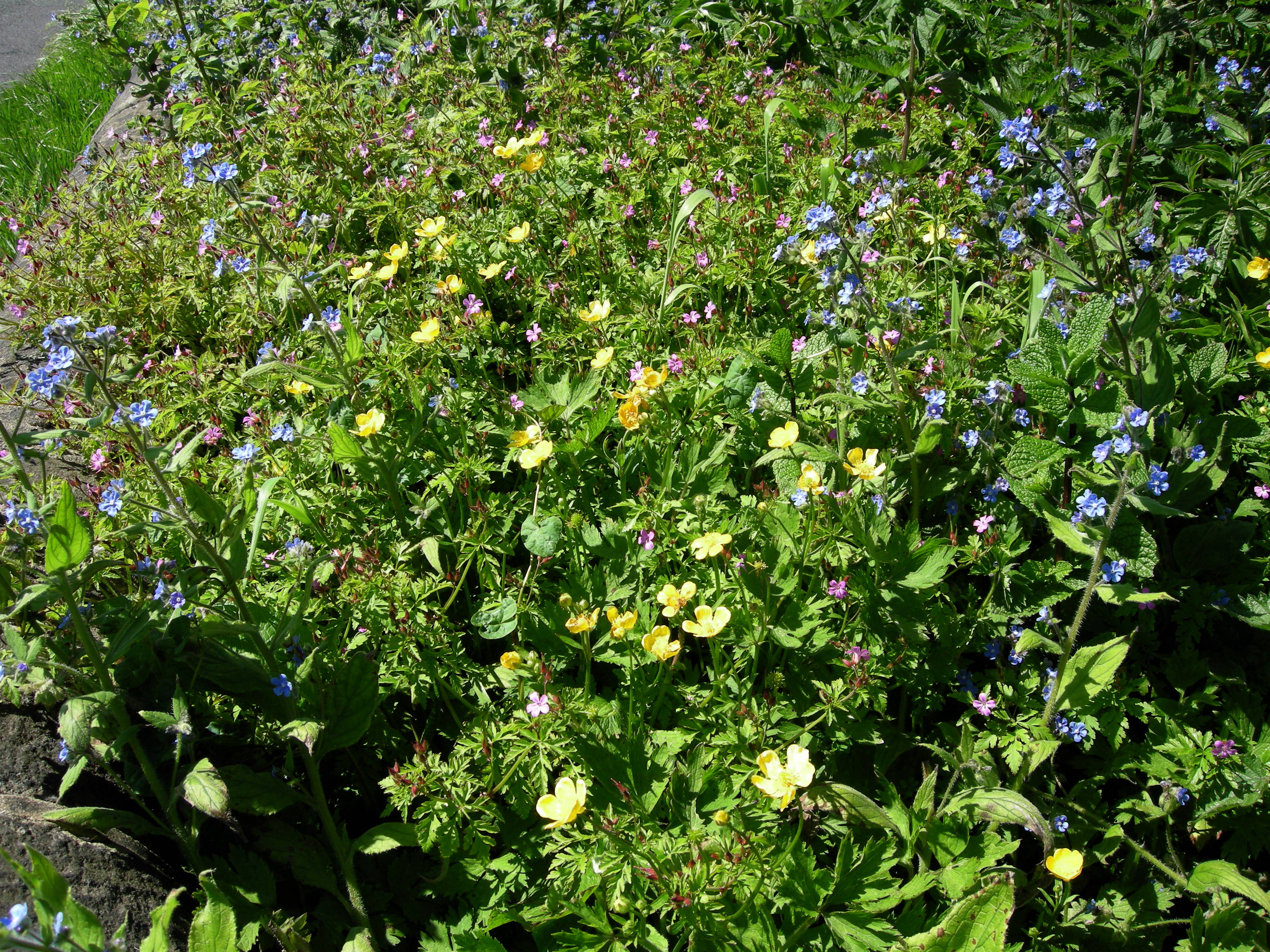
Green alkanet, herb Robert and creeping buttercup.

=== Entrance room ===
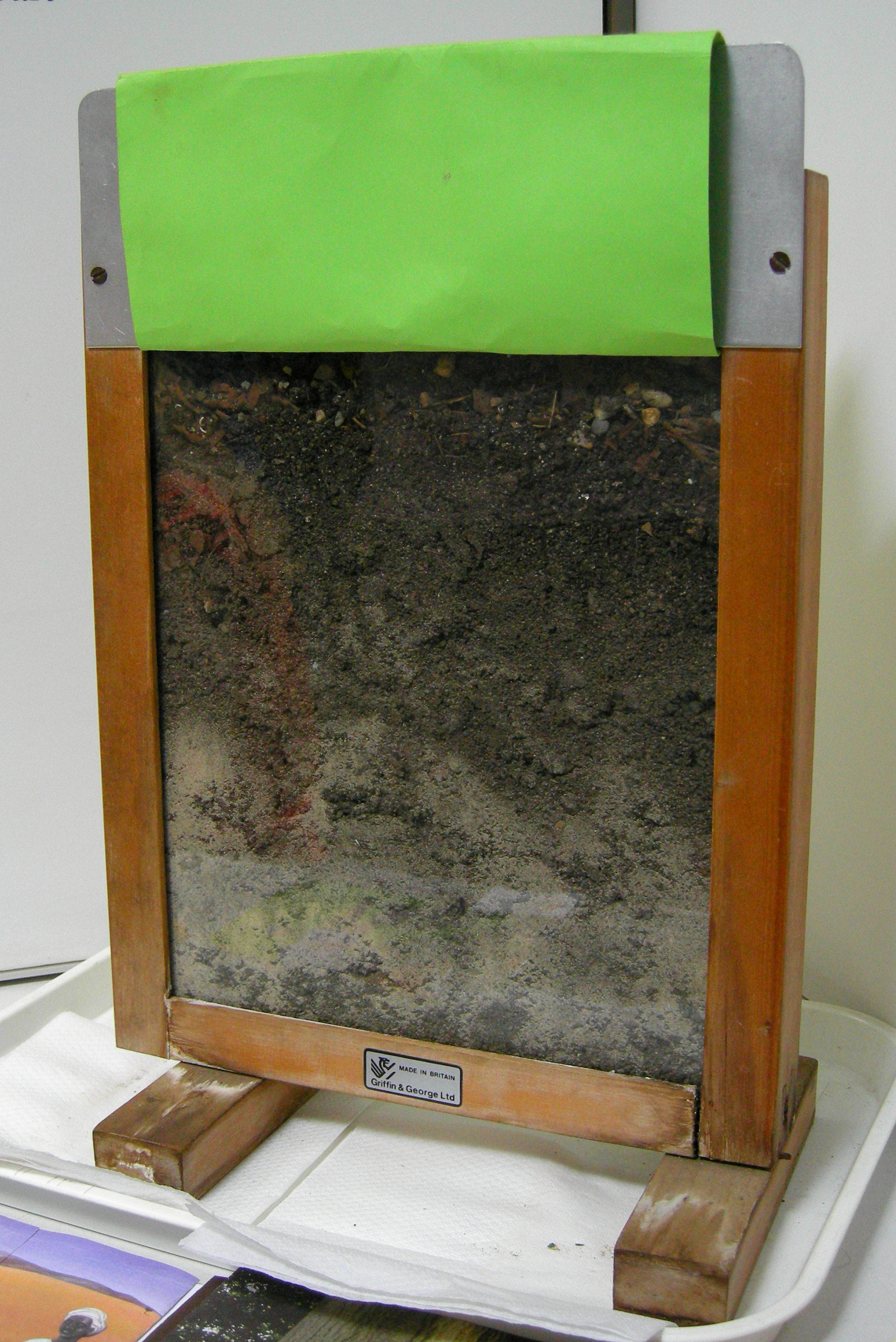
Wormery.

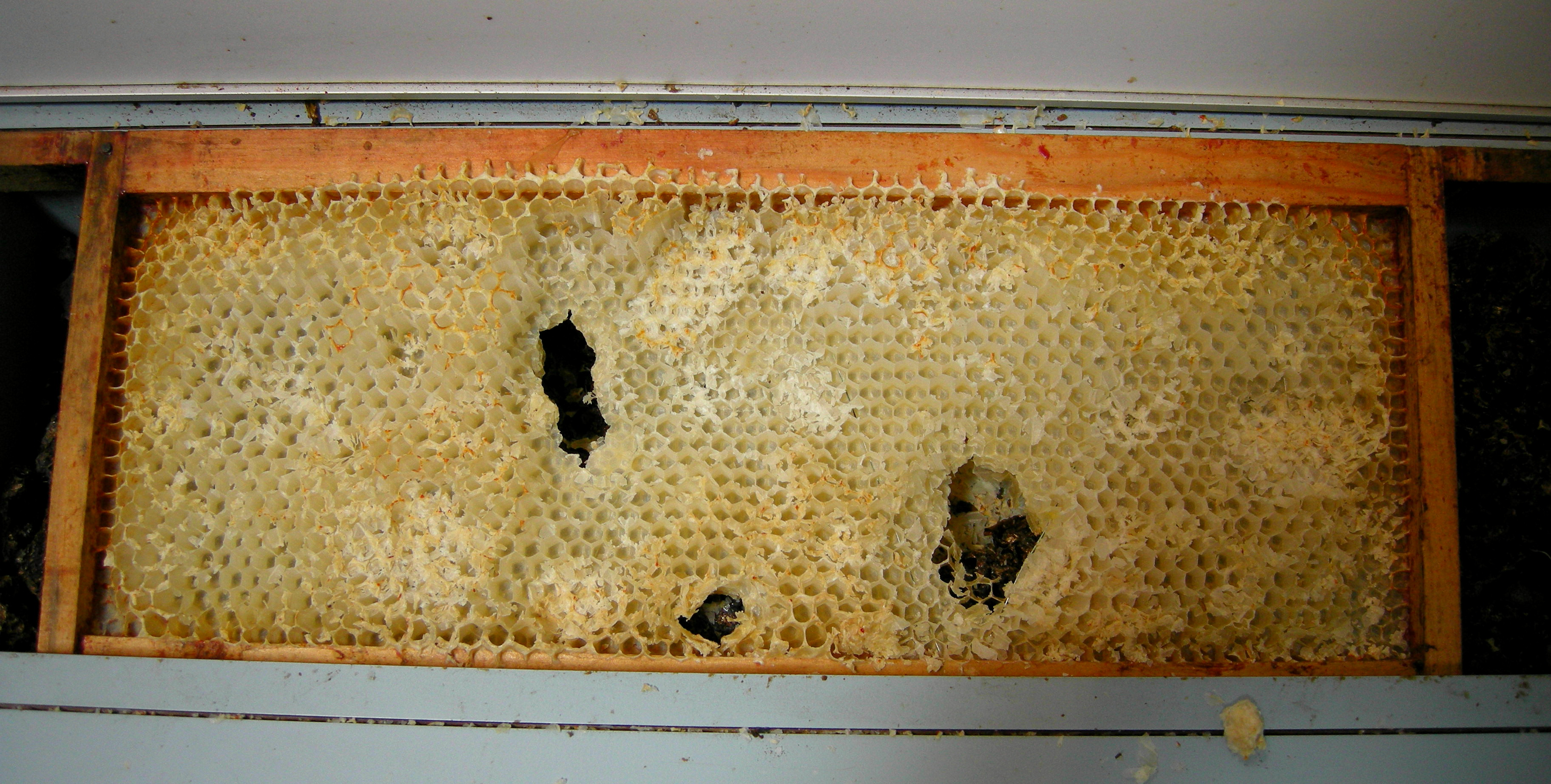
Honeycomb from beehive, for children to handle.

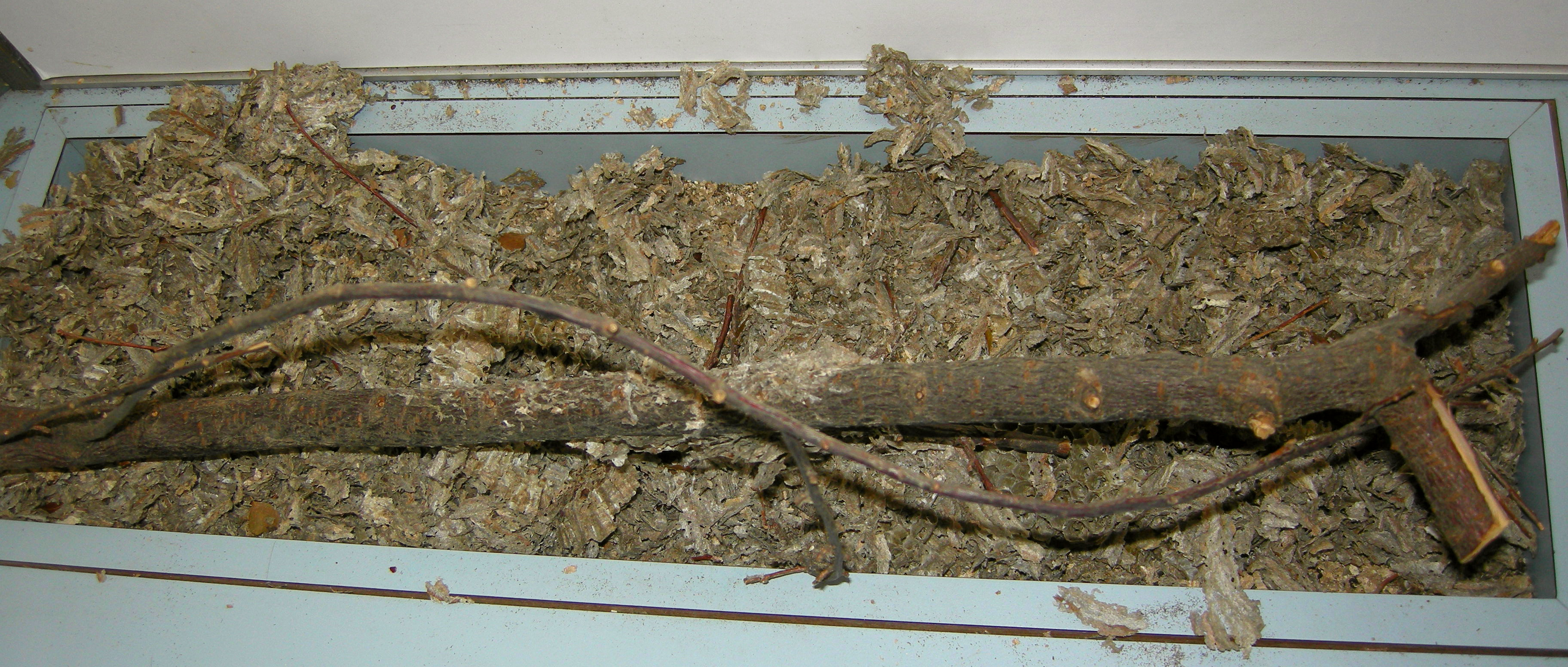
Wasp nest (remains of), for children to handle.

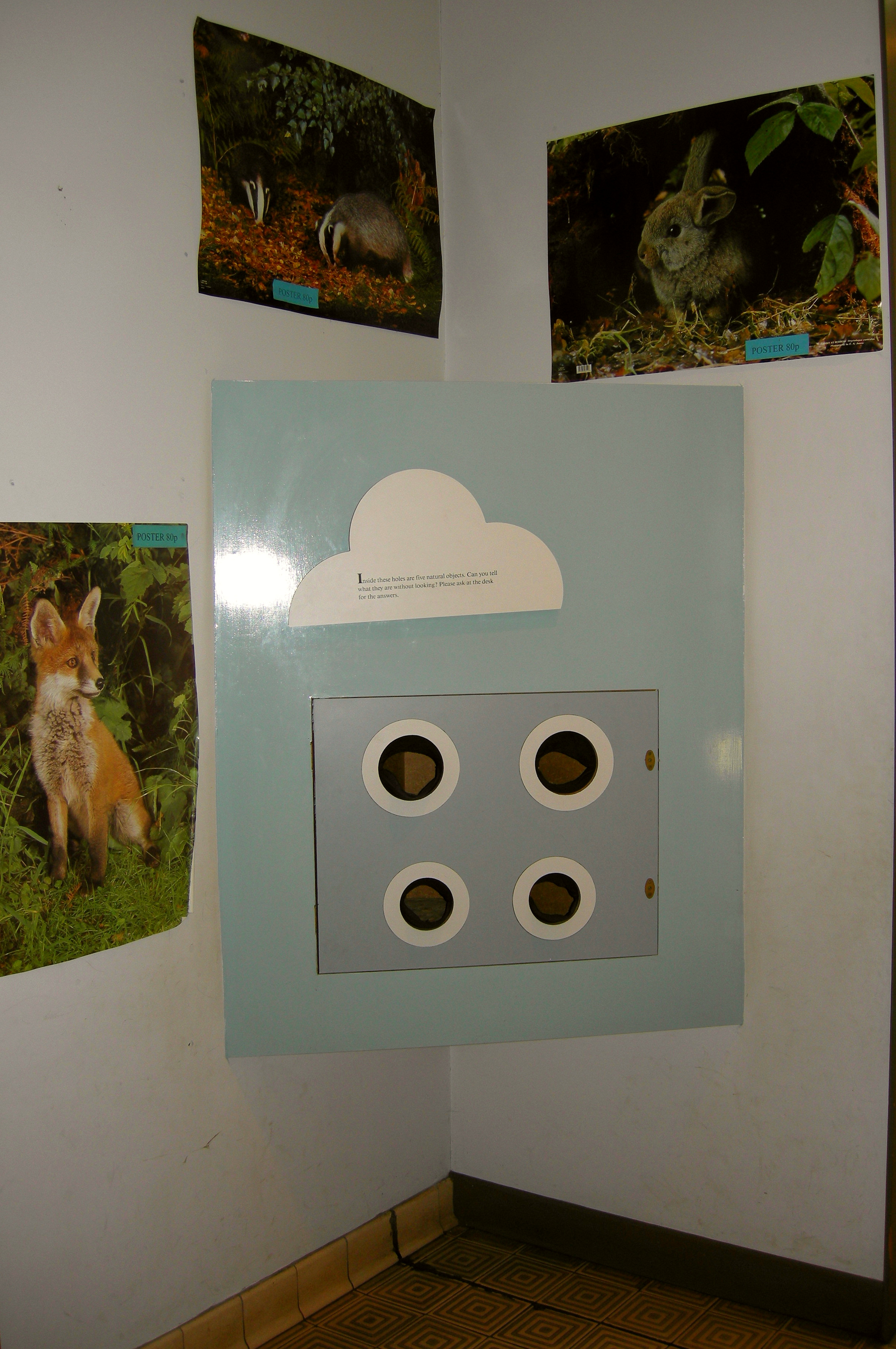
Put hands in holes to identify natural objects by touch.

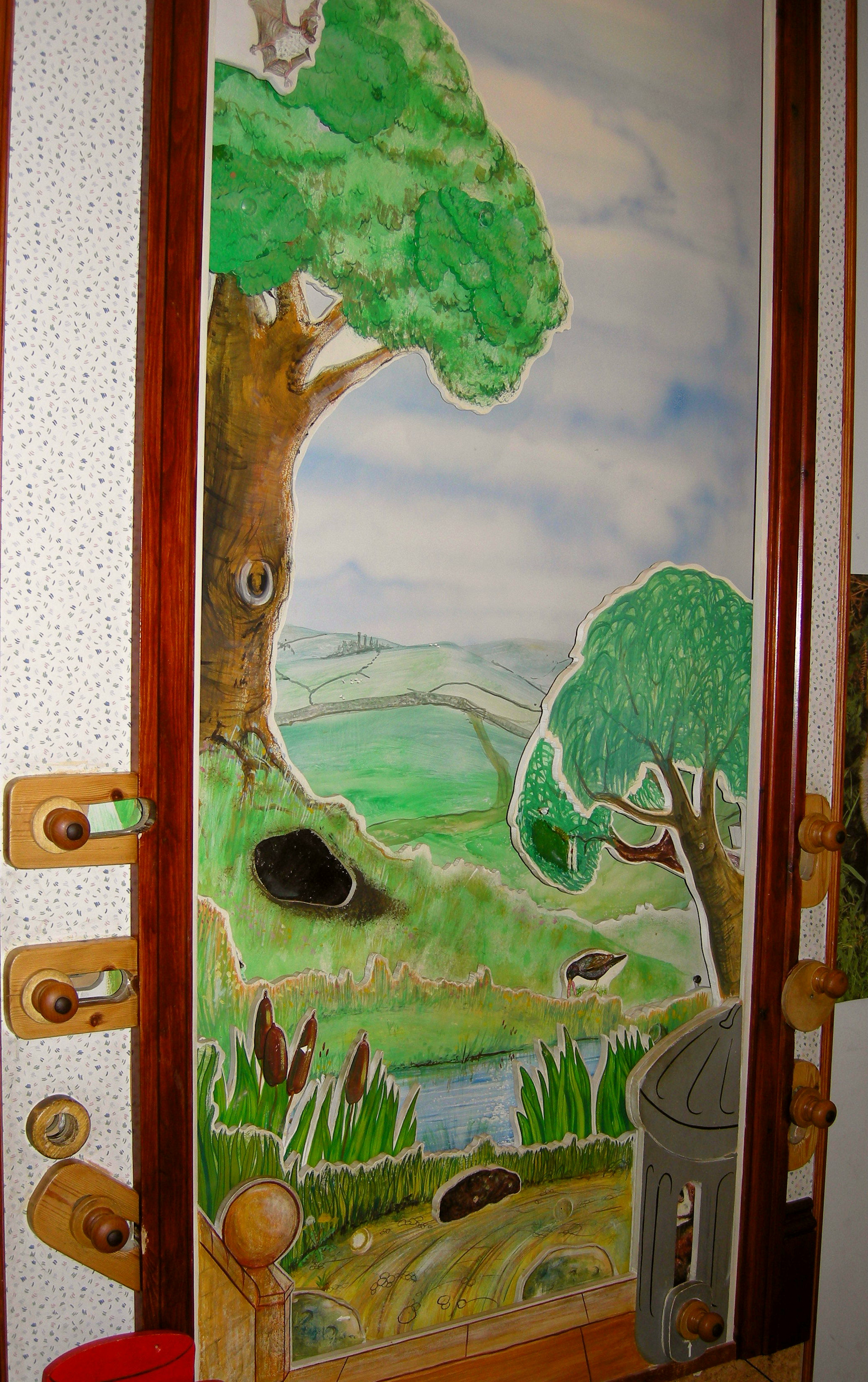
Interactive wildlife pop-up board for young children.

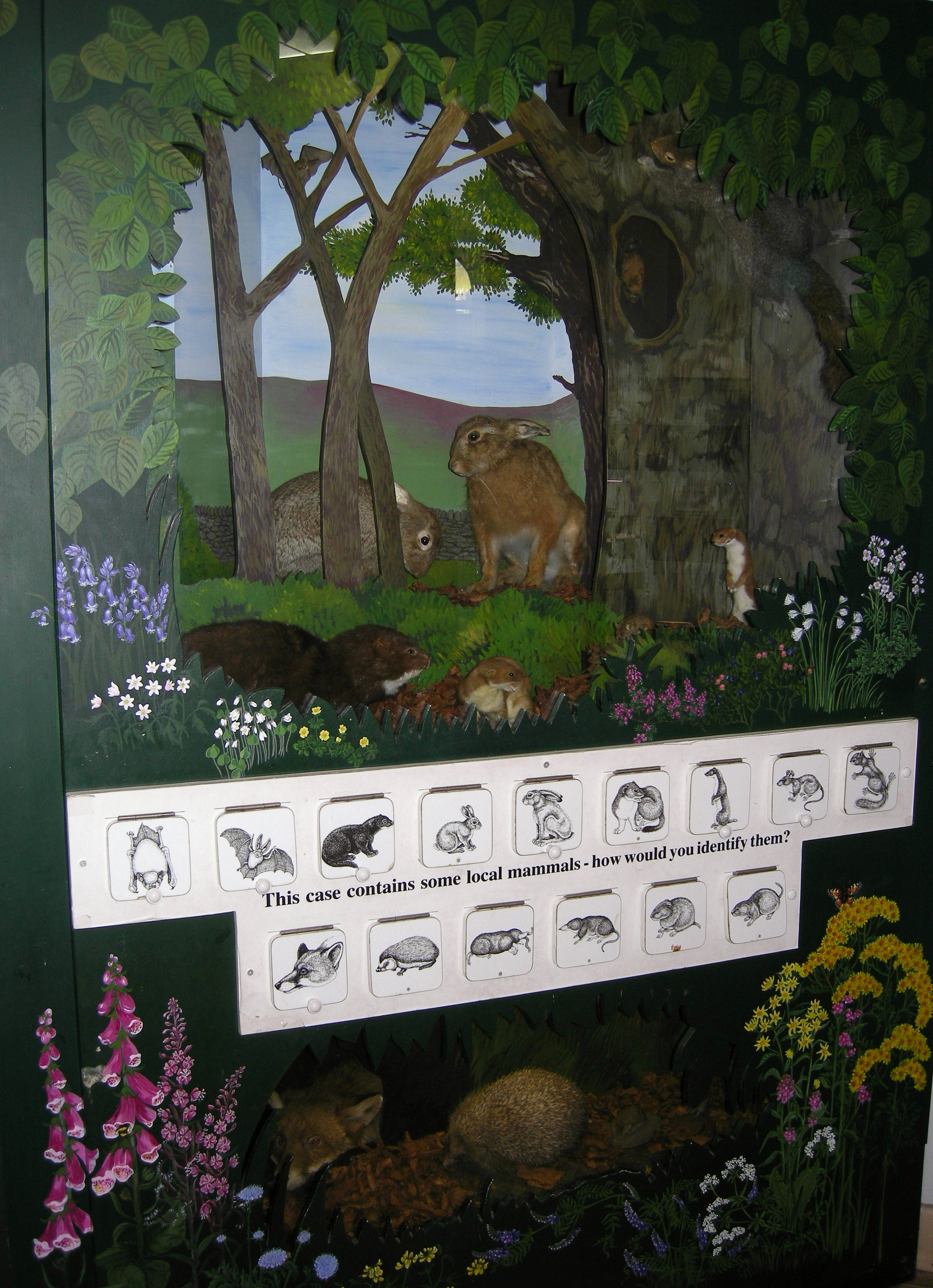
Interactive wildlife identification display for children.

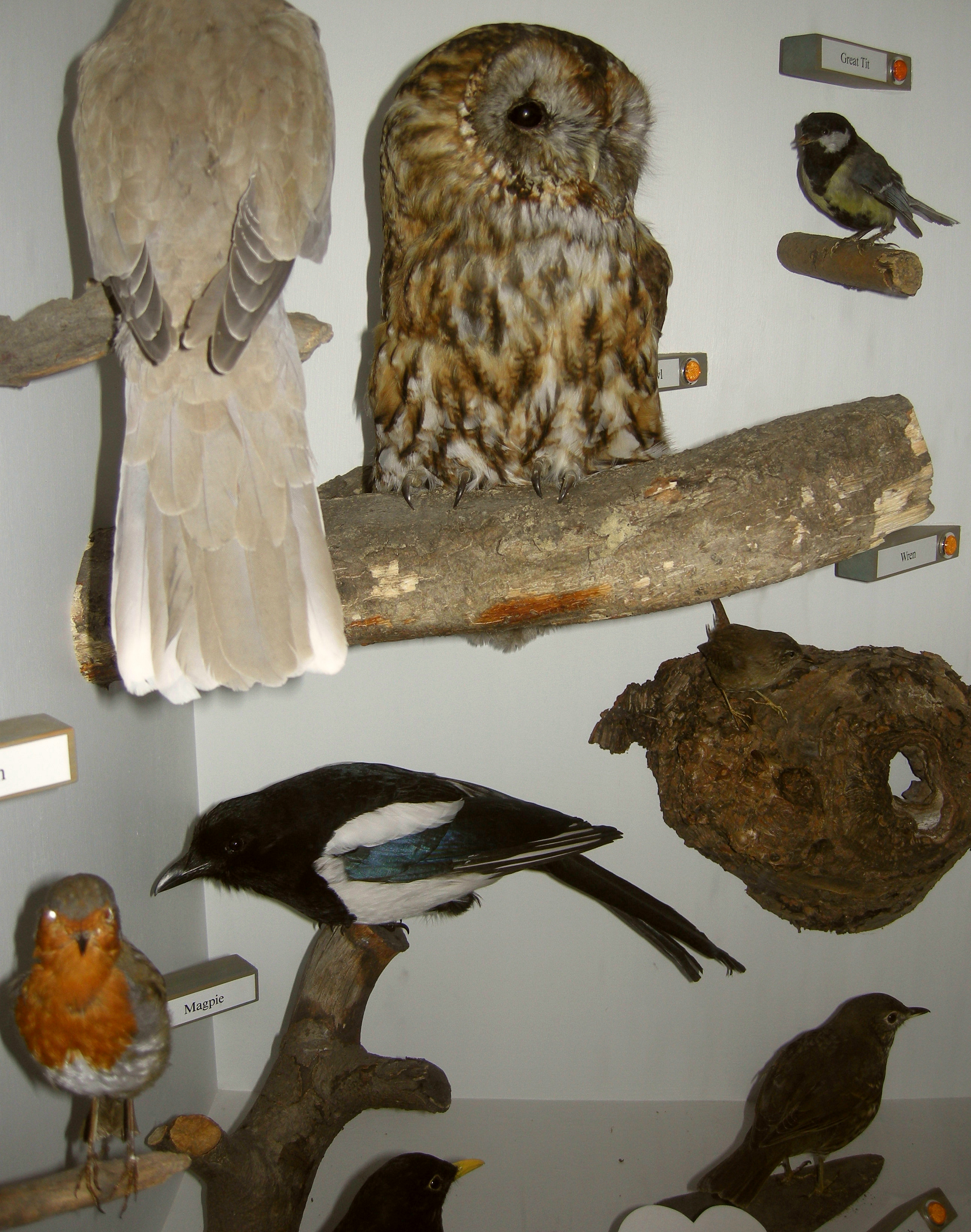
Garden birds in safety glass, fixed low down for children.

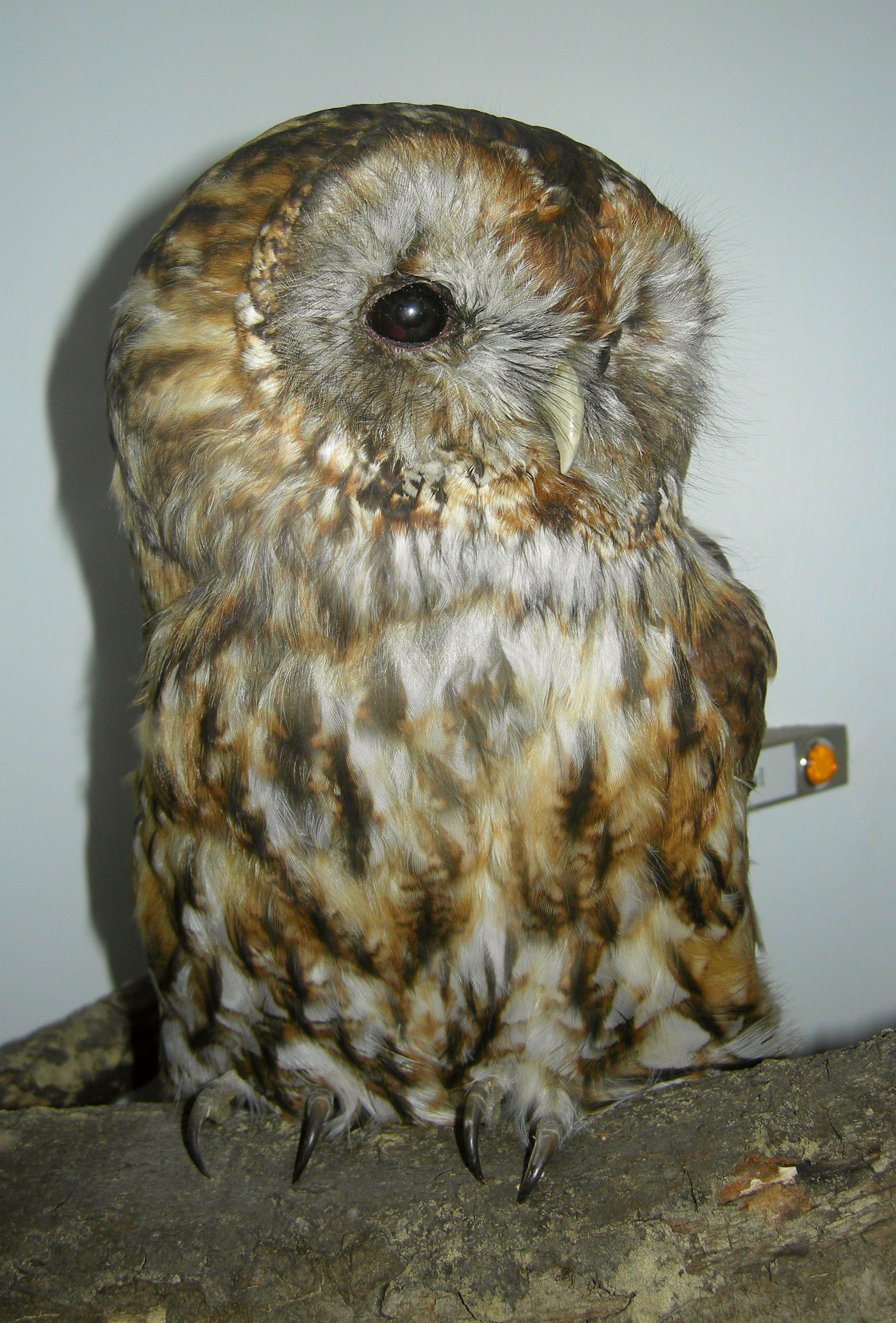
Close up of the mounted tawny owl.

Due to the vigorously interactive nature of children, and the transient nature of wildlife, some of the following displays will be regularly replaced with other items of interest.

==== Video microscope ====
In the Entrance room next to Reception is a six-foot-high, interactive video microscope. You place a dish of natural objects (for example houseflies) on the lighted tray at the bottom, and move it around until it shows in the video screen at the top. The tray is at child-height to enable youngsters to take part. On the screen a housefly looks bigger than your hand, so that its details might be observed easily.

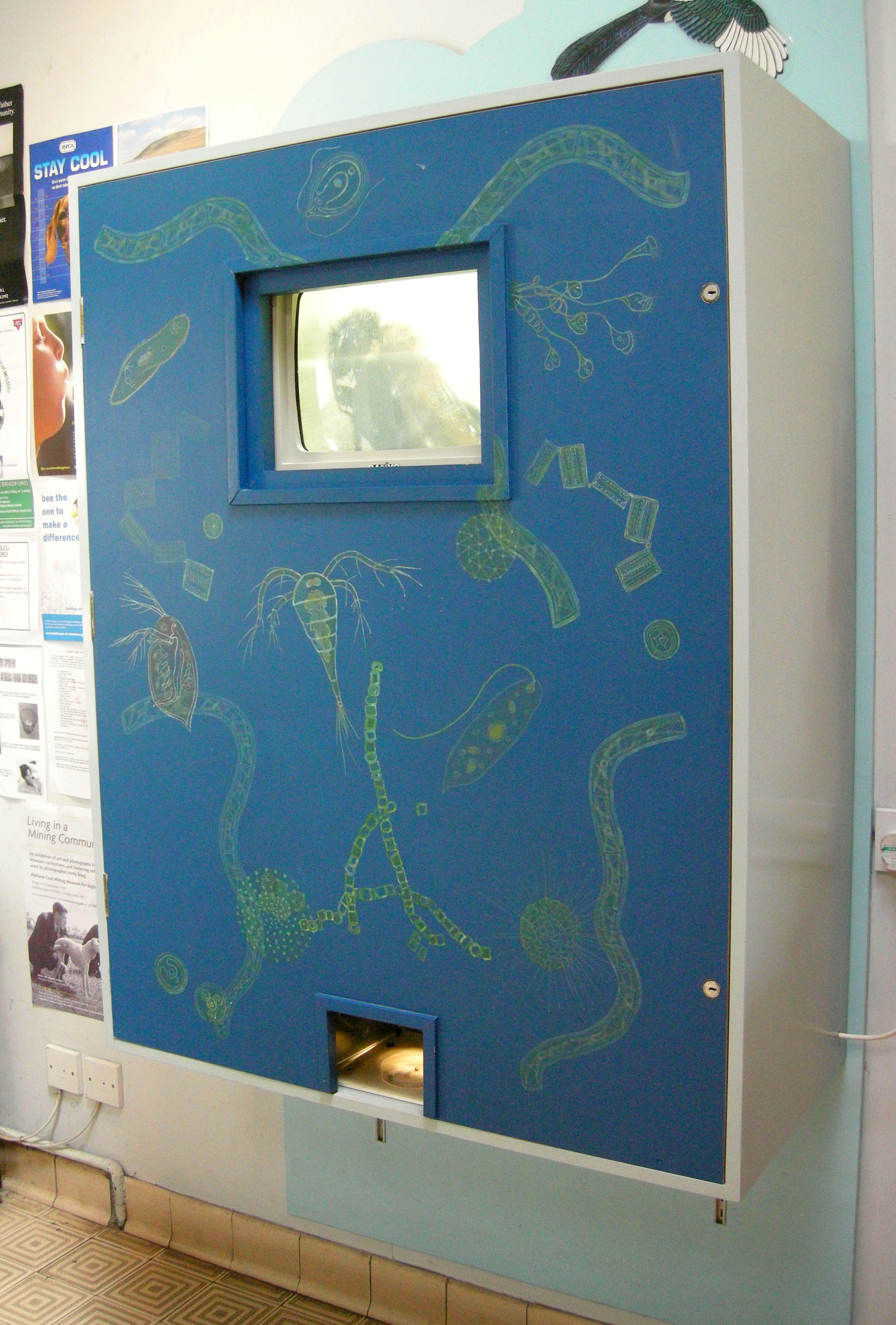
Large interactive video microscope.

==== Fishtanks and wormery ====
Along the back wall is a gallery of fishtanks, containing (depending on availability) animals such as tadpoles, bullheads, goldfish and water fleas. In the far corner of the back wall is a wormery.

==== Honeycomb and remains of wasp nest ====
On the wall opposite Reception there used to be an indoor beehive with an observation panel for the children, but it was dismantled due to colony collapse disorder. It has been replaced with an information board about bees, and a honeycomb for the children to handle. The wall-display explains bee hierarchy, bee behaviour and hive structure. There is also an information board about wasps. Like the bee board, this board explains behaviour and nest structure, but it also mentions the wasp's usefulness in organic pest control. Below it are the remains of a wasp nest so that the children can compare the papery and waxy textures of the nest and honeycomb.

==== Computer nature guide and ID-by-touch box ====
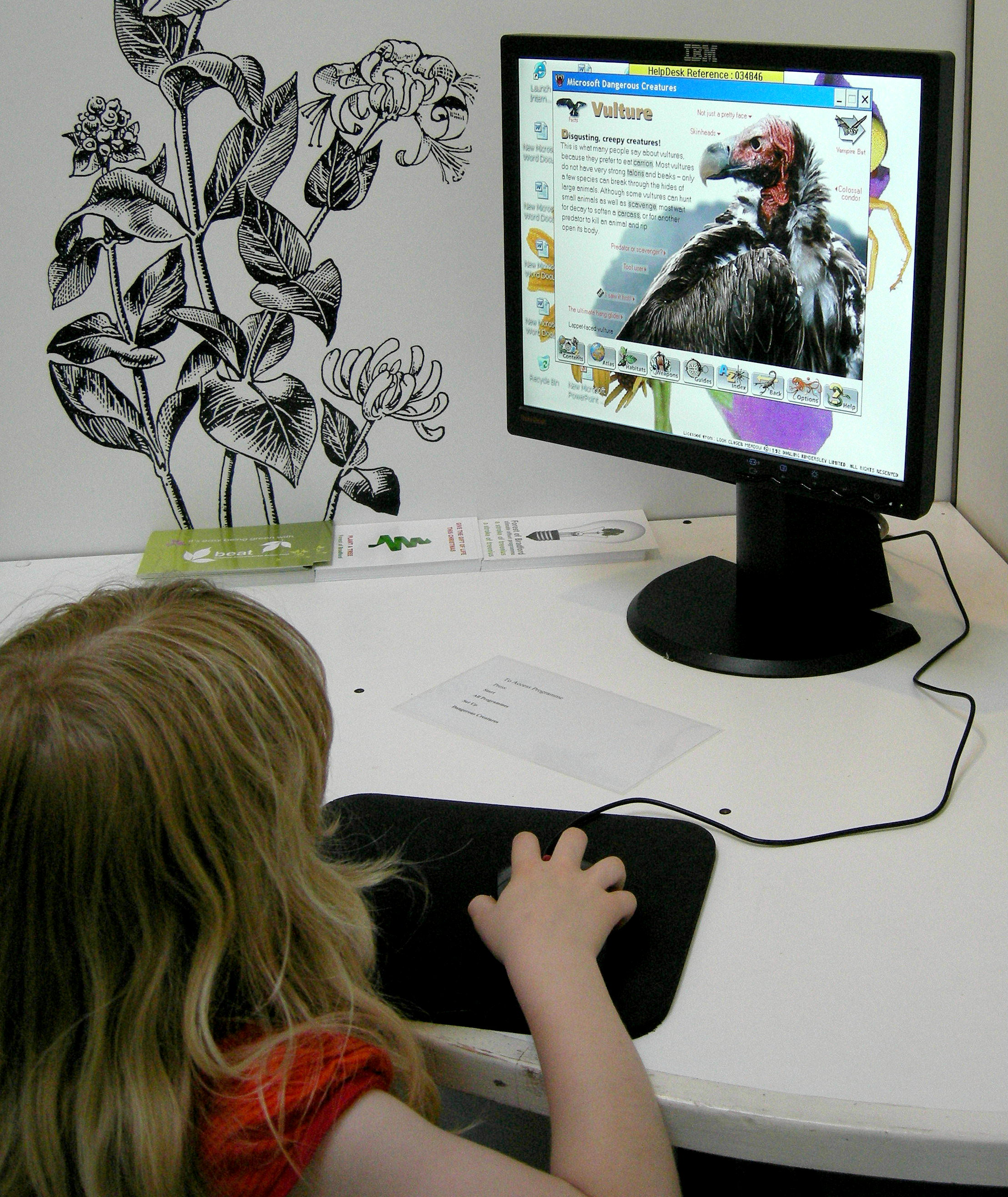
Computer Nature guide.

This computer uses a Dangerous Creatures CD-ROM, a program for children which allows them to learn about wildlife outside the UK while being entertained. It is situated halfway along the wall opposite Reception. Near the computer is an identification-by-touch display of natural objects.

==== Interactive animal ID displays ====
On the same side wall opposite Reception there are two interactive boards. One, made of painted plywood, is for young children, and has large wooden handles which cause rabbits, birds and other animals to pop up out of holes in the screen. The other is for slightly older children, and contains safety-glass panels with pictured or mounted animals behind. There is a row of wooden flaps painted with animal pictures. The children try to name the animals, then lift the flaps to read the names.

==== Mounted birds in glass case ====
This safety-glass display is behind the entrance door, and set low enough for young children to see some of the mounted birds at eye-level. It contains garden birds, a wren's nest and a tawny owl. This display plays birdsong recordings, which young children can learn quickly. This serves as an introduction to pishing.

==== Reception ====
Staff at the Reception desk have answer-cards for the various quizzes.

=== Local archaeology and history room ===
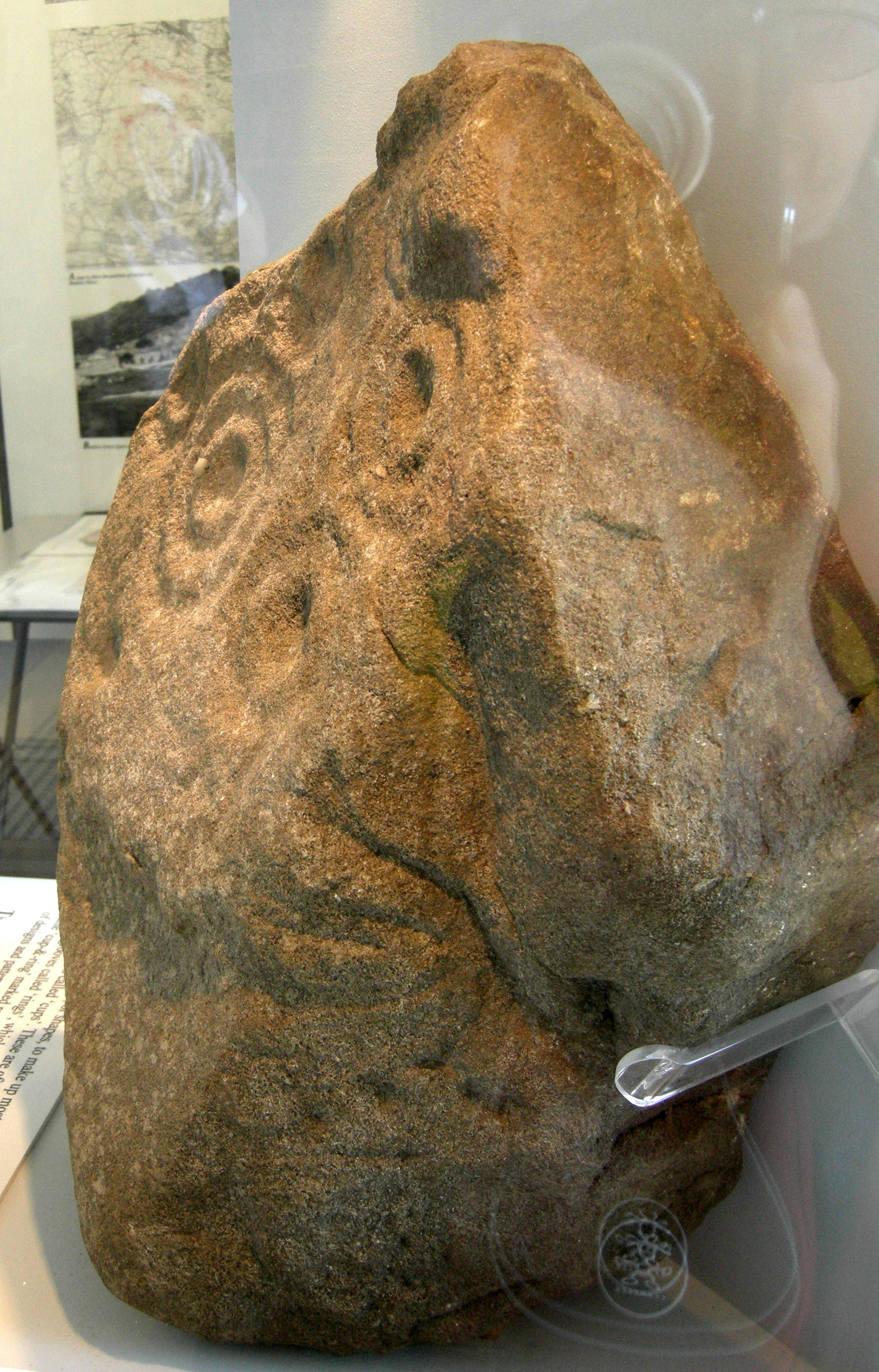
The Heygate stone with cup and ring marks.

This room contains displays of archaeological, geological and local history exhibits which are aimed at both adults and children. The museum's prime exhibit, the Heygate stone, is central. The walls have information boards, and there are various other exhibits here.

==== Heygate stone ====
This is one of the nationally important Rombalds Moor cup and ring rocks. They were engraved in the Neolithic era, and the larger engraved rocks have been left on the moor as it is thought that their meaning may be associated with the landscape. This more portable rock is in the museum for safety: the plough-marks on the rock indicate one of the reasons for this. The Heygate stone is one of the clearest examples of this type of petroglyph. A cast of the engraving reveals that the two larger ring-marks are superimposed on the others. The stone was found in Near Hey Gate Field near Baildon by a local landowner on 25 September 2001, and it is believed that it was originally a rock with a larger area of 5000-year-old petroglyphs that had been quarried nearby in recent history, then dressed on two sides for wall-building. It is at the landowner's wish that the stone is preserved at the museum, as near as possible to its original site, because it cannot now be returned to the position where it lay in the Neolithic era.

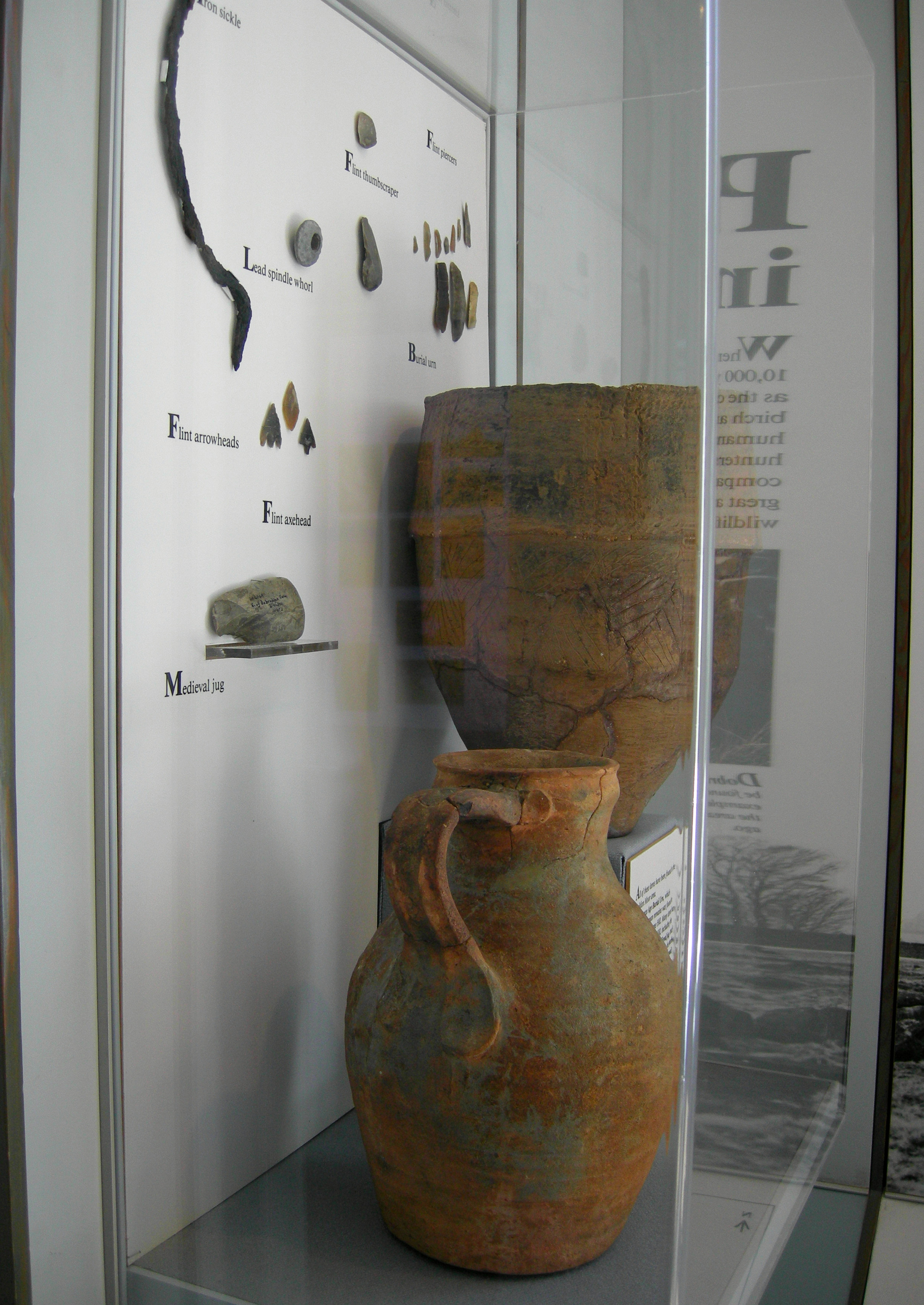
Prehistoric and medieval artefacts display.

==== Local finds ====
This glass case contains Neolithic and medieval items found in the Baildon Moor area. There is an iron sickle, and a Neolithic burial urn found in 1904 on Pennithorne Hill. There is a medieval jug and a lead spindle whorl found on Hope Hill. From the same place are some Neolithic arrow heads, thumbscrapers and piercers - all made of knapped flint. There are also Roman coins, one of which was found in Shipley Glen, across the road.

==== Quern-stone ====
Within reach of children, there is an Iron Age beehive quern-stone with removable wooden handle and plenty of grain for grinding. Visitors are invited to look at a drawing of the inner structure of the object, and to try to work out how to grind the corn. When turning the headstone, you can feel how the grain lessens the friction enough for the headstone to turn easily, while the roughness of the stone continues to provide enough friction to grind the corn: a paradox perhaps, but it works. However, to allow entry of grain, the central wooden spindle of a quern-stone is by necessity very loosely fitted through the hole in the headstone, which means that the headstone can move sideways, and young children's fingers must be supervised.

==== Local fossils ====
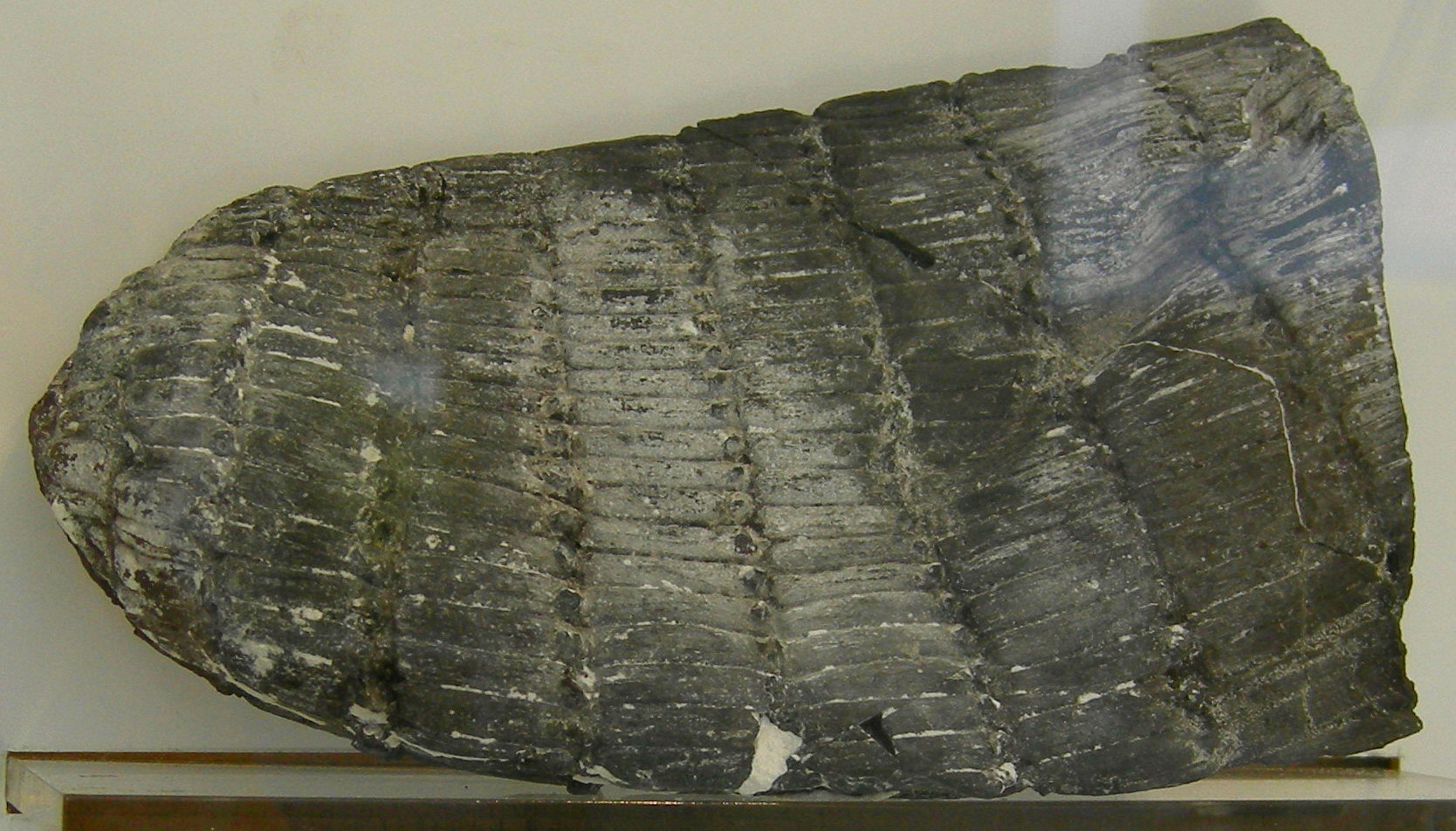
Calamites fossil (huge type of horsetail).

There is a display of locally-found fossils including the big Calamites, a horsetail-type, and the little Gastrioceras, a kind of ammonite. There are also fossils of Lepidodendron, Stigmaria, Carbonicola, Dunbarella and Lingula: all found in the Baildon Moor area.

==== Local geology ====
There is an information board about local sedimentary rock, with a display of small, loose stones for children to handle. These include ironstone, iron slag, gritstone, coal, sandstone and shale. The information board has a cross-section of Baildon Moor, showing the layers of different sedimentary rock and faults. Children who later walk or picnic on the moor across the road will see the large rocks, weathered to show faults and sedimentary layers.

==== Local oral history ====
This is heard via the headphones display. Oral history is vital to preserve a sense of community and identity in the locality.

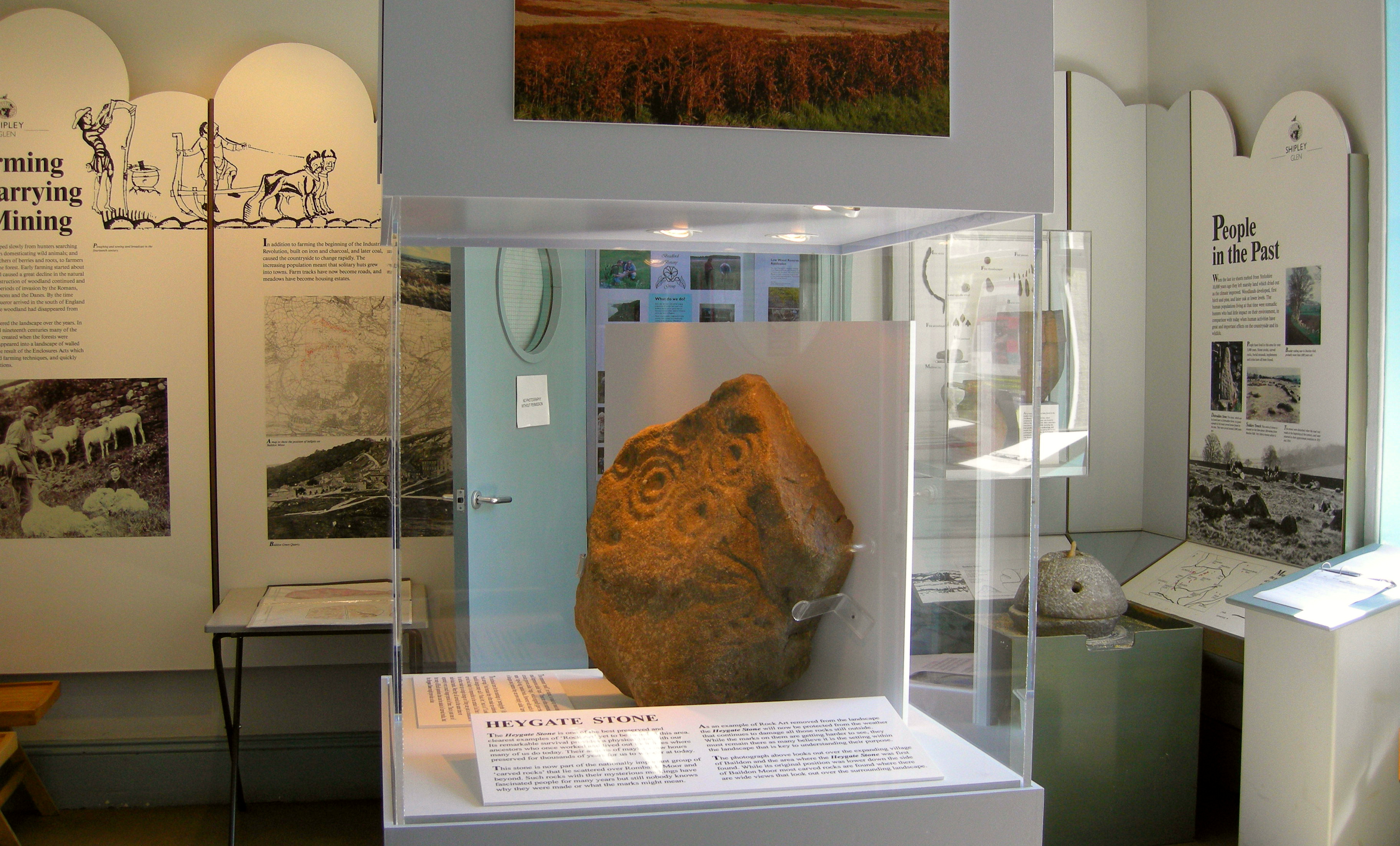
Archaeology and local history displays.

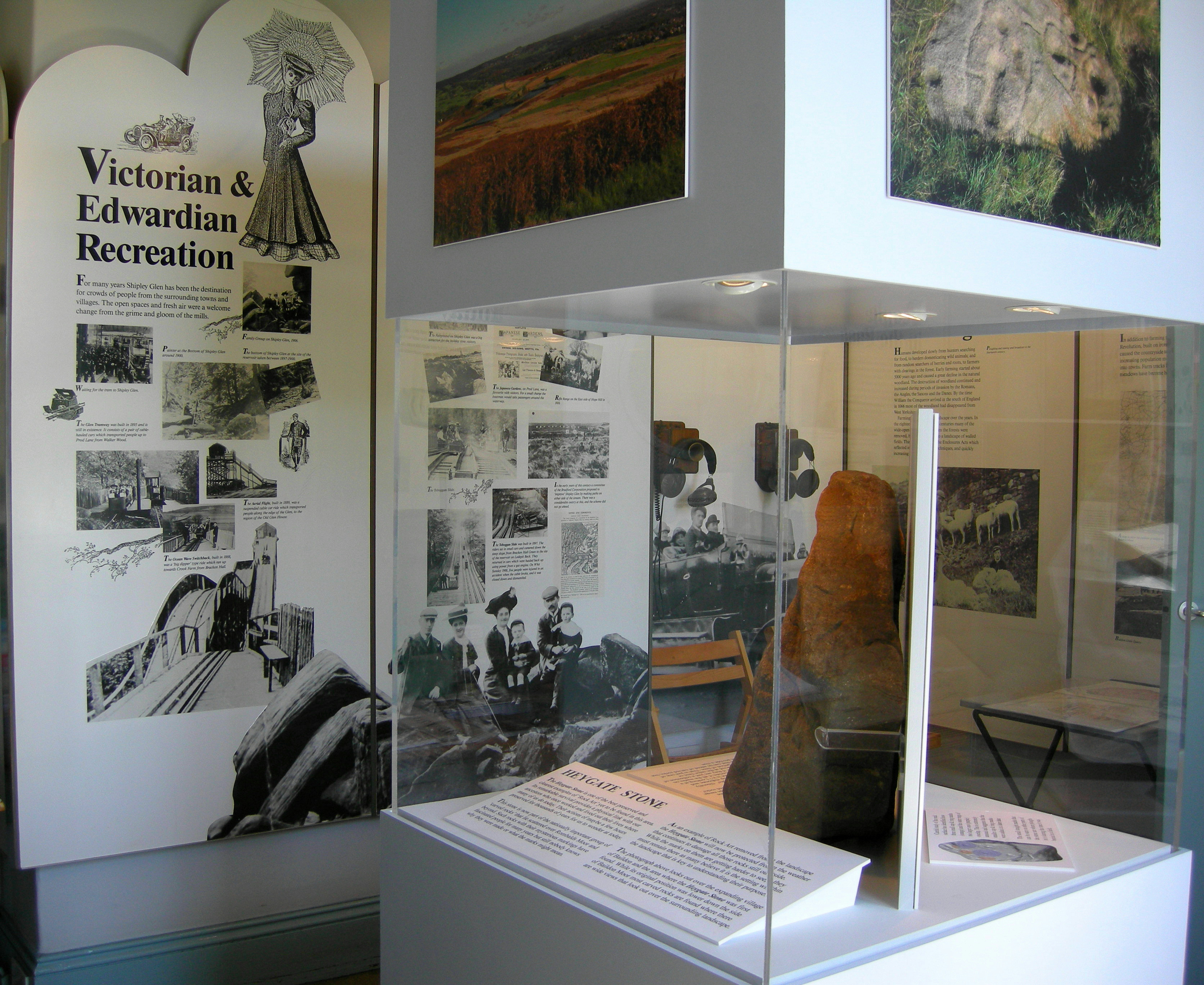
Archaeology and local history displays.

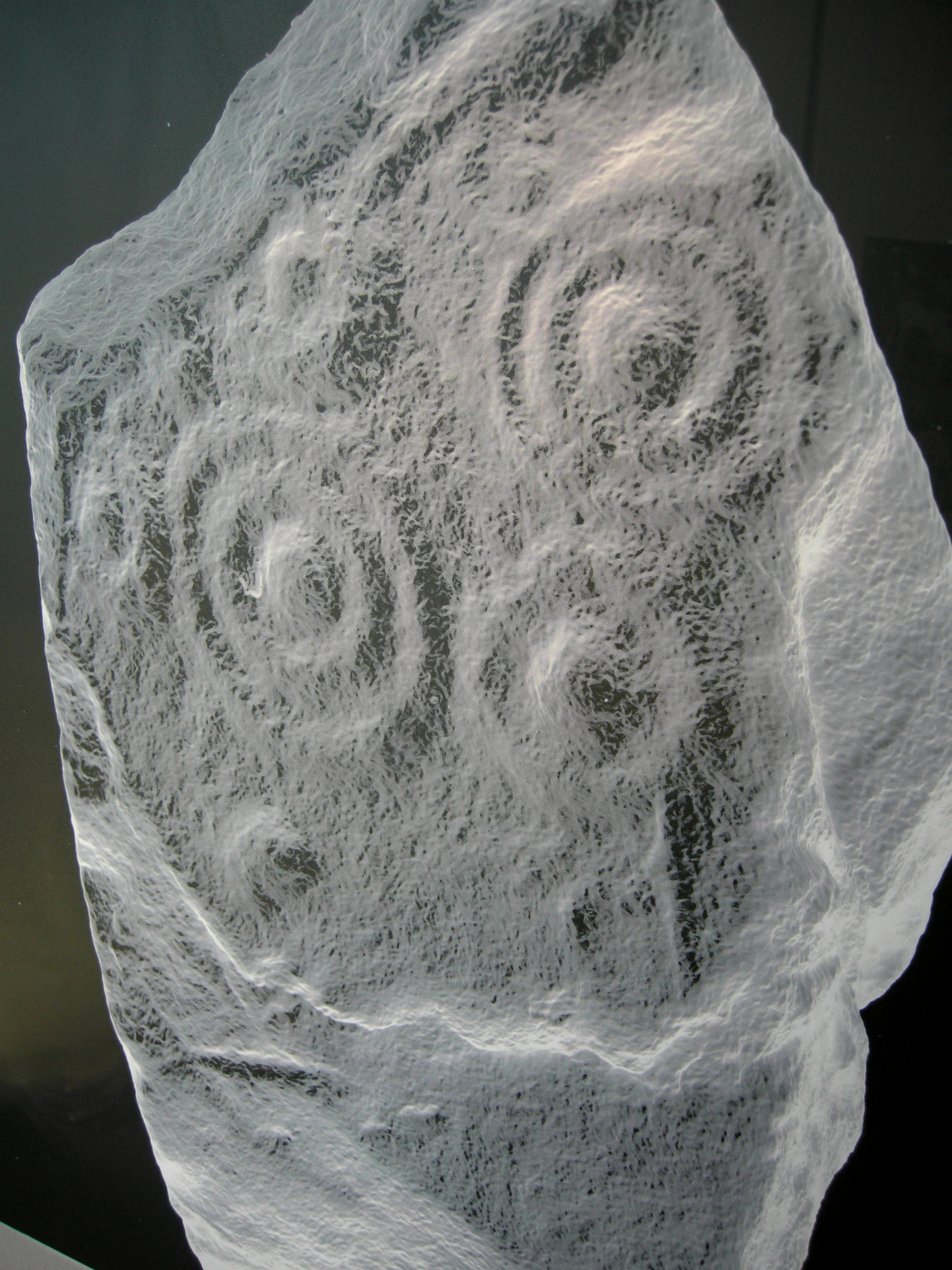
Cast of Heygate stone, showing cup and ring overlaps.

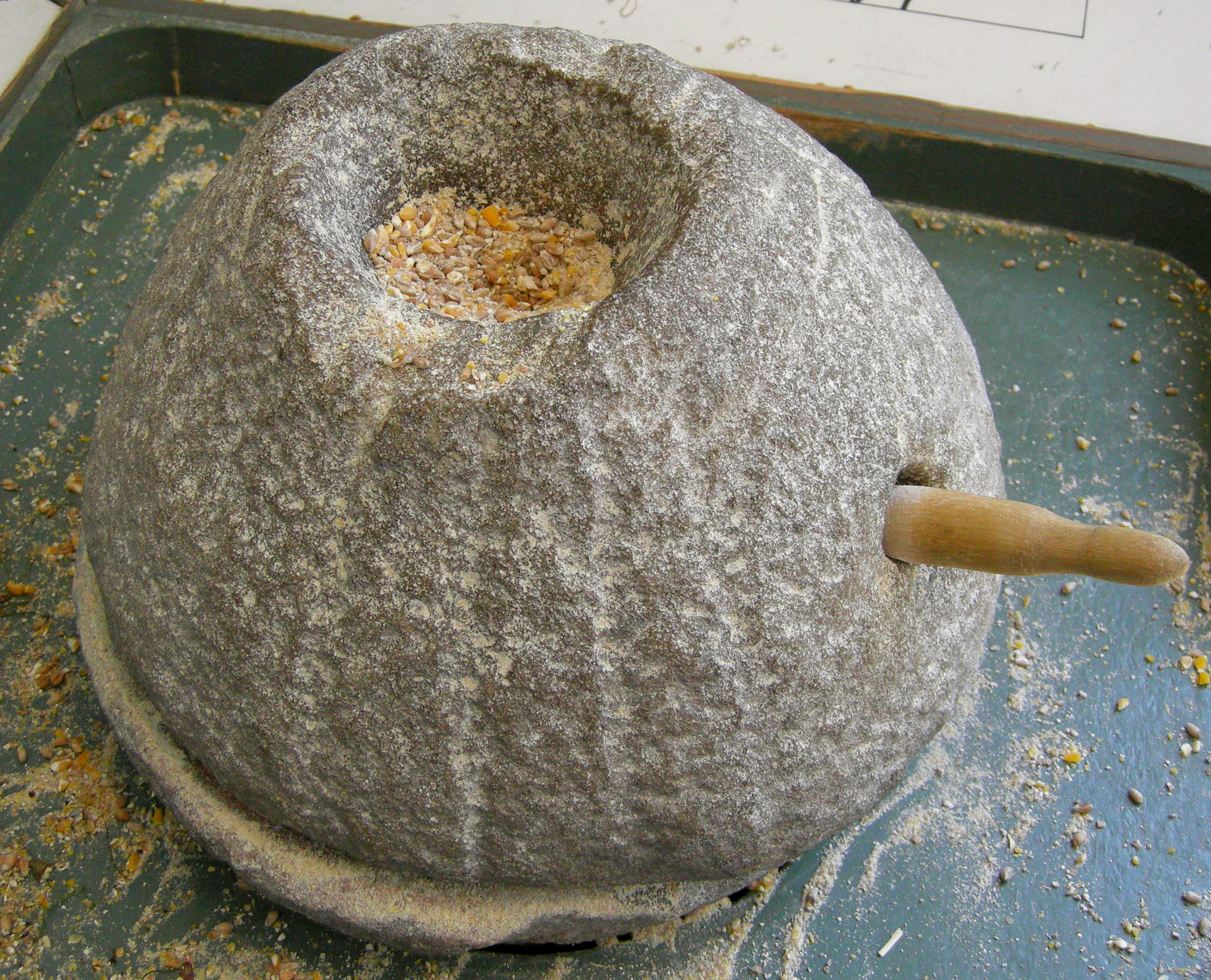
Interactive quern-stone display.

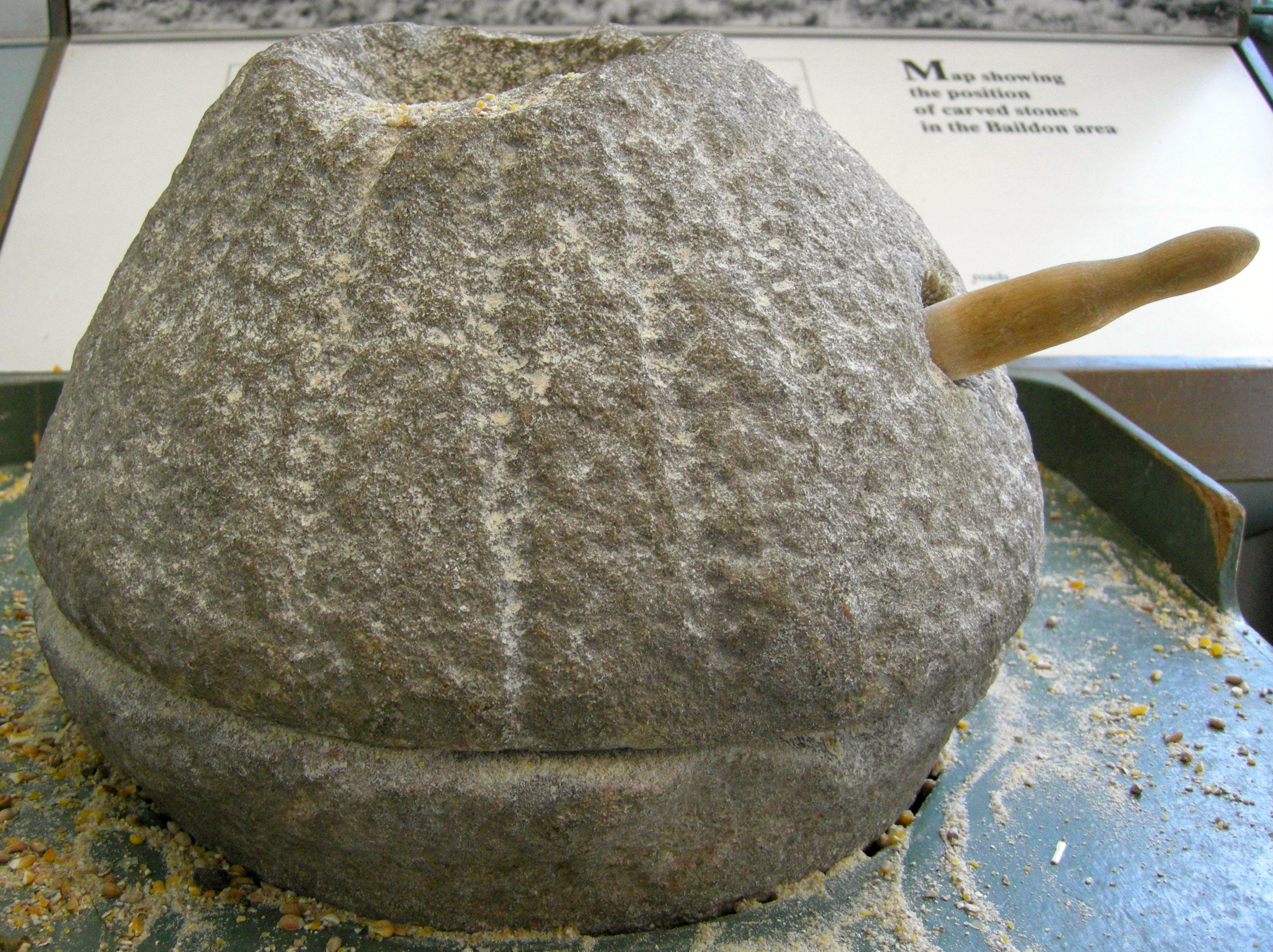
Interactive quern-stone display.

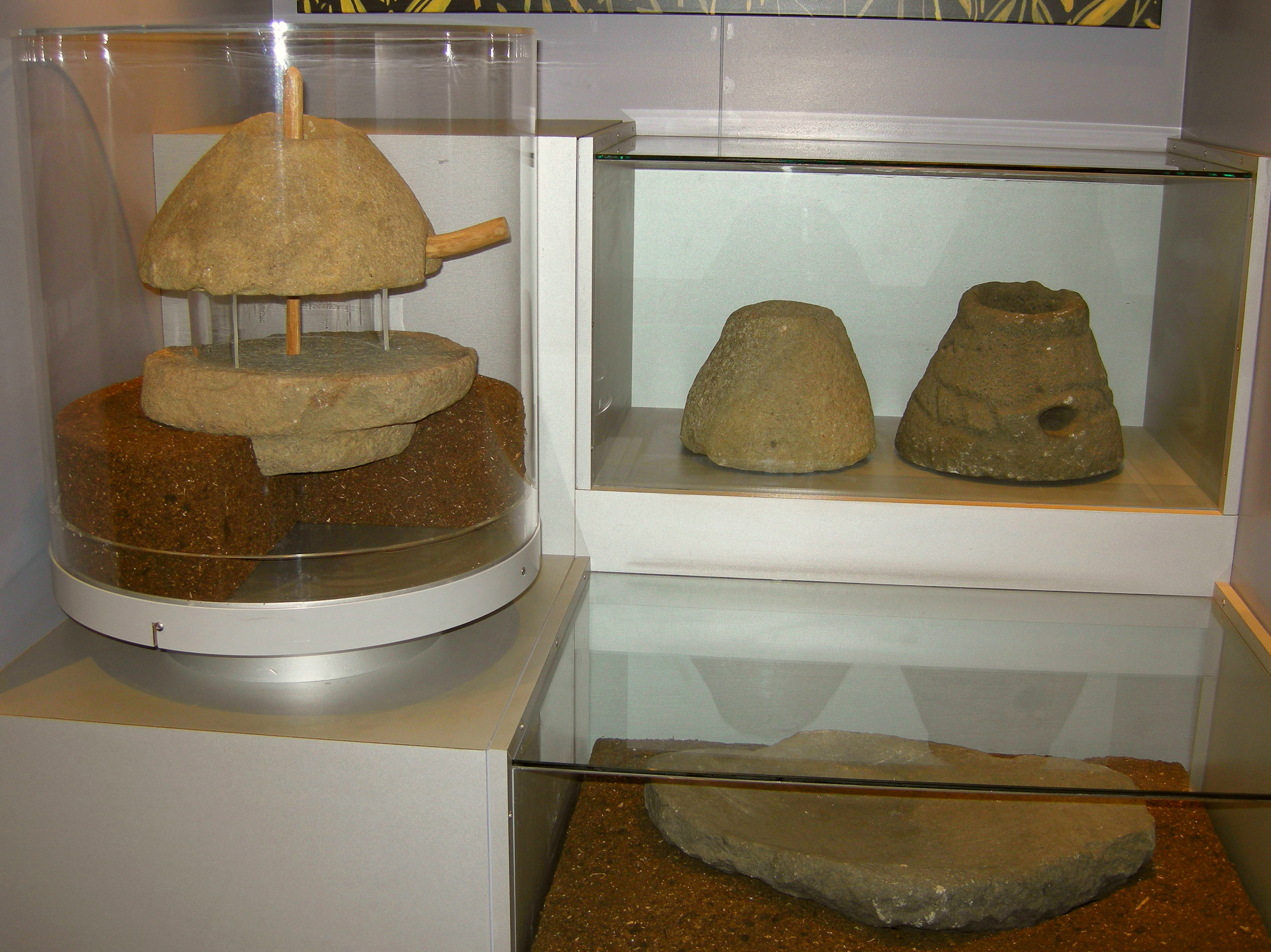
Quern-stones at Cliffe Castle Museum, showing central wooden spindle.

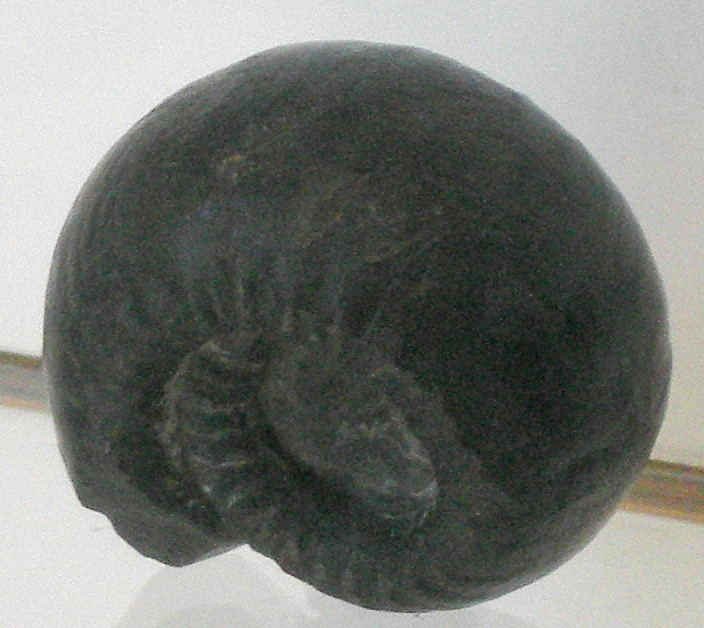
Gastrioceras fossil (ammonoid: coiled-shell swimming animal).

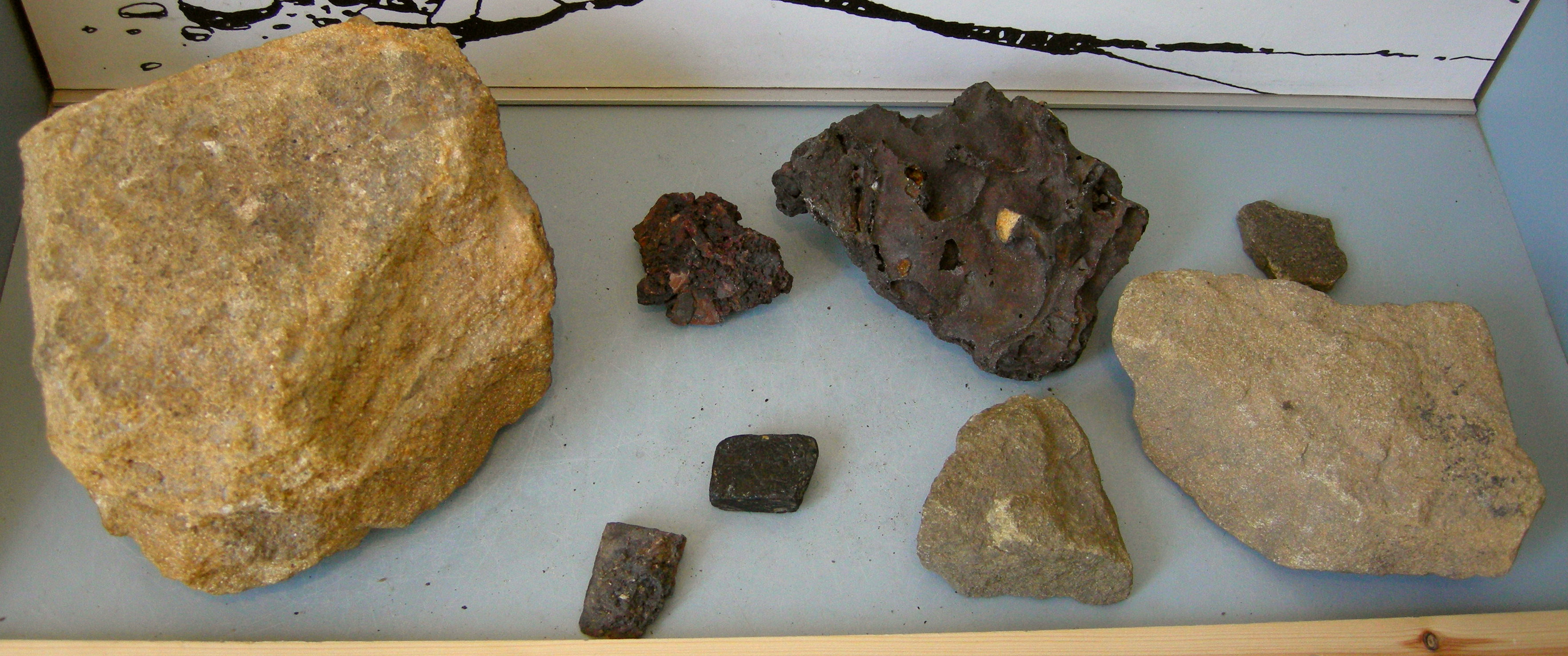
Geological samples, for visitors to handle.

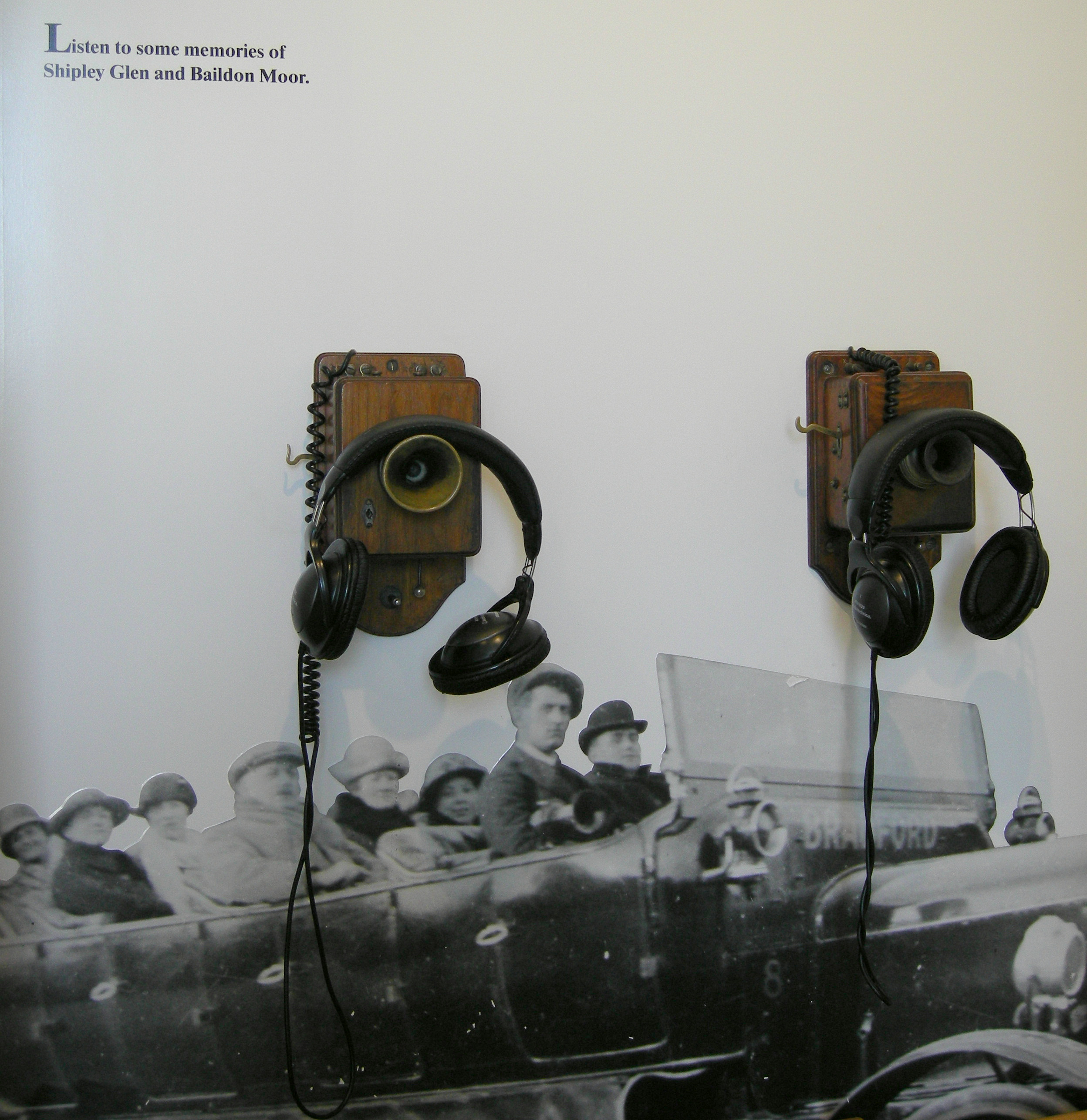
Headphones with recordings of Shipley Glen and Baildon Moor local history.

=== Front door lobby ===
In the lobby or original entrance hall you can see the inside of the heavy, panelled, original front door. There is a sheaf of wildlife-identification quiz-sheets, and a board of numbered pictures to identify. The pictures include some unusual specimens, so the quiz is pitched at both adult and child level.

There are various displays and wildlife pictures here, which are regularly rotated according to requirement.

=== Exhibition and activity room ===
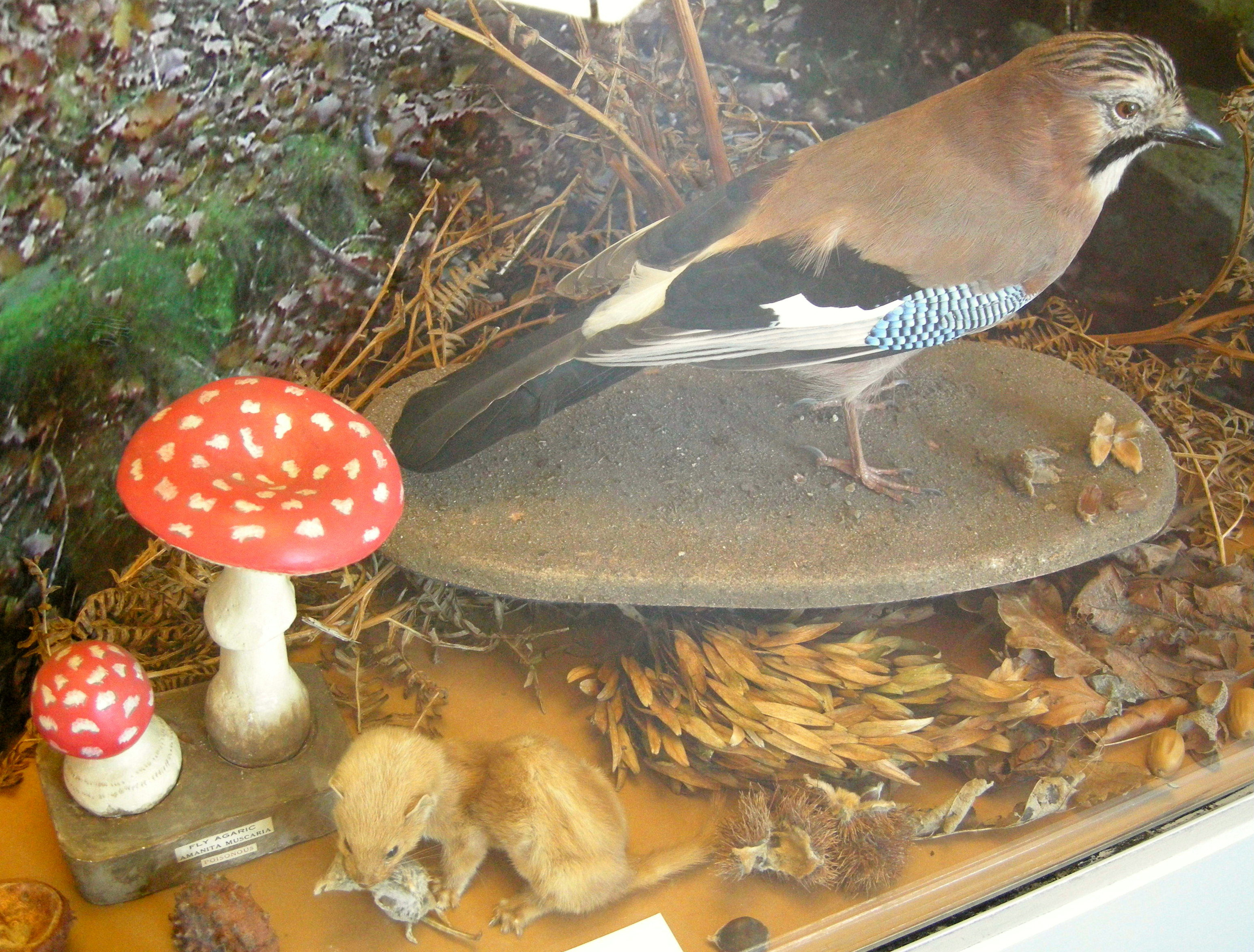
Nature tableau, including mounted weasel with shrew, mounted jay and model of fly agaric.

This would have been the right-hand reception room of the original Bracken Hall farmhouse. It is used as a gallery. The table contains reference books which may assist with part of the wildlife identification quiz. The room is also used for educational group visits.

==== Display of past and present nature study ====
This corner display, behind safety-glass, contains evidence which children can use to compare old and new methods of studying botany. For example, they can see the more academic approach of previous centuries, including the obsession with classification and dusty books, together with hand-coloured drawings and a brass optical microscope. They can compare what was once known as botanizing with the modern muddy-boots-and-fieldwork approach, expensive cameras and cheap field-guides.

==== Autumnal nature tableau ====
Here is another example of the taxidermist's art. There are autumn seeds to identify in this display, and an opportunity for a close-up view of some of the UK's more shy animals: the weasel, shrew and jay.

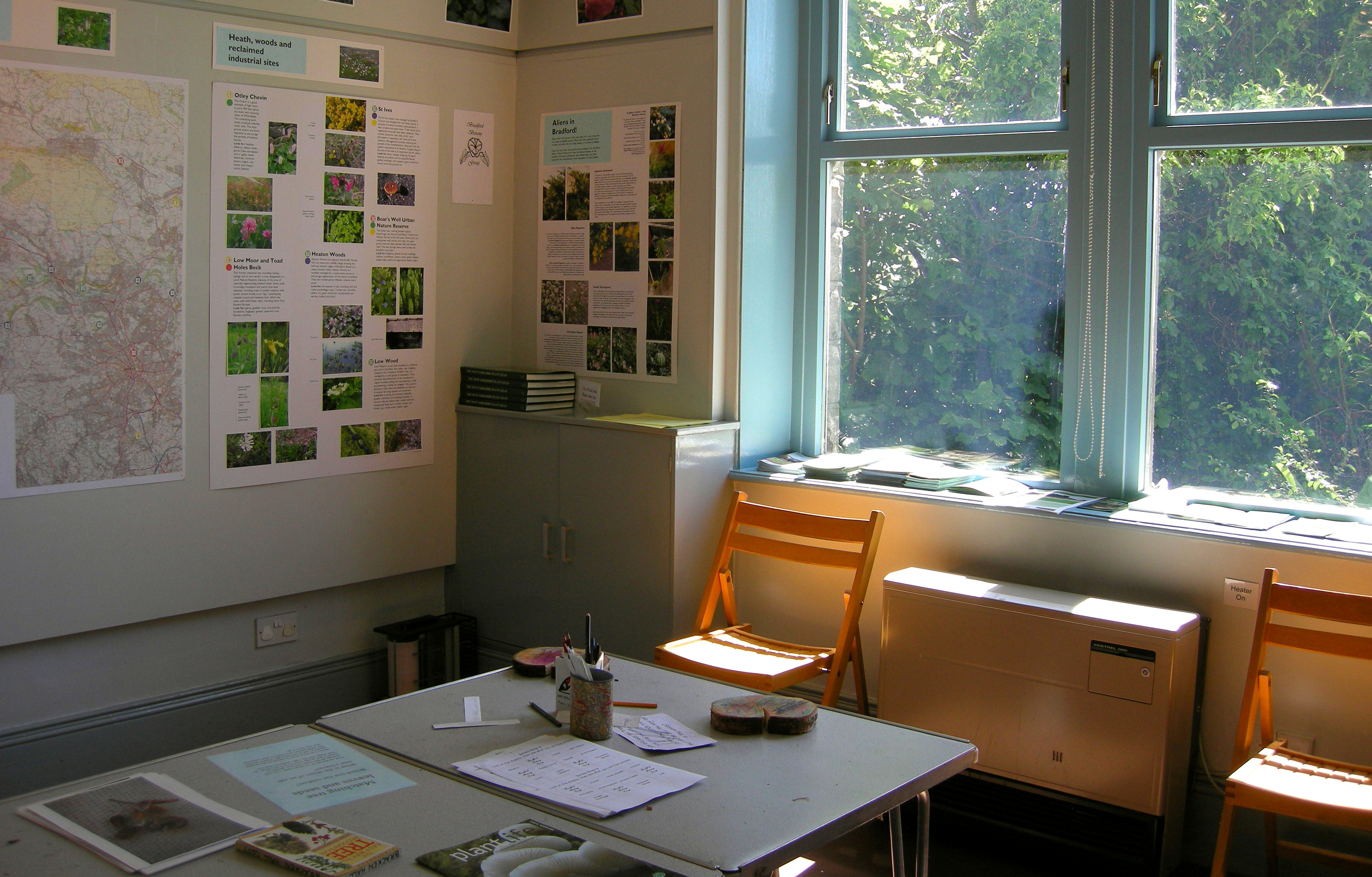
Exhibition and activity room.

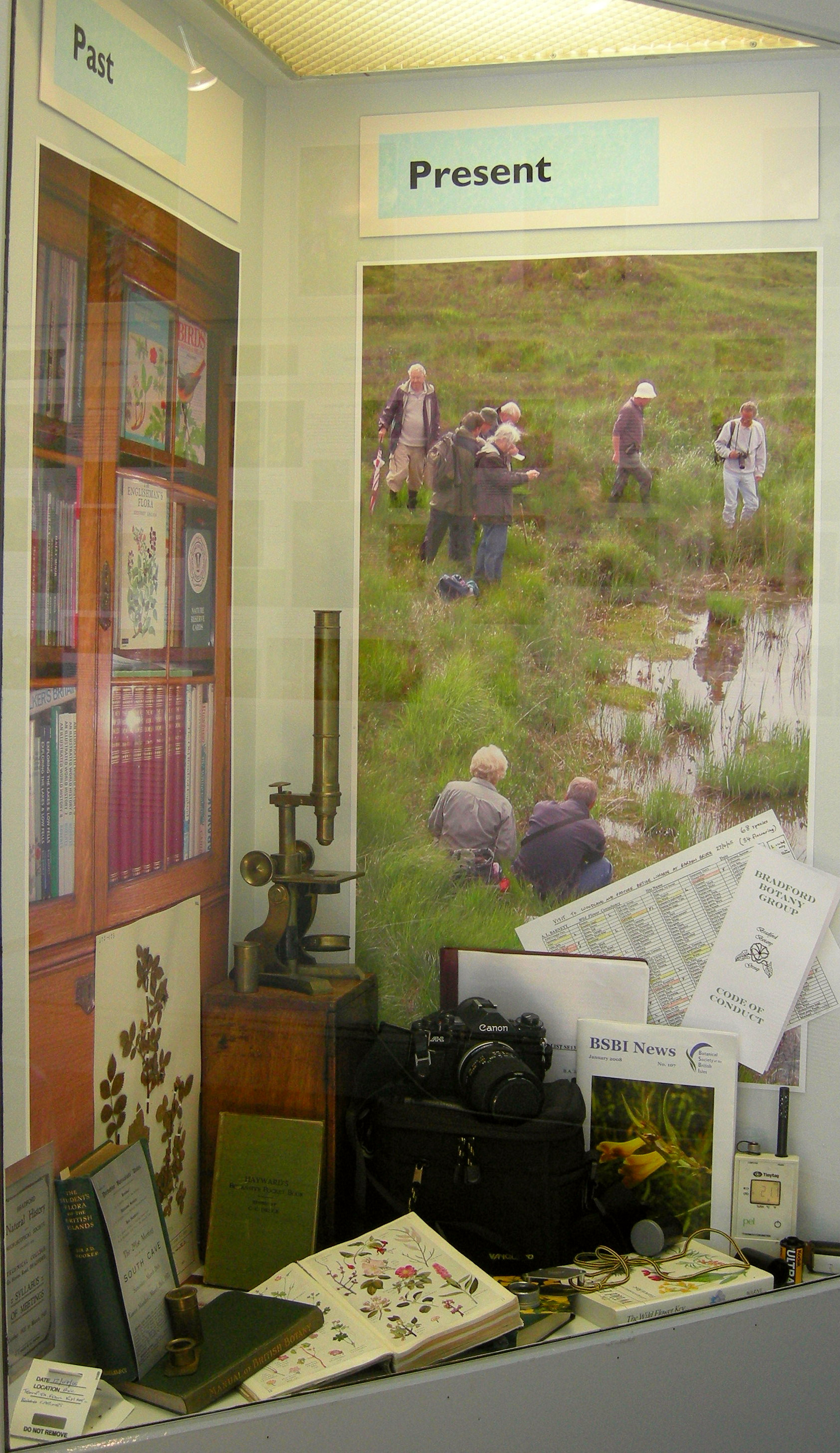
Display of past and present botanizing.

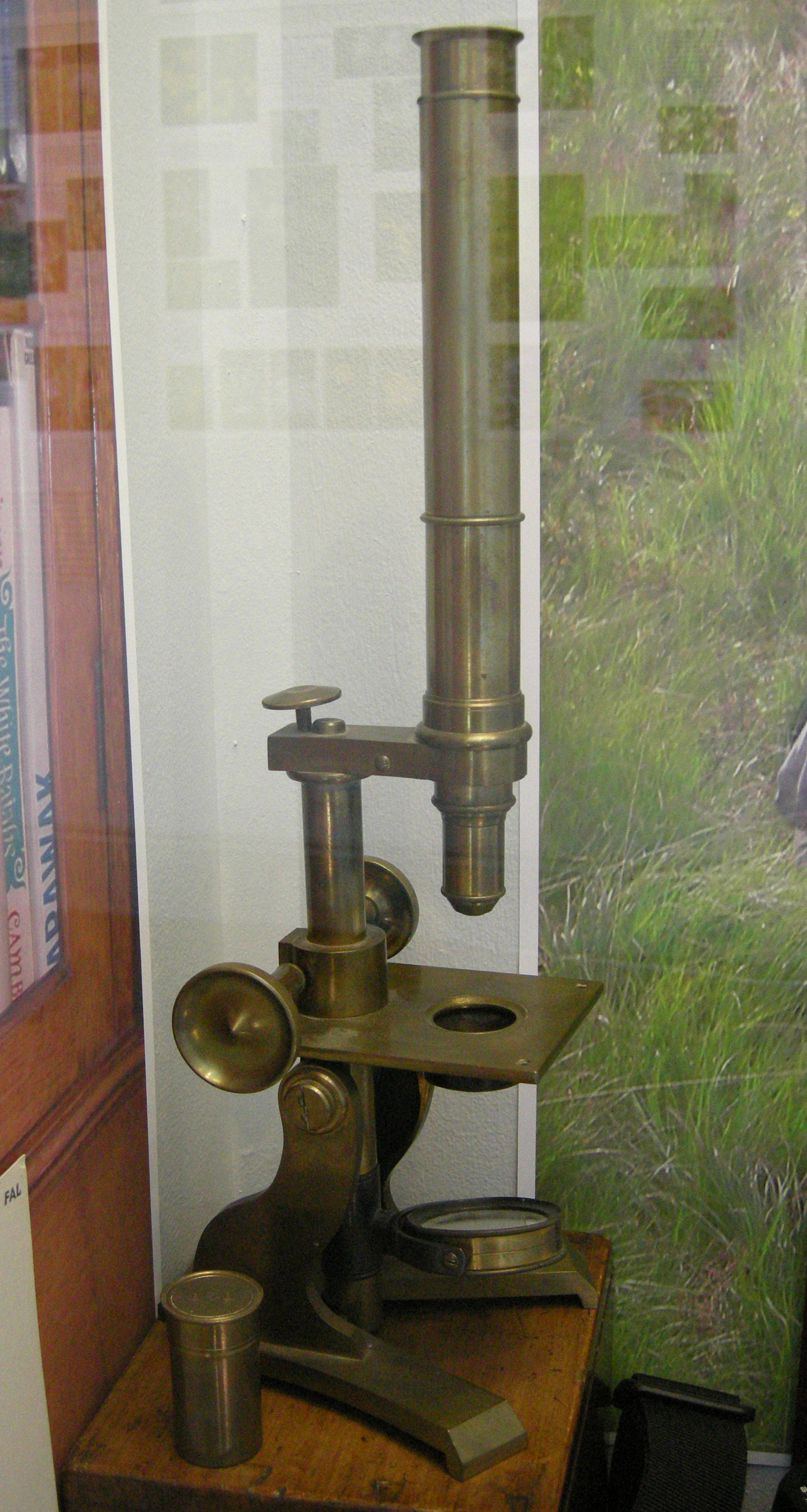
19th-century brass optical microscope

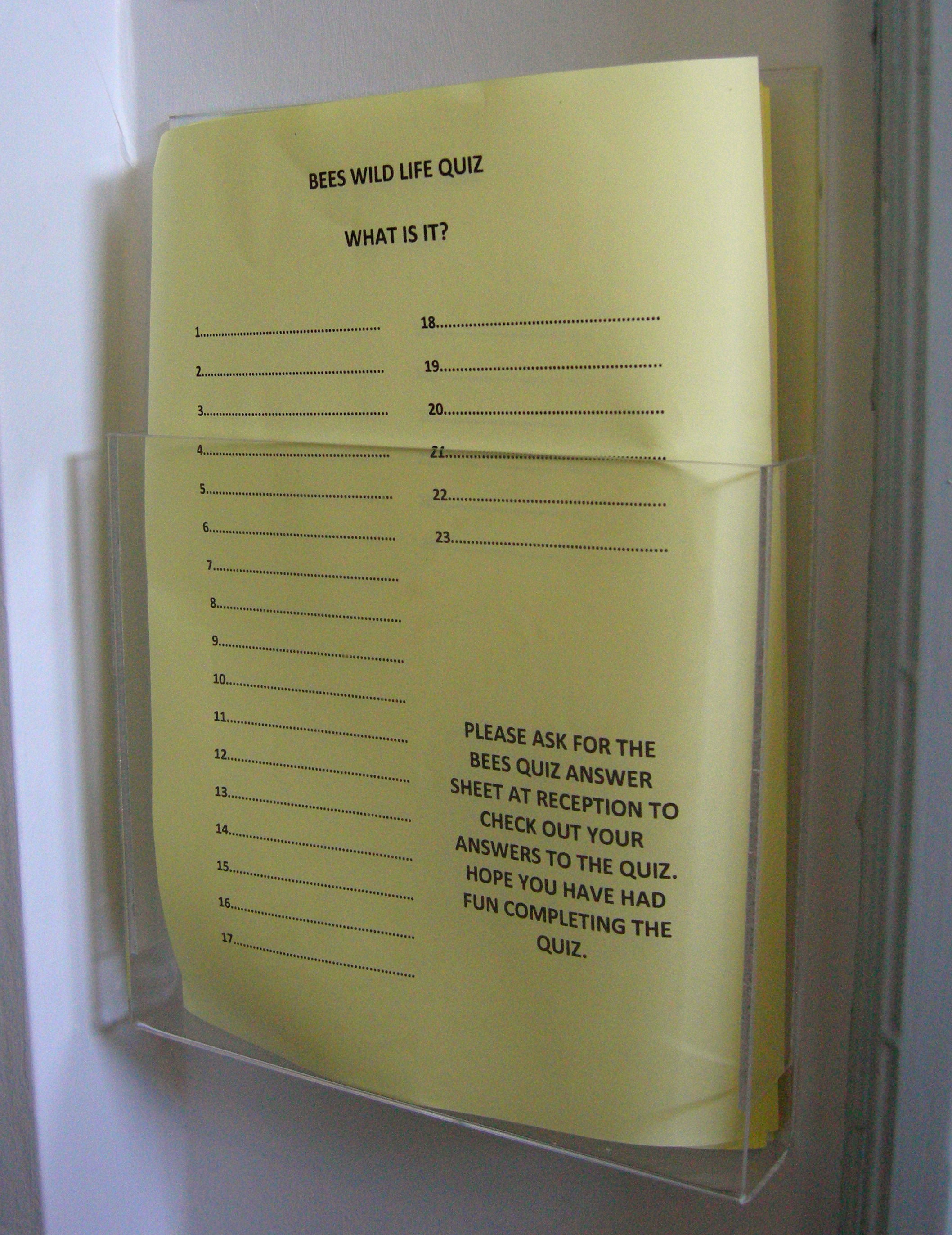
Quiz forms in lobby

=== Back garden ===
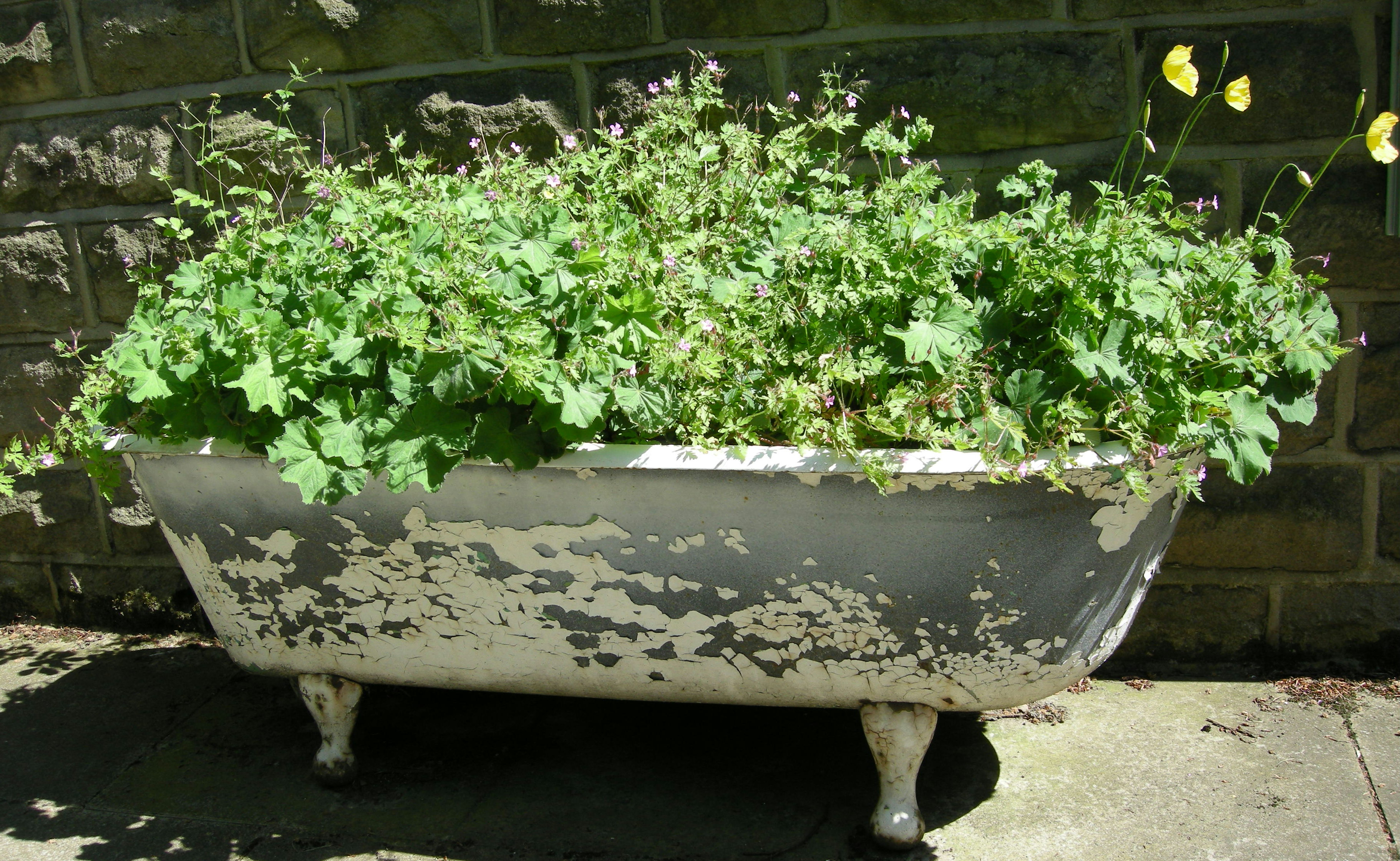
Herb Robert and Welsh poppy growing in a bath

==== Back yard ====
This is accessed via the back door of the Entrance room, or by walking left across the front lawn. In the back yard are the toilets, and an animal hutch.

==== Side garden ====
In the side garden there is a raised lawn, with a minibeast trapdoor laid on the bare earth. This allows small invertebrates to shelter under it, and children can expose them by lifting the trapdoor. The trapdoor is light enough for a five-year-old to lift easily. Slugs, snails, earthworms, woodlouse and millipedes are likely inhabitants here. On the lawn is another animal hutch, a safety cage for beehives - disused due to colony collapse disorder - and a shed with batboxes fixed to the side. There are two old bramley apple trees, and a facsimile cup and ring stone for the children to handle.

==== Side path ====
Here is an old bathtub full of wild flowers growing, and a safety cage for the now-disused entrance to the indoor beehive. Bumble bees still constantly try to use the entrance in early summer. Wellington boots dry on the bench: it can be muddy here for most of the year.

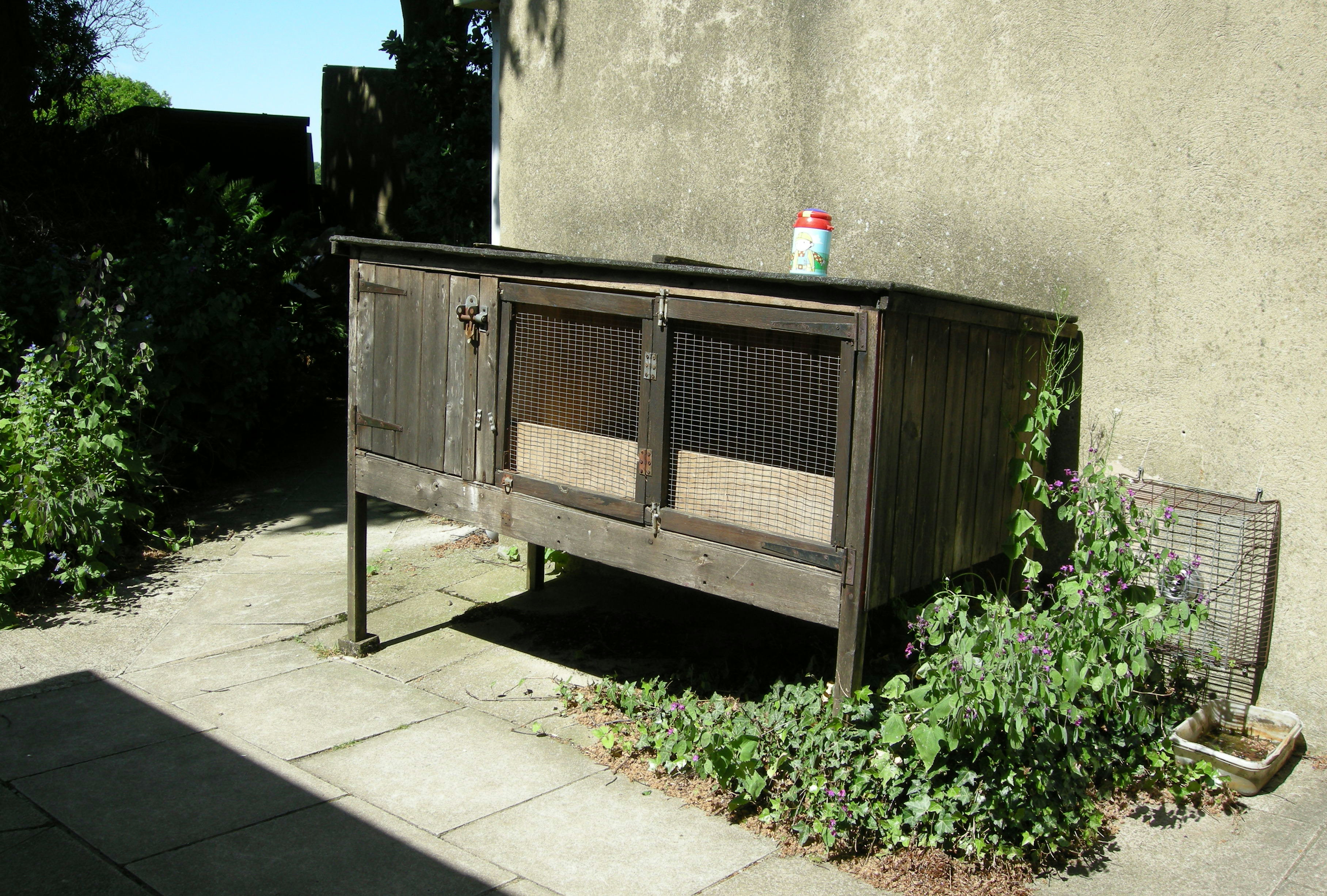
Animal hutch in back yard.

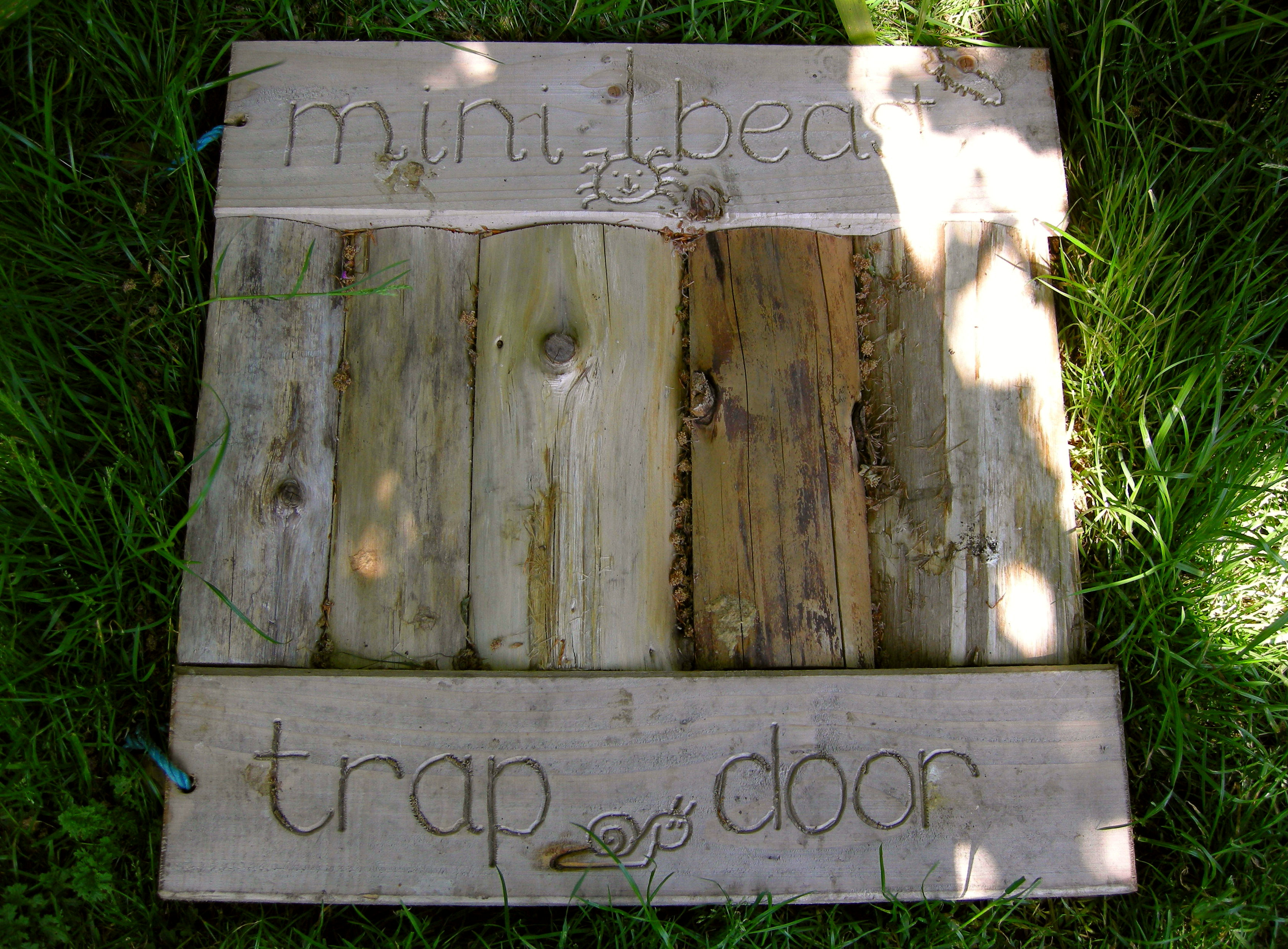
Minibeast trapdoor, for children to observe slug, woodlouse, millipede, snail etc.

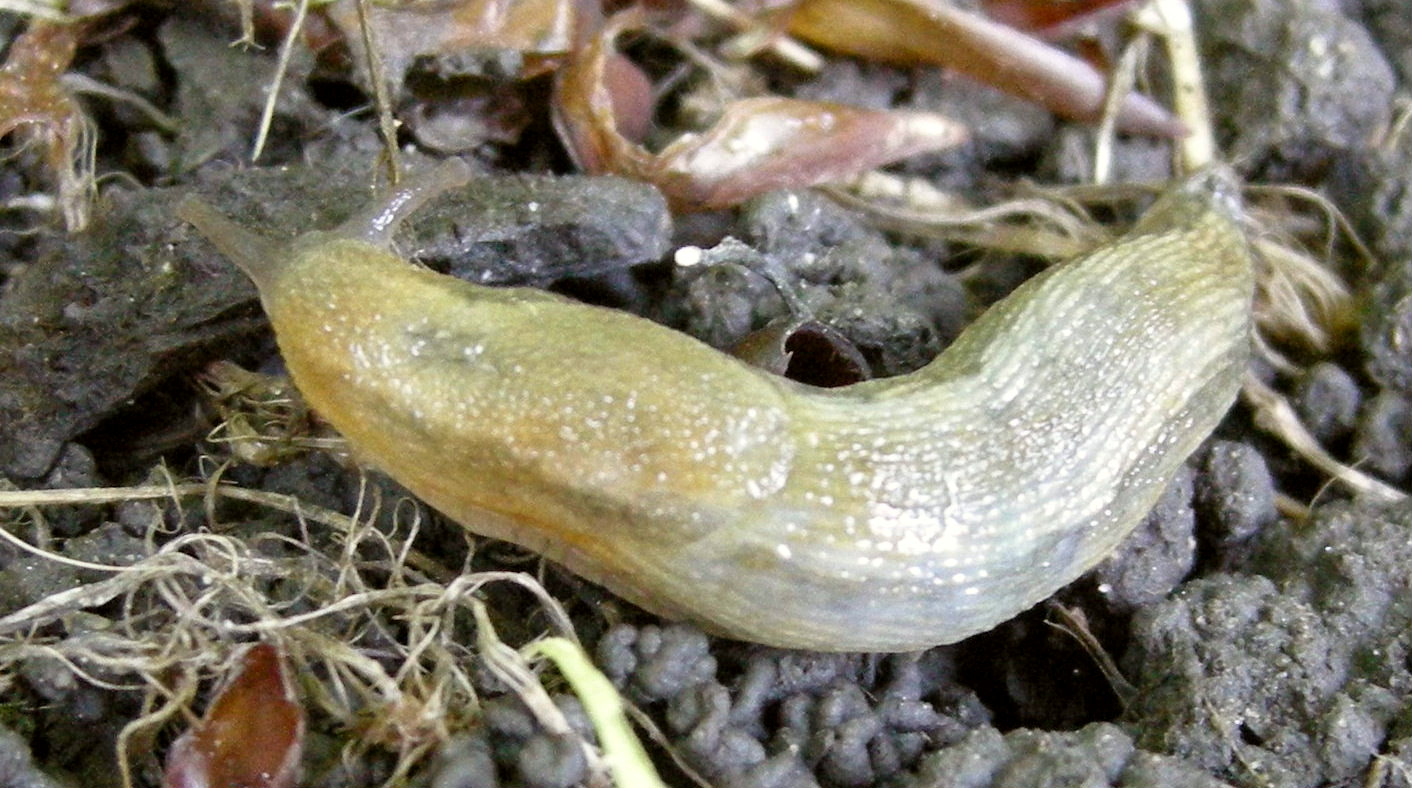
Slug under minibeast trapdoor, Arion fasciatus.

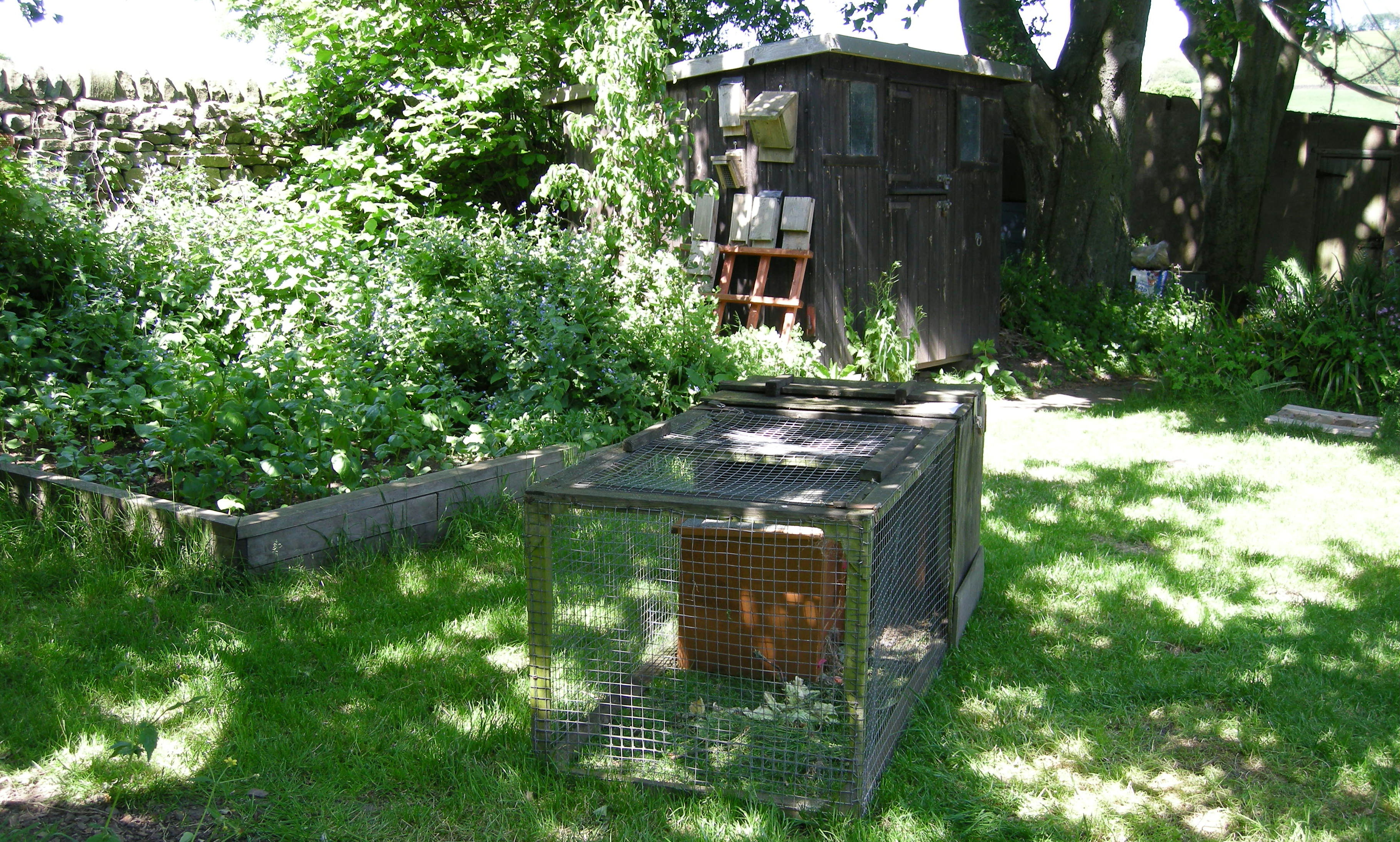
Backyard view of hutch and shed with bat-boxes.

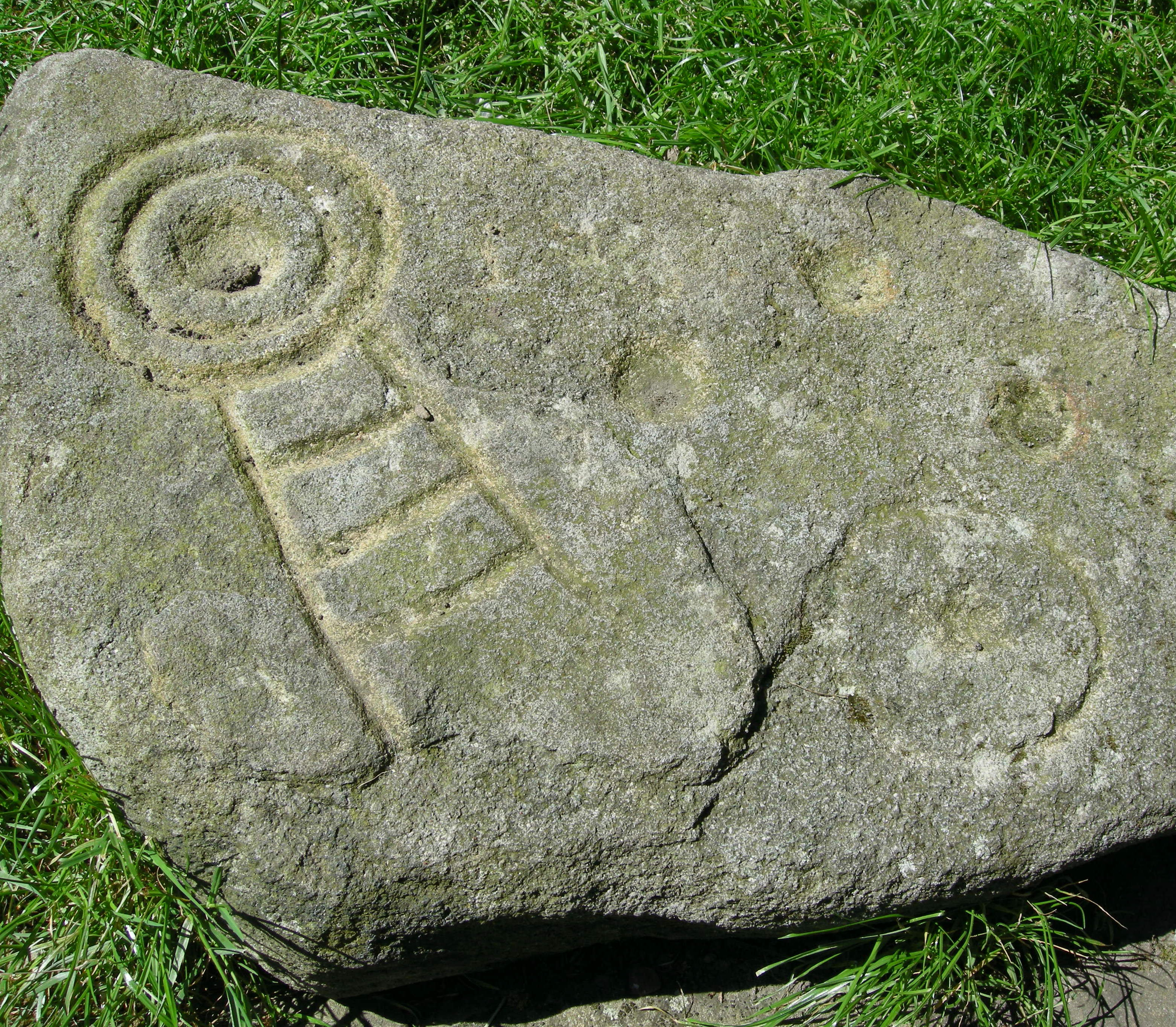
cup and ring marks created by archaeologists with a deer antler pick

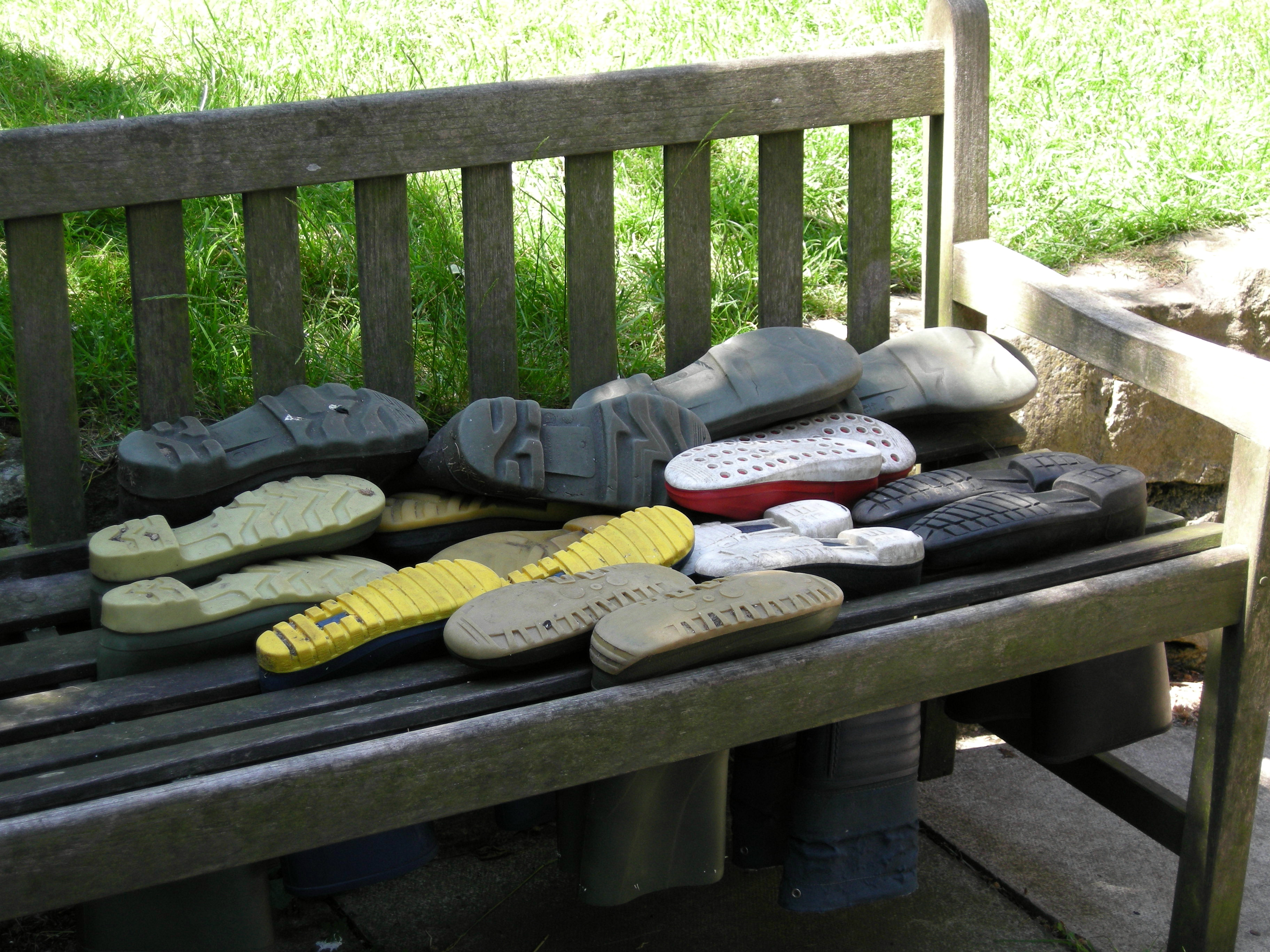
Wellington boots drying on a bench

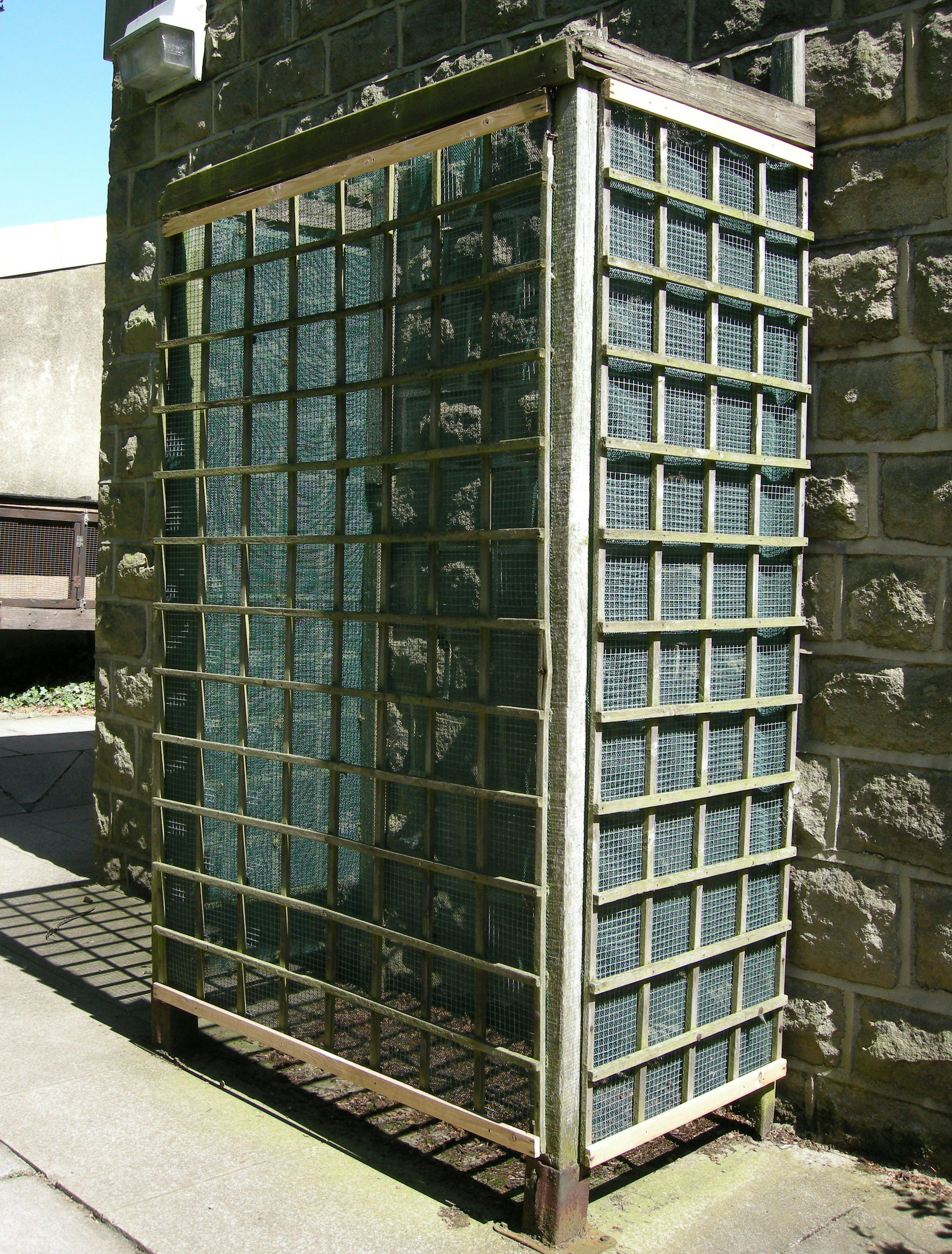
Safety cage around entrance to indoor hive (now dismantled)

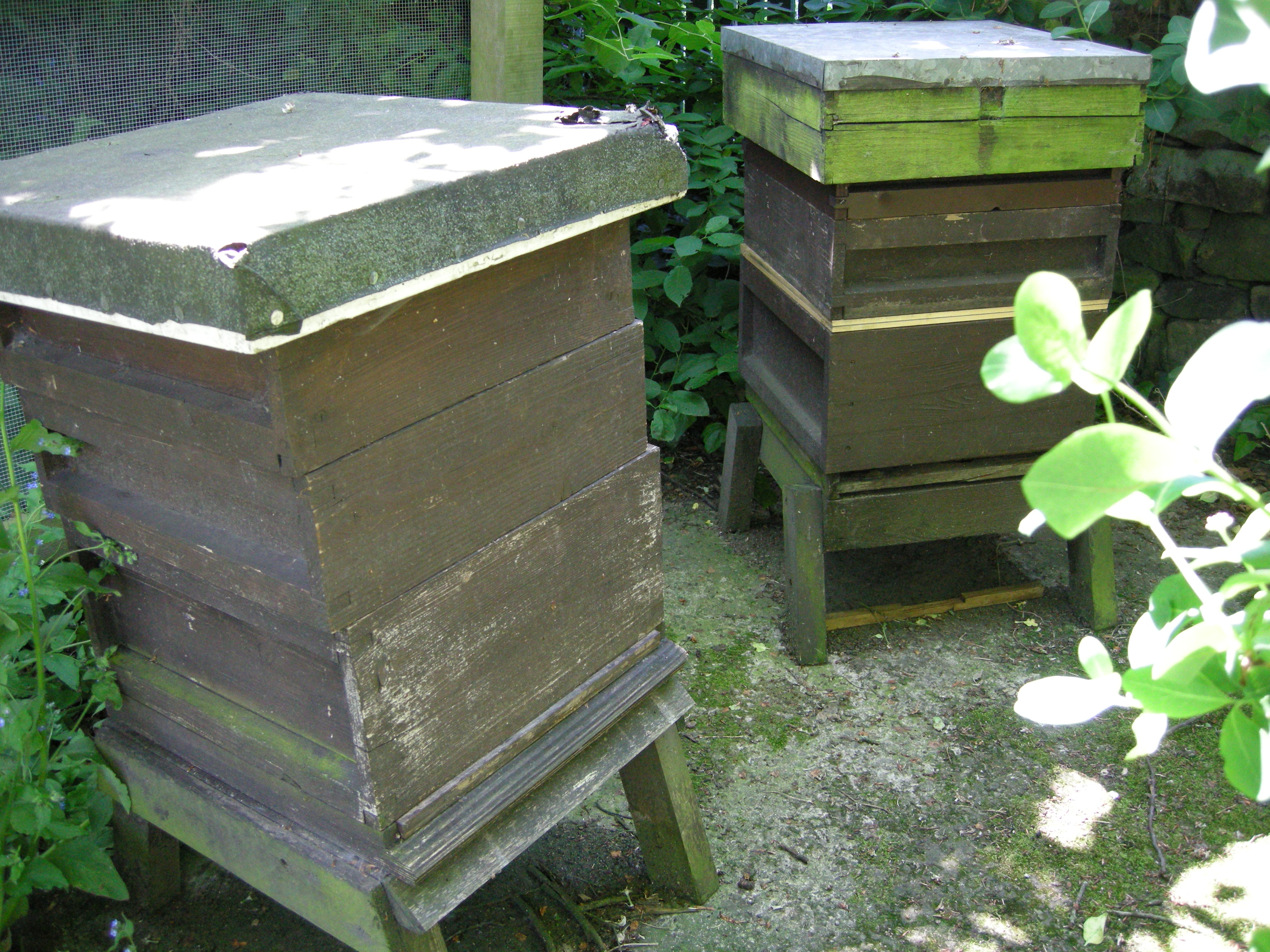
Disused beehives

=== Pond area ===
The children's dipping pond is accessed from the side lawn or from the front lawn. It contains yellow flags, tadpoles, frogs, newts, efts and other pondlife.

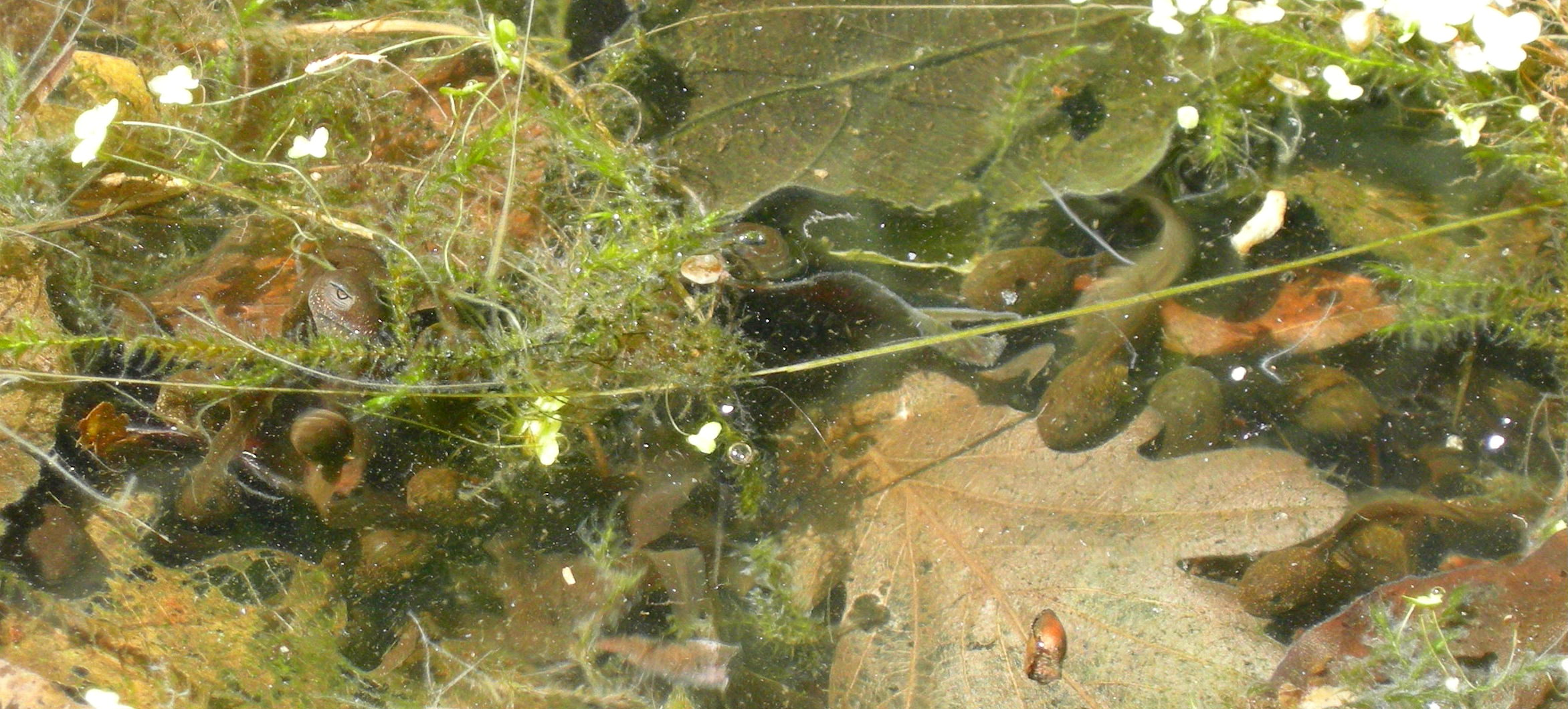
Bracken Hall dipping pond, image (1). Tadpoles, and head of smooth newt or eft centre left.

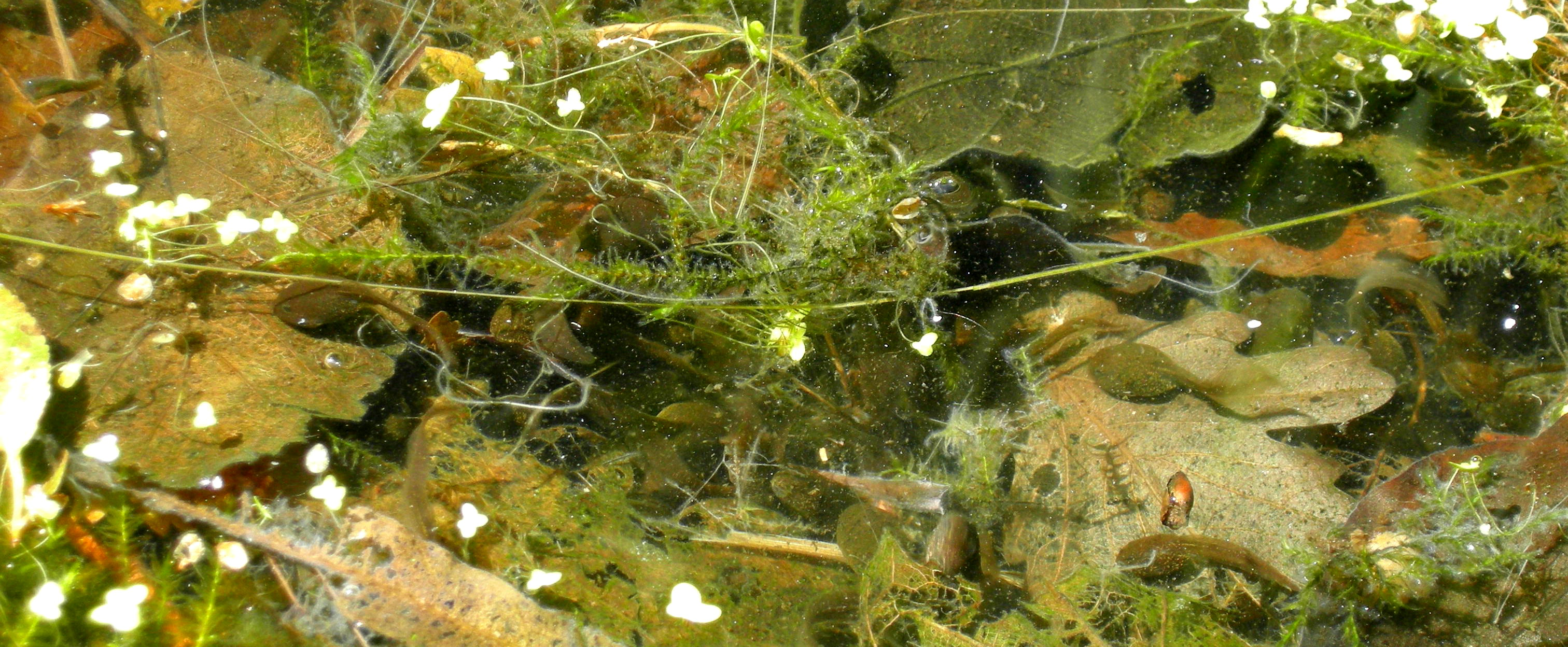
Bracken Hall dipping pond, image (2). This photo was taken seconds after image (1). The newt has moved slightly lower, under the vegetation. View at max resolution to see the hidden newt's head.

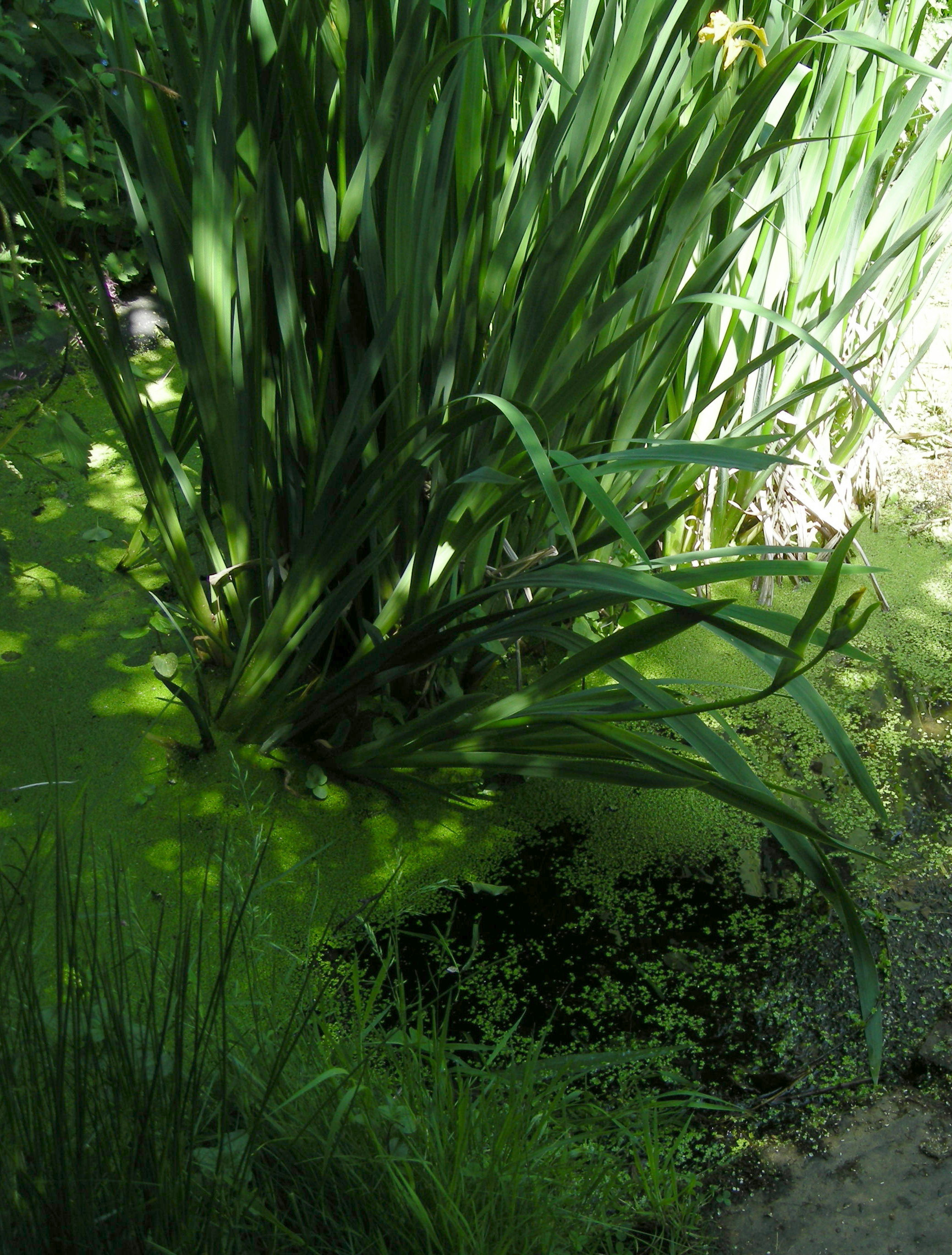
Wildlife pond for children, with flag leaves.

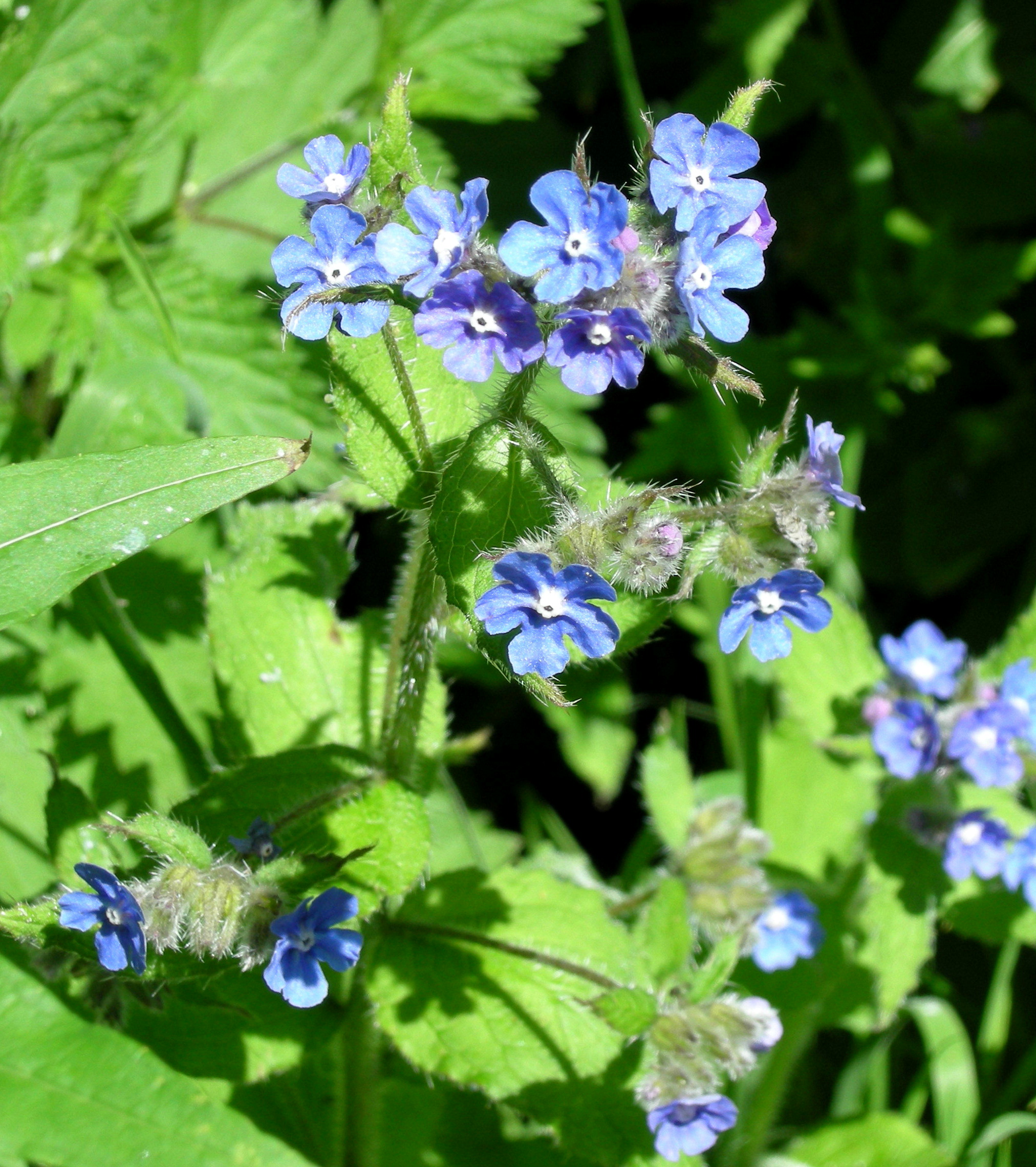
Green alkanet (pentaglottis sempervirens)

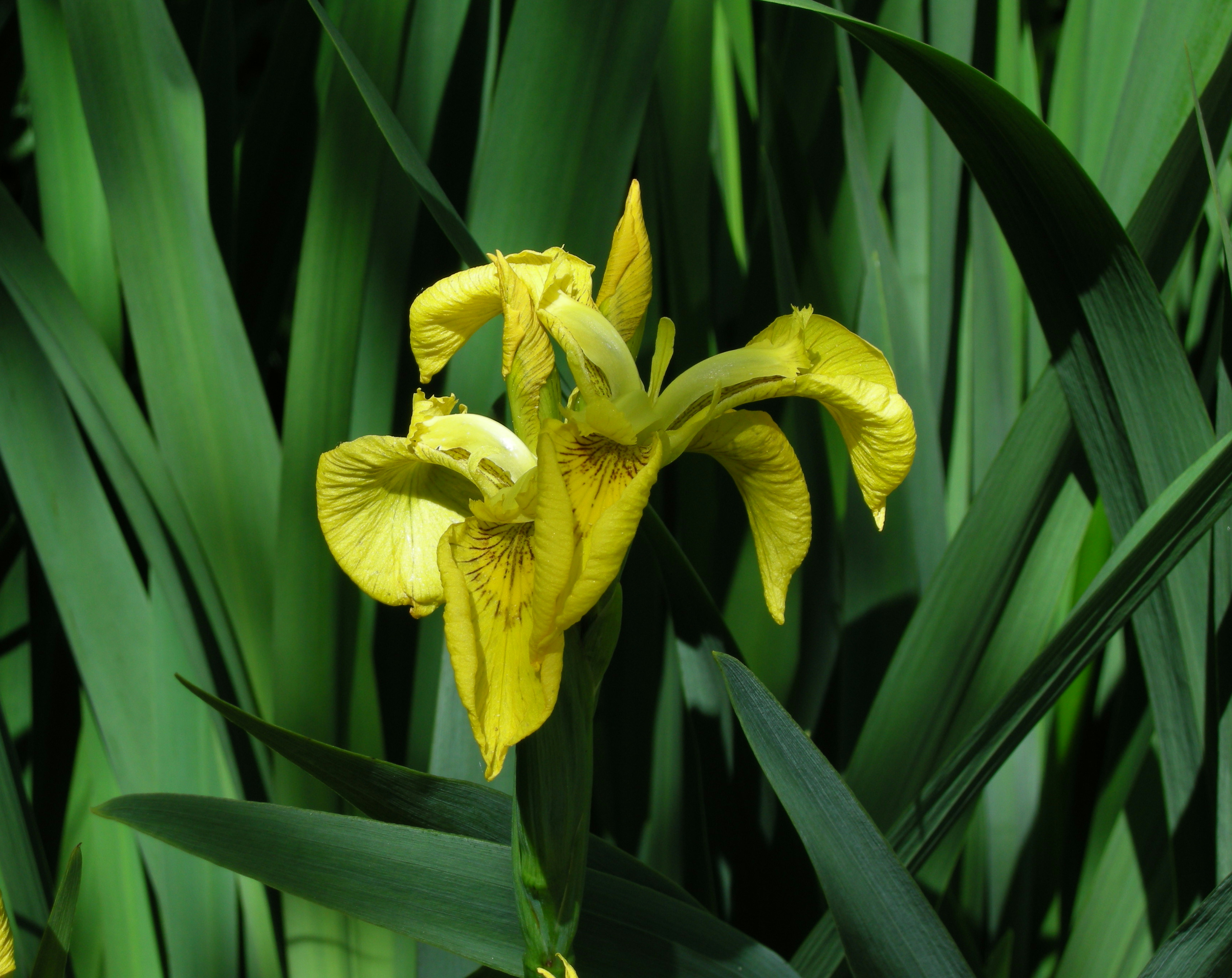
Yellow flag in pond

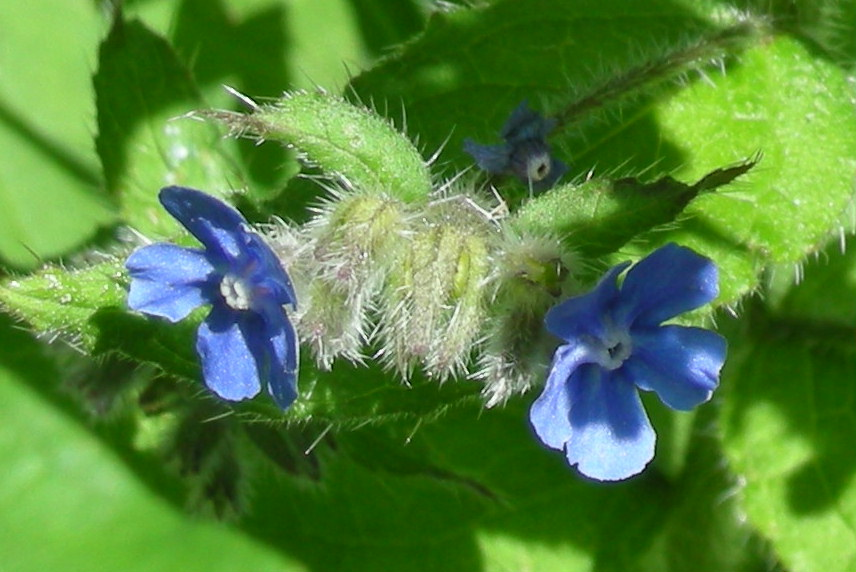
Closeup of green alkanet (pentaglottis sempervirens)

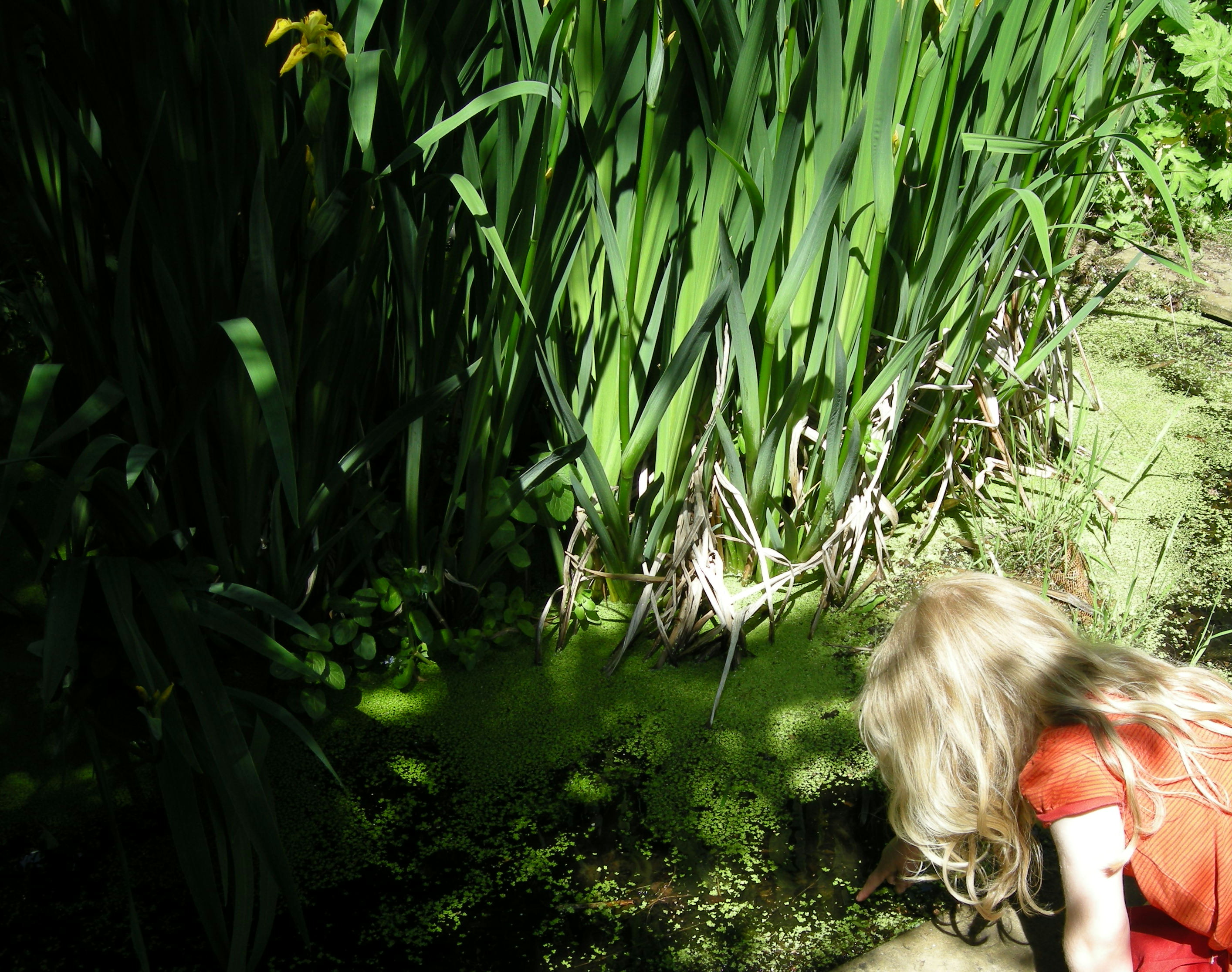
Pond-dipping.

== Baildon Moor and Shipley Glen ==
Across the road from the museum is Baildon Moor which has long been used by the public as a recreation area. There was once a Victorian funfair on the moor, and its story can be read on the wall of the Archaeology room. On the moor opposite Bracken Hall there is a neolithic stone circle. Five minutes' walk away, on the far side of this bit of moor, is Shipley Glen, where some of the Bracken Hall nature walks take place, and where the Roman coin in the Archaeology room was found. There is limited parking on the edge of the moor for visitors to the museum. The museum gardens and moor may be muddy after rain: boots are advisable.

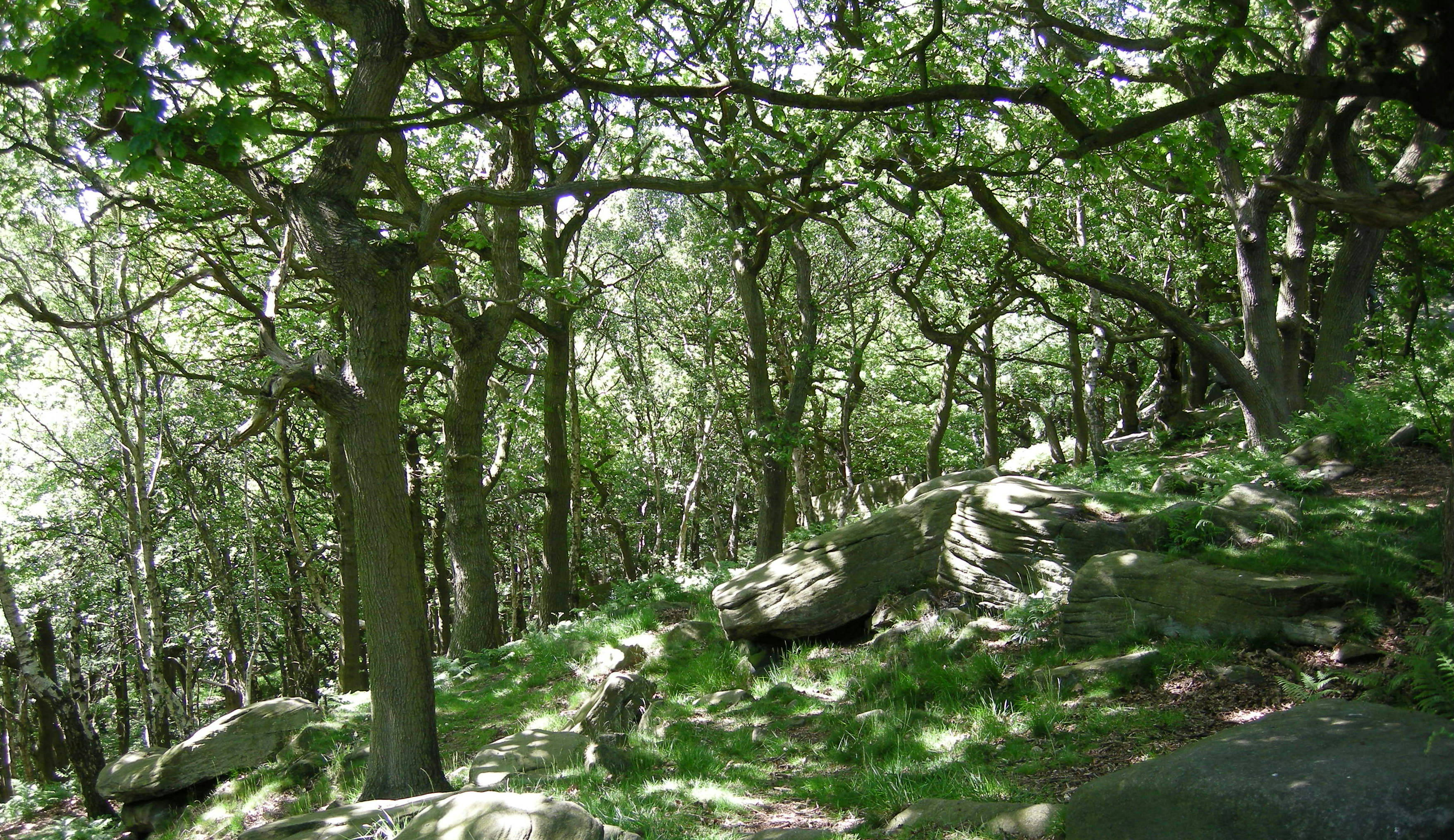
Shipley Glen, near Bracken Hall.
