= Folliot =

Folliot is a given name or surname. Notable people with the name include:

- Hermine Isabelle Maria Gräfin Folliot de Crenneville (1883–1951), Austrian writer and translator
- Louis Charles Folliot de Crenneville (1763–1840), joined the French royal navy in the 1770s, became a general in the Austrian Army
- Franz Folliot de Crenneville (1815–1888), his son and Austrian feldzeugmeister and Oberstkämmerer of Emperor Franz Joseph
- Philippe Folliot (born 1963), French politician, member of the National Assembly of France
- Richard Rasleigh Folliot Scott, PC, (born 1934), India-born British judge
- Gerard Folliot Vaughan (1923–2003), British psychiatrist and politician

== See also ==
- Folliott
- Foliot (disambiguation)
- Follett (disambiguation)
- Follifoot
- Pholiota
