= List of Irish MPs 1692–1693 =

This is a list of members of the Irish House of Commons between 1692 and 1693. There were 300 MPs at a time in this period.

Name	Constituency	Notes
John Allen	County Dublin	
James Barry	Rathcormack	
Thomas Beecher	Baltimore	
Henry Belasyse	Galway Town	
Sir Tristram Beresford	County Londonderry	
Francis Bernard	Clonakilty	
Sir Henry Bingham	County Mayo	
Robert Blennerhassett	Clonmel	
Thomas Bligh	Athboy	
Sir Francis Blundell	King's County	
Chambre Brabazon		
St John Brodrick	County Cork	
Thomas Brodrick	Midleton	
Alan Brodrick	Cork City	
Sir Richard Bulkeley	Fethard (County Wexford)	
Sir Thomas Butler	County Carlow	
Henry Boyle	County Cork	
William Conolly	Donegal Borough	
James Corry	County Fermanagh	
Nehemiah Donnellan	Galway Town	
Edward FitzGerald	County Waterford	
Thomas FitzMaurice		
Francis Folliott	Ballyshannon	
John Folliott	Ballyshannon	
Percy Freke	Clonakilty	
Gustavus Hamilton	County Donegal	
James Hamilton	County Tyrone	
Thomas Handcock		
William Handcock		
William Handcock		
Thomas Knox		
Sir Richard Levinge		
Dudley Loftus		
James Macartney		
William Molyneux		
Sir Donough O'Brien		
Henry Petty		
Arthur Rawdon		
William Robinson	Knocktopher	Surveyor General of Ireland
Robert Rochfort		
Sir John Rogerson		
Sir Oliver St George		
Arthur St George		
John Trevor		
Garret Wesley		
Joseph Williamson		
Cyril Wyche	Dublin University	Secretary to the Lieutenancy of Ireland 1692-93
