= Cromie =

Cromie is a surname. Notable people with the surname include:

- Bob Cromie (1881–1962), Australian rules footballer
- Francis Cromie (1882–1918), British Royal Navy Commander
- Karen Cromie (1979–2011), Northern Irish rower, wheelchair basketball player and Paralympian
- Sir Michael Cromie, 1st Baronet (c. 1744–1824), Anglo-Irish politician
- Robert Cromie (1855–1907), Northern Irish journalist and novelist
- Robert James Cromie (1887–1936), Canadian newspaper publisher

== See also ==
- Cromie baronets
- Cromie McCandless (1921–1992), Northern Irish Grand Prix motorcycle road racer
- Mount Cromie, in Antarctica
