= Folliott =

Folliott is a surname. Notable people with the surname include:

- Francis Folliott (1667–1701), Irish politician
- John Folliott (disambiguation), multiple people
- Henry Folliott (disambiguation), multiple people
- Scott Folliott, fictional character in Foreign Correspondent (film)

== See also ==
- Baron Folliott
