= Henry Folliott, 3rd Baron Folliott =

Irish nobleman and politician

Henry Folliott, 3rd Baron Folliott (died 17 October 1716) was an Irish nobleman and politician.

He inherited the title Baron Folliott and extensive Irish estates on the death in 1697 of his father Thomas Folliott of Ferney Hall, Onibury, Ludlow, Shropshire and Wardtown Castle, Ballymacaward, County Donegal. He sat as member of parliament (MP) for Ballyshannon in the Irish House of Commons from 1695 to 1697.

He married Elizabeth Pudsey, heiress of Langley Hall, Sutton Coldfield in 1677 and built a substantial mansion, Four Oaks Hall, Sutton Coldfield, to a design by architect William Wilson. His one daughter by Elizabeth, Rebecca, died in 1697.

He died without a son and the Barony became extinct on his death. His estates devolved upon a relative, Lieutenant General John Folliott, and upon his five sisters.

Parliament of Ireland
Preceded by Francis Folliott; John Folliott	Member of Parliament for Ballyshannon; 1695–1697; With: Francis Folliott	Succeeded by Francis Folliott; Richard Warburton
Peerage of Ireland
Preceded by Thomas Folliott	Baron Folliott; 1697–1716	Extinct
