= Buried Treasures: The Power of Political Fairy Tales =

2023 book by Jack Zipes

- Cover
- Author: Jack Zipes
- Language: English
- Subject: Literature, fairy tales
- Publisher: Princeton University Press
- Publication date: April 4, 2023 (US); May 30, 2023 (UK)
- Pages: 272
- ISBN: 9780691244730
- Preceded by: The Sorcerer's Apprentice: An Anthology of Magical Tales (2017)

Buried Treasures: The Power of Political Fairy Tales is a 2023 book by Jack Zipes that addresses the significance of nineteenth- and twentieth-century political fairy tales. It profiles writers and illustrators who used the genre to comment on social and political issues. Published by Princeton University Press, it was named a Literary Hub Most Anticipated Book of the Year in 2023.

== Background ==
Zipes is professor emeritus of German and Comparative Literature at the University of Minnesota. His work focuses on uncovering and analyzing neglected fairy tales. He has published and continues to publish numerous translations, collections, and critical studies which emphasize their cultural and political significance. Zipes also founded Neighborhood Bridges, a storytelling and literacy program that sought to help children develop critical literacy skills through creative drama.

== Summary ==
The book opens with an introduction in which Zipes recounts an anecdote involving Albert Einstein, who reportedly advised that children should read fairy tales to develop imagination and understanding of the world. This story frames the author's lifelong interest in retrieving overlooked nineteenth- and twentieth-century fairy tales. In each of the following chapters, Zipes examines a different writer or illustrator, providing biographical context and discussing the political dimensions of their fairy-tale work. The subjects, presented largely in chronological order, include Édouard Laboulaye, Charles Godfrey Leland, Kurt Schwitters, Béla Balázs, Christian Bärmann, Ernst Bloch, Mariette Lydis, Paul Vaillant-Couturier, Hermynia Zur Mühlen, Lisa Tetzner, Felix Salten, and Emery Kelen. Zipes addresses how these figures variously critiqued governmental structures, opposed fascism, explored social inequalities, or advocated for alternative visions of society, often under the constraints of exile or censorship. A separate chapter focuses on Gianni Rodari, whose writings for children incorporated experimental techniques and encouraged creative social engagement. Throughout the book, Zipes includes excerpts from these works and situates them within broader historical and cultural contexts. In the epilogue, he reflects on how such "buried treasures" remain relevant in contemporary discussions of social justice and human rights. The author underscores the continuing power of political fairy tales to challenge prevailing norms.

== Reviews ==
Ann Schmiesing described the collection as a compilation of essays originally featured as introductions or afterwords to various editions of late nineteenth- and early twentieth-century fairy tales. She noted that their arrangement in a single volume underscored thematic connections and contemporary relevance, remarking that "each essay is a gem in itself." She highlighted an anecdote from the introduction, involving advice allegedly given by Albert Einstein, which the author presented as a "true" tall tale. Schmiesing observed that the featured figures navigated significant political upheavals, using fairy tales to critique societal norms and advocate for alternative viewpoints. She added that the volume avoided rigid definitions of what constitutes political fairy tales, instead emphasizing the importance of recovering overlooked authors and artists whose work was overshadowed by modern commercialism. Schmiesing finished by mentioning the epilogue's reflections on current global issues, judging the text as timely and "powerful."

Laurence Talairach said the book highlights to readers "the passion of a 'fairy-tale junkie'" for rediscovering overlooked writers and artists of the nineteenth and twentieth centuries, many of them exiled or of Jewish origin. She noted that the chapters, originally published as articles or book chapters, were brought together to show how these figures employed fairy tales to critique social injustices or imagine utopian futures. She emphasized the author's own role as a persistent collector of hidden or forgotten stories, and praised the volume's demonstration of fairy tales as potent channels for addressing pressing political and cultural concerns.

Laurie Hertzel, senior editor for books at the Star Tribune, stated that the volume contained a series of essays on the subversive meanings of fairy tales, continuing the author's practice of analyzing obscure stories and producing new translations. She noted that the author had previously retranslated Bambi and emphasized its allegorical nature, which differed from the well-known film adaptation. She also mentioned that the new volume appeared alongside a three-volume set of global fairy tales, all of which she found to be beautifully illustrated. Hertzel reported that the author would discuss these works at a local event, focusing on the broader significance of legend, myth, and fairy tales in contemporary discourse.

In her review, American historian Jean R. Freedman described the work as a collection of essays about unconventional fairy tale authors, noting that many of the pieces had been published previously but gained coherence when brought together under a single heading. She observed that the author's background in German and Jewish studies shaped the selection of material, though the volume also included contributors from other cultures. She cited a personal anecdote involving Albert Einstein in the introductory chapter and highlighted an essay on Felix Salten that provided both a social and political context for his writing. She remarked that the central theme concerned the ways fairy tales inhabit the real world while proposing alternate realms of possibility, capable of illustrating both constructive and destructive models of behavior. Freedman acknowledged a few minor issues, such as a brief treatment of Bruno Bettelheim's scholarship and what she thought as an ambiguous language around "Italian witches," but generally described the volume as a nuanced, wide-ranging study that continued the author's significant contributions to fairy tale research.

Terry Potter praised the author's accessible style and commitment to community, describing the individual as a "mensch." (Note: Mensch – a term defined by Leo Rosten as "someone to admire and emulate, someone of noble character.") He observed that the collection contained essays on overlooked authors and illustrators from the nineteenth and twentieth centuries, underscoring their political relevance and the role of fairy tales in challenging dominant social discourses. He highlighted one essay on Hungarian writer Béla Balázs as especially noteworthy, given its examination of cultural and political complexity. He noted the author's steadfast belief in literature as a source of optimism, even in the face of recent global crises, and cited the text's emphasis on how stories can expose the actions of ruling classes and foster critical thinking.
