= Roberts baronets of Milner Field (1909) =

The Roberts baronetcy, of Milner Field in Bingley in the West Riding of the County of York, was created in the Baronetage of the United Kingdom on 30 November 1909 for James Roberts. He was Chairman of Sir Titus Salt, Sons & Co, of Saltaire, Yorkshire.

The baronetcy as of 2026 is vacant.

== Roberts baronets, of Milner Field (1909) ==
- Sir James Roberts, 1st Baronet (1848–1935)
- Sir James Denby Roberts, 2nd Baronet (1904–1973)
- Sir William James Denby Roberts, 3rd Baronet (1936–2012)
- Sir James Elton Denby Roberts-Buchanan, 4th Baronet (born 1966). His name does not appear on the Official Roll of the Baronetage.

== Notes ==
Baronetage of the United Kingdom
Preceded by Kleinwort baronets	Roberts baronets of Milner Field; 30 November 1909	Succeeded by Ewart baronets
