= Siege of Užice =

The siege of Užice refers to military engagements on the city and town of Užice, now in Serbia. It may refer to:

- Siege of Užice (1738), by Habsburgs against Ottomans
- Siege of Užice (1805), by Serbians against Dahije
