= Sixpence in her Shoe =

Sixpence in her Shoe may refer to:

- A 1963 book by Phyllis McGinley
- A book by Frances McNeil about the history of the Leeds Children's Holiday Camp Association
- "a silver sixpence in her shoe" in British wedding lore, in the rhyme "Something old"
