= Bromfield railway station =

Bromfield railway station may refer to the following stations in England:

- Bromfield railway station (Cumbria)
- Bromfield railway station (Shropshire)
