= Kleinwort =

Kleinwort may refer to:

- Kleinwort Baronets
- Kleinwort Benson
- Kleinwort Hambros
