= Bolnore =

Bolnore may refer to:

- Bolnore Village, a 21st-century village built close Haywards Heath, West Sussex, England
- Kleinwort baronets, of Bolnore, Sussex County, England, a title in the Baronetage of the United Kingdom
