= Franz Wenzel von Wallis =

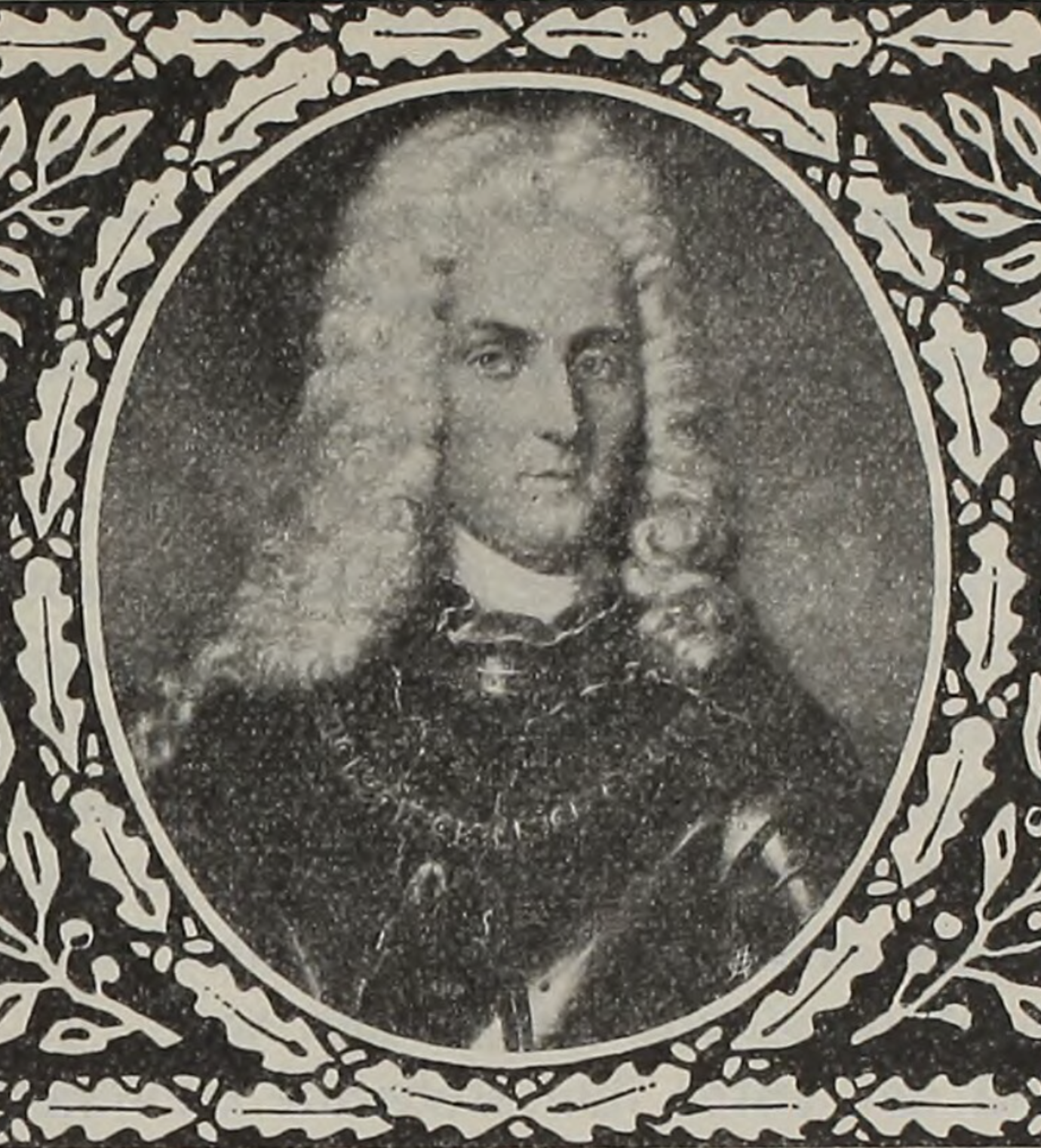
Portrait of Franz Wenzel von Wallis

Franz Wenzel, Count von Wallis auf Carrighmain (4 October 1696 – Vienna, 14 January 1774) was an Imperial Field Marshal, Knight of the Golden Fleece, and Governor of Transylvania.

== Biography ==
=== Early life ===
Wallis came from the old, originally Irish, Wallis von Carighmain family, whose Irish ancestor, Richard Wallis, entered Imperial service and was killed at the Battle of Lützen in 1632. Franz Wenzel came from the Budwitz line and was the only son of Baron Franz Ernst von Wallis auf Carrighmain (died 1702) and his wife, Baroness Anna Theresia von Rziczan (died 1722).

He initially studied law and philosophy in Leipzig and Prague, after which he would enter the Imperial administration. He then joined the Imperial Army and became a lieutenant in the grenadiers of the Jung-Daun Infantry Regiment. He saw his first action at the Siege of Freiburg im Breisgau in 1713. He fought in the Austro-Turkish War (1716–1718) and against the Spanish in Sicily in 1720.
In 1727, a report by the English plenipotentiary Saint-Saphorin called him one of the most talented and well-informed officers in the Austrian Army. By this time, Wallis had already risen to the rank of colonel.

In 1731, he became commander of the 59th Infantry Regiment, was promoted to Generalfeldwachtmeister in 1733, and served with the army in Italy. He was wounded in the Battle of San Pietro on 29 June 1734. In 1735, he was promoted to Lieutenant Field Marshal and served under Feldzeugmeister Friedrich Heinrich von Seckendorff on the Rhine. On 17 April 1736, he was appointed Imperial War Councilor and transferred to János Pálffy's army in Hungary. There, he distinguished himself in the Austro-Turkish War (1737-1739) during the Siege of Užice and the campaigns of 1738 and 1739.

=== War of the Austrian Succession ===
In 1739, he became commander of the 11th Infantry Regiment. In November 1739, he was transferred to the fortress of Głogów, which he initially had to restore to a usable condition. On 16 December 1740, Frederick II marched into Silesia, and the First Silesian War broke out. The Austrians had already evacuated Silesia, leaving only weak garrisons in the fortresses of Głogów, Brzeg, and Nysa.

At the beginning of January 1741, the Prussians under Leopold II, Prince of Anhalt-Dessau reached Głogów and demanded a surrender, which was rejected. A second demand followed in early March, which was also rejected. On the night of 8-9 March, the Prussians stormed the fortress; the Austrians only noticed the attack when the Prussians had already climbed over the ramparts. Wallis and Major General Franz Wenzel von Reisky von Dubnitz (1687-1741) attempted to organize a resistance but were taken prisoner. Wallis was taken to Berlin and interned there, but was exchanged on 10 August, shortly before the armistice on 9 October 1741.

This did not affect Wallis's career. In May 1742, he joined the army in Bavaria, and in July he was appointed Feldzeugmeister . In November 1742, he distinguished himself at the Siege of Litoměřice.

During the Second Silesian War, he served in the campaigns of 1743 and 1744, initially on the Rhine, in the Upper Palatinate, and in Bohemia under the command of Duke Charles Alexander of Lorraine. When Frederick II threatened Prague, the army was quickly relocated to Bohemia. There, he fought at Habelschwerdt on 14 February 1745, and in the Battle of Hohenfriedberg on 4 June.

=== Later life ===
After the war, Wallis was transferred to Transylvania as commanding general on 21 October 1751, and remained there until 1758 as Governor of Transylvania. On 29 June 1754, he was promoted to Field marshal and awarded the Order of the Golden Fleece (No. 776) on 30 November 1765.

He died in Vienna in 1774, and was buried in the family grave in Mährisch Budwitz.

=== Marriage and children ===
On 23 July 1726, Wallis married Countess Maria Rosa Regina von Thürheim (1705-1777), daughter of Count Franz Sebastian von Thürheim. The couple had 7 children:

- Franz Ernst (1729–1784), Imperial Chamberlain, married Countess Maria Maximiliane von Schaffgotsch
- Michael Johann Ignaz (1732–1798), Imperial Field Marshal, Knight of Malta
- Olivier Remigius (1742–1799), Imperial Feldzeugmeister
- Joseph (1747–1793), Canon in Olomouc
- Antonia (1732), Salesian nun
- Carolina (1737–1761), Salesian nun
- Rosa (1744)
