= Bromfield railway station (Shropshire) =

Former railway station in Shropshire, England

Bromfield
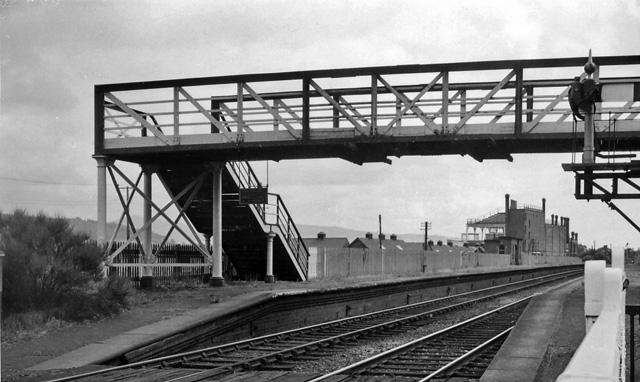
- The closed station in 1963

General information
- Location: Bromfield, Shropshire; England
- Coordinates: 52.3931°N 2.7556°W
- Grid reference: SO486775

Other information
- Status: Disused

History
- Original company: Shrewsbury and Hereford Railway
- Pre-grouping: LNWR and GWR joint
- Post-grouping: LMS and GWR joint

Key dates
- 1852: Opened
- 1958: Closed for regular passenger services
- 1965: closed completely
Location

Bromfield railway station was a station in Bromfield, Shropshire, England. The station was opened in 1852 and closed for regular passenger train services in 1958. but was occasionally used for special trains on race days at the adjacent Ludlow Racecourse until April 1965.

After closure the station buildings and platforms were demolished. Bromfield Signal Box which is next to the adjacent level crossing remains open.

Preceding station	Disused railways	Following station
Onibury; Line open, station closed	LNWR and GWR joint Shrewsbury and Hereford Railway	Ludlow; Line and station open
