= Henry Folliott =

Henry Folliott may refer to:

- Henry Folliott, 1st Baron Folliott (1568–1622) of Ireland
- Henry Folliott, 3rd Baron Folliott (died 1716) of Ireland
