= Louis Charles Folliot de Crenneville =

Austrian general (1763–1840)

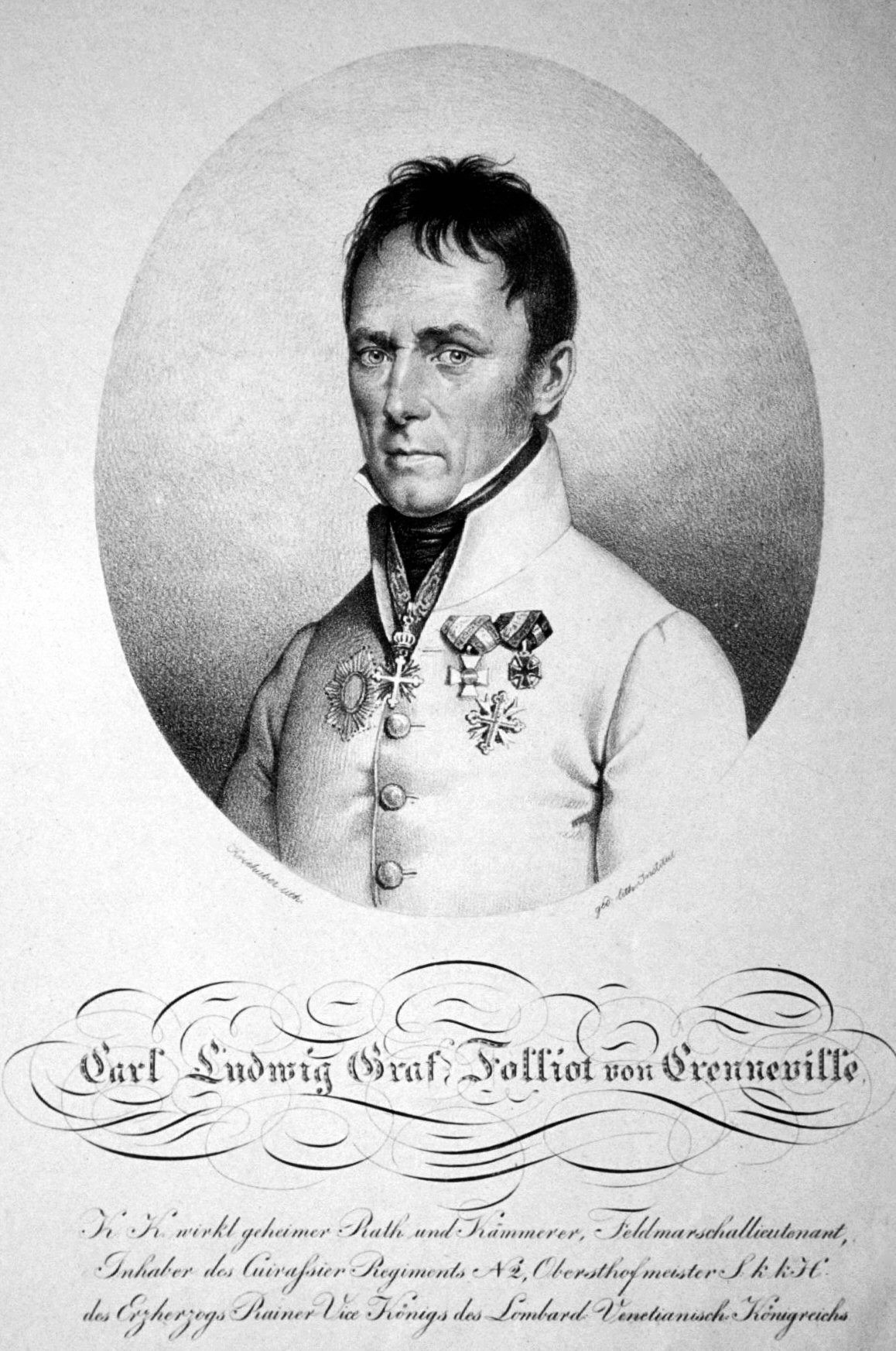
- Born: 3 July 1763; Metz, Kingdom of France
- Died: 21 June 1840 (aged 76); Vienna, Austrian Empire
- Military career
- Allegiance: France; Austrian Empire
- Branch: Cavalry
- Service years: France: 1778–1791; Austria: 1793–1840
- Rank: General der Kavallerie
- Conflicts: French Revolutionary Wars; Napoleonic Wars
- Awards: Military Order of Maria Theresa; Order of Alexander Nevsky; Order of Saints Maurice and Lazarus
- Other work: Chamberlain, 1798; Privy Councillor, 1823

Louis Charles Folliot de Crenneville (3 July 1763 – 21 June 1840) joined the French royal navy in the 1770s. During the French Revolution he abandoned the French First Republic and became an Émigré. Soon afterward, he tendered his services to Habsburg Austria. He earned promotion to general officer during the Napoleonic Wars and fought in all the major campaigns against his former country. He led a division during the War of the Sixth Coalition and remained in Austrian service until his death.

== Life ==
Louis Charles Folliot de Crenneville was born in Metz on July 3, 1763. Early, he chose a military career. In 1778, he became an officer in the French Navy, where he remained until 1791. In 1792, he searched for a way to remain serviceable and loyal to his King. He remained in the Royal Navy and fought in various French colonies against the French revolutionaries. In 1793, Charles Folliot became a cadet in the 1st regiment of light horse "Kaiser". In 1794, he was promoted to lieutenant. Charles Folliot was rapidly promoted to lieutenant. In 1797, he was promoted to captain, and was put in charge of the shipment of Austrian troops for the expedition of Istria and Dalmatia.

In 1798, Folliot was sent to St. Petersburg with Prince Ferdinand of Württemberg. On his return, he was promoted to Major and was appointed orderly officer to Prince Ferdinand of Austria. In 1800, he served with the 6th Regiment of Dragoons of Saxe-Coburg. He fought at Engen and Hohen. Then, Louis Folliot was promoted to colonel and took command of his regiment. When this regiment was disbanded in 1801, Charles Folliot was appointed Generaladjutant by the Austrian Archduke Charles Louis of Austria. The March 9, 1805, he was promoted to Generalmajor. In April 1805 he was sent to Venice to defend the city against the French. After this mission, Folliot was named "Adlatus" the headquarters of the army in Germany. In 1806, Louis was appointed Commanding General Folliot Fiume, Croatia. During the winter of 1807 he fought in Slavonia. He then went to Bohemia, as commander of a brigade.

During the 1809 campaign, Folliot commanded the vanguard of the army corps of General Johann Kollowrat. He then fought in Regen, on the river Naab, and near Linz. In spring 1813, the Earl of Crenneville was promoted Feldmarschalleutnant. As division commander, he distinguished himself at the battle of Dresden, then at the battle of Leipzig. He took a redoubt in Hochheim am Main, near Mainz, November 9, with two pistols and a flag. In 1814, he fought at Laferté-sur-Aube. He also participated in the fighting at Arcis-sur-Aube, 20 March 1814. On 1 June, the Emperor of Austria awarded him the Knight's Cross of the Military Order of Maria Theresa, and made him the second colonel proprietor of the Erzherzog Franz Cuirassier Regiment Nr. 2.

In 1815, Folliot of Crenneville commanded the vanguard of the Austrian army in Piedmont and fought Meillerie, June 21, and Saxons and Great St Genix, June 28 He then captured the towns of Chalon-sur-Saône and Lyon. In 1823, Count Crenneville was appointed advisor to the Rainier Archduke of Austria, viceroy of Lombardy-Venetia. In 1831 he was promoted to the rank of "General der Kavallerie. He was finally appointed commander of the Austrian Gardes du Corps Regiment in Vienna. He kept this honorific title until his death, on 21 June 1840.

== Marriage and Children ==
Folliot de Crenneville married, on May 1, 1810, Judith Charlotte Victoire de Poutet (1789–1887), and had 3 sons :

- Karl (March 28, 1811, Vienna - July 21, 1873, Linz), married to Anna (1821–1896), countess Lazansky,
- Louis or Ludwig (January 22, 1813, Vienna - April 21, 1876, Montreux, Switzerland), 14th and last Governor of Transylvania (1861–1867);
- Franz Folliot de Crenneville (March 22, 1815, Sopron, Hungary - June 22, 1888, Gmunden), Austrian general who took part in the battles of Montebello and Solferino (1859).

Folliot de Crenneville was the great-grandfather of Austrian writer and translator Hermynia Zur Mühlen.

== Promotions ==
- Major: 1798
- Oberstleutnant: 1800
- Oberst: 1800
- Generalmajor: 09.03.1805 (w.r.f. 02.09.1805)
- Feldmarschalleutnant: 27.04.1813
- General der Kavallerie: 09.03.1831

== Awards and decorations ==
- Orders, Awards, Honorary Appointments (Austria)
- Military Maria Theresian Order (Austria)– KC: 01.06.1814
- Military Honor Cross 1813/14 (Austria) (Army Cross 1813/14): ~ 1814
- 2nd Colonel-Proprietor of the Cuirassier Regiment N°2 (Austria): 1814 – 21.06.1840
- I.R. Privy Councillor (Austria): 1823
- I.R. Chamberlain (Austria): 1798
- Civil Order of Merit of the Bavarian Crown (Bavaria)– GC: 1833
- Constantinian Order of St. George (Parma)– GC: 1826
- Order of St. Alexander Nevskij (Russia): 1833
- Order of St. Anne 2nd cl. (Russia): 1814 / 1st cl.: before 1826
- Order of St. Maurice and St. Lazarus (Sardinia-Piedmont) – GC: before 1826

== Sources ==
- Salis-Samaden, (Carl von): General der Cavallerie Ludwig Carl Graf Folliot de Crenneville. Biographische Skizze, Vienne, 1885.
- Petiot, Alain : Les Lorrains et l'Empire, LORE, 2005
