= Ludlow railway station =

Railway station in Shropshire, England

Ludlow
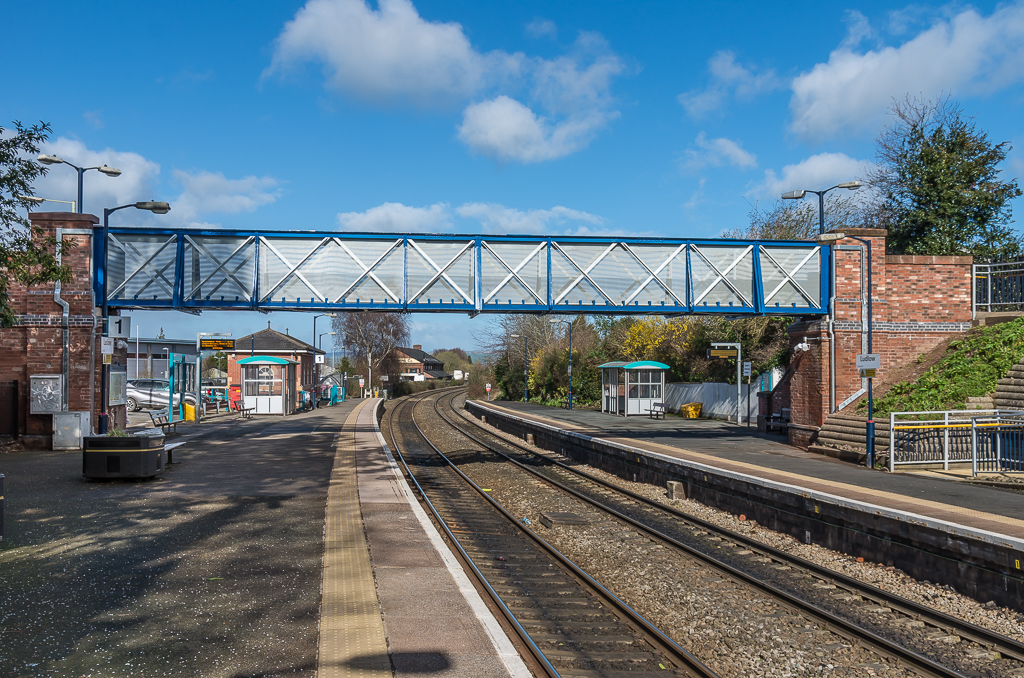

General information
- Location: Ludlow, Shropshire, England
- Coordinates: 52.371°N 2.716°W
- Grid reference: SO513750
- Manager: Transport for Wales
- Platforms: 2

Other information
- Station code: LUD
- Classification: DfT category E

History
- Opened: 1852

Passengers
- 2020/21: ▼65,540
- Interchange: ▼297
- 2021/22: ▲0.200 million
- Interchange: ▲1,638
- 2022/23: ▲0.235 million
- Interchange: ▼822
- 2023/24: ▲0.238 million
- Interchange: ▲970
- 2024/25: ▲0.271 million
- Interchange: ▼477
Location
Notes
- Passenger statistics from the Office of Rail and Road

Ludlow railway station serves the market town of Ludlow, in Shropshire, England. It lies on the Welsh Marches Line between Shrewsbury 27 miles 42 chains (44.3 km) to the north and Hereford to the south.

== History ==
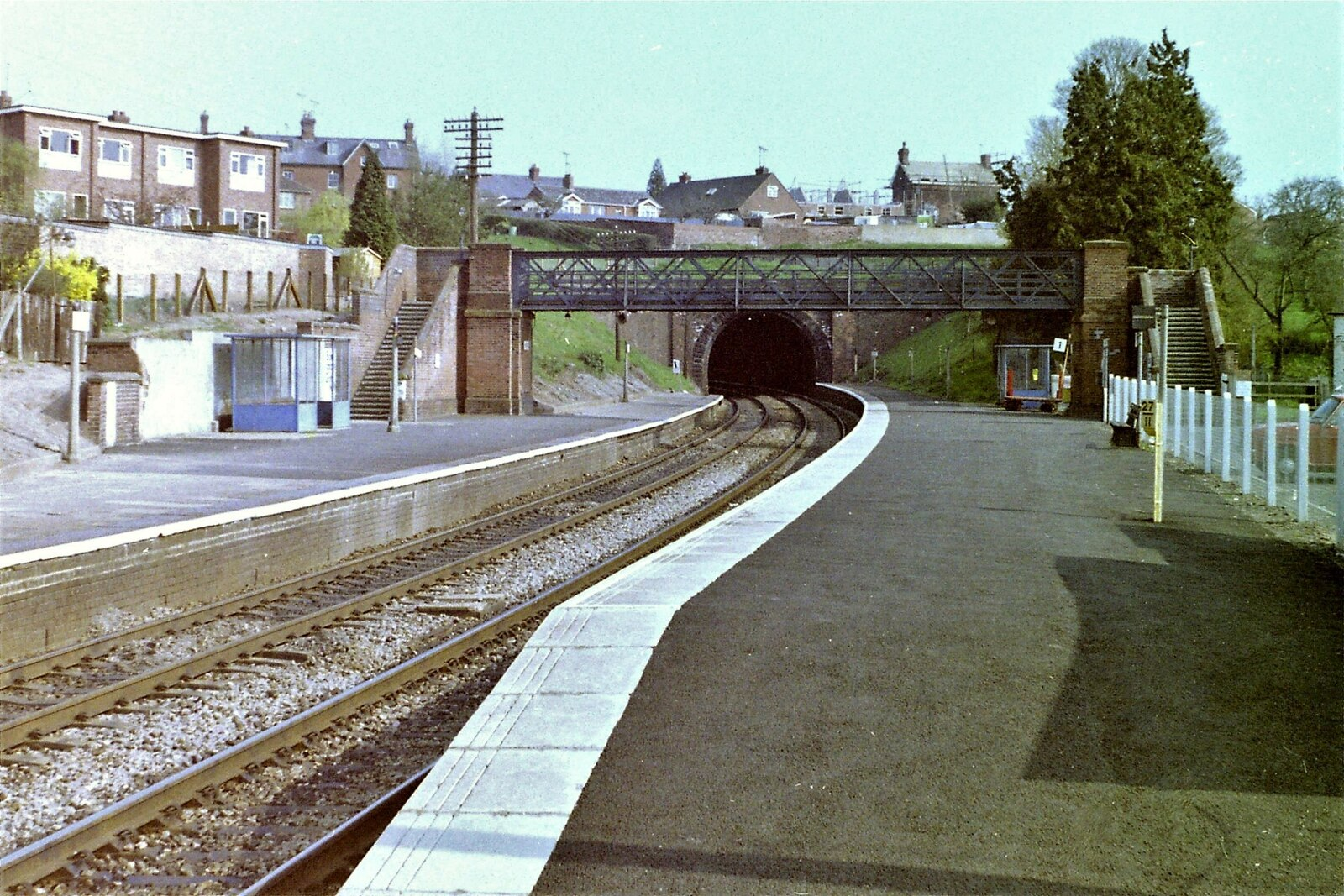
The station seen in 1984

The station opened on 21 April 1852, as the southern terminus of the first section of the Shrewsbury and Hereford Railway. Trains travelling to or from the south of the station pass through the short Ludlow Tunnel (192 yards (176 m) long), which passes under Gravel Hill and has its tunnel entrance immediately south of the platforms. Clee Hill Junction, from where a freight-only branch line ran to the quarries in the nearby Clee Hills, to the east of Ludlow, from 1864 to 1962, was situated 24 chains (about a quarter of a mile) to the north of the station.

The goods shed (on the former goods yard that closed in 1968) adjacent to the railway line to the north of Station Drive is now home to the Ludlow Brewery. It has been renovated and is open to the public, with information on local railway history.

=== Accidents and incidents ===
At 3.15 am on 6 September 1956, a northbound parcels train, hauled by GWR 4300 Class 2-6-0 No. 9306, overran signals and ran into the rear of an express passenger train from Penzance to Manchester London Road carrying 150 passengers, but caused no deaths and only one serious shock casualty. The passenger train had halted because a lorry that had crashed into a level crossing at Onibury station had blocked the track.

== Facilities ==
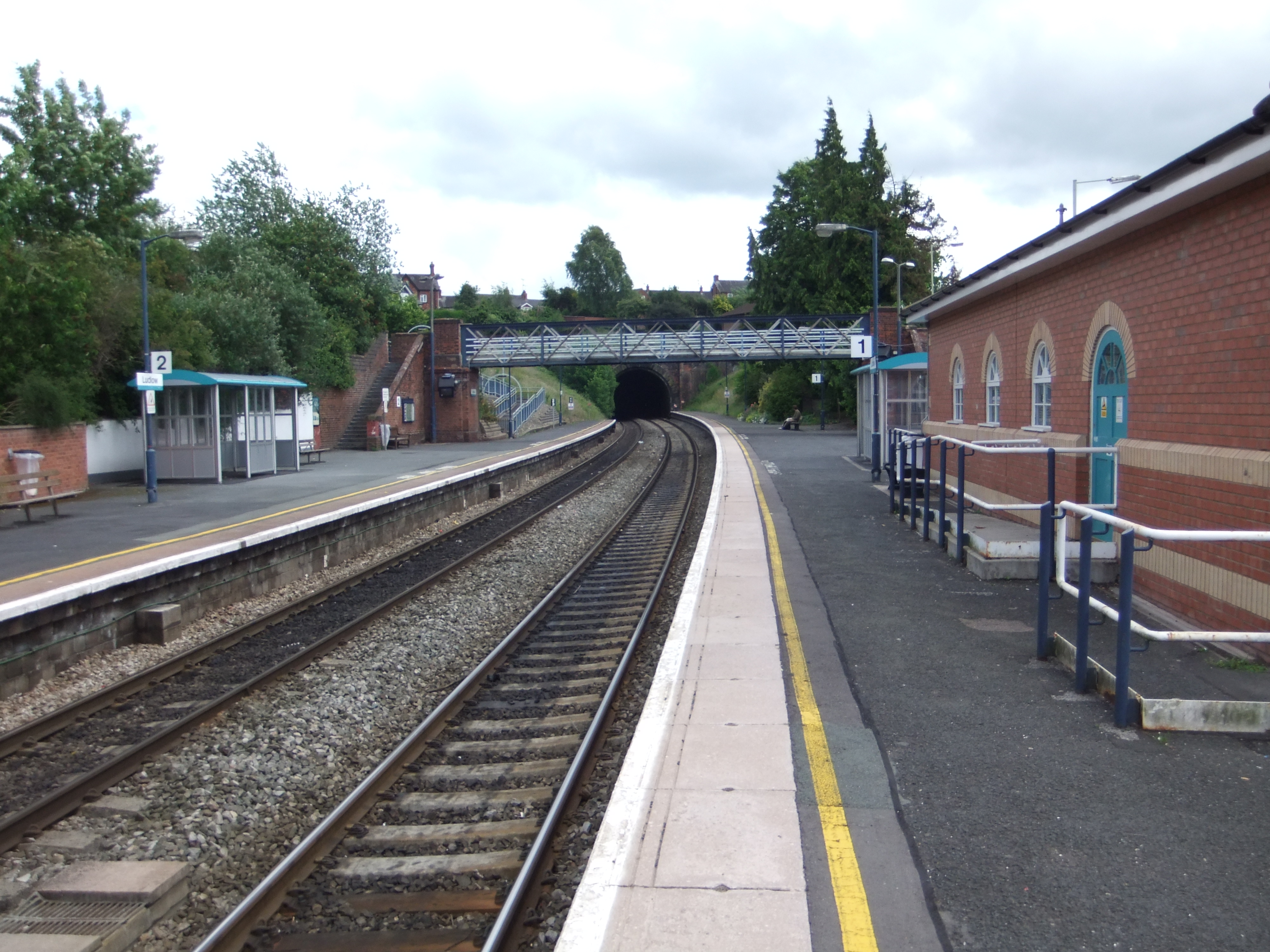
Looking south towards Ludlow Tunnel, with the ticket office on the right

There are two platforms — platform 1 is the northbound platform (for Shrewsbury) and platform 2 is the southbound platform (for Hereford). There is level access to the ticket office and platform 1, the footbridge can now be reached by a recently installed lift from that platform. Level access to platform 2 is via a ramp down from Quarry Gardens, which also provides a ramp to the platform from the footbridge. A long path also provides a level access route that runs over the tunnel entrance between the platforms.

Facilities include an independently-run ticket office, where railway-related books and light refreshments are available to buy, car parking, small weatherproof platform shelters, and an accessible adapted toilet.

== Passenger volume ==
Passenger Volume at Ludlow
	2004–05	2005–06	2006–07	2007–08	2008–09	2009–10	2010–11	2011–12	2012–13	2013–14	2014–15	2015–16	2016–17	2017–18	2018–19	2019–20	2020–21	2021–22	2022–23
Entries and exits	213,843	224,250	242,381	272,381	287,800	270,682	288,058	292,734	297,798	287,350	308,384	299,776	299,802	300,742	286,854	266,090	65,540	199,780	234,958
Interchanges	0	0	0	0	0	0	299	3,656	2,845	2,509	3,395	3,204	3,185	2,916	3,878	1,954	297	1,638	822

The statistics cover twelve month periods that start in April.

== Services ==
Passenger services are currently provided by Transport For Wales. The standard off-peak weekday service in trains per hour is:

- 1tph to Manchester Piccadilly, via Shrewsbury, Chester and Crewe
- 1tph to Cardiff Central, via Hereford and Newport; alternate services are extended to Carmarthen, Fishguard Harbour, Milford Haven or Pembroke Dock
- 1tp2h to Holyhead, via Shrewsbury and Chester
- 1tp2h to Cardiff Central, via Hereford and Newport.

Preceding station	National Rail	Following station
Leominster	Transport for Wales; Welsh Marches Line	Craven Arms or Shrewsbury
Hereford	Transport for Wales; Premier Service	Shrewsbury

== See also ==
- Railways of Shropshire

== Bibliography ==
- Marshall, Geoff; Pipe, Vicki (2018). The Railway Adventures: Places, Trains, People and Stations. September Publishing. ISBN 978-1910463871.
- Mitchell, Vic; Smith, Keith (2008). Shrewsbury to Ludlow. Middleton Press. pp. 115–120. ISBN 9781906008215. OCLC 520487698.
- Quick, Michael (2023). Railway Passenger Stations in Great Britain: A Chronology (PDF) (5th ed.). London: Railway and Canal Historical Society.
