= Stokesay Court =

Country house and estate in Onibury, Shropshire, England

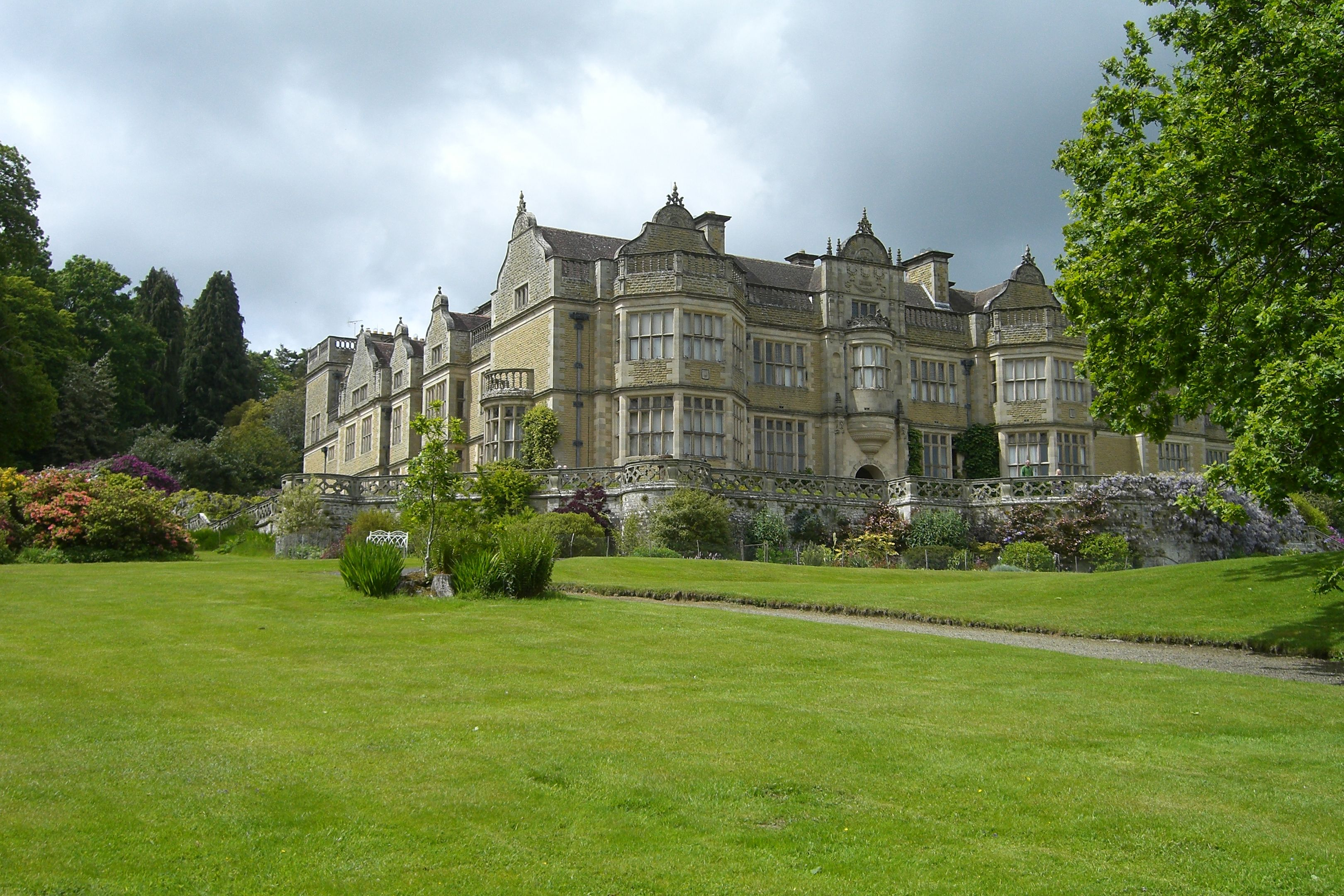
- "The most grandiloquent Victorian mansion in the county"

- Location within Shropshire
- 52.4029°N 2.8179°W
- Location: Onibury, Shropshire, England

History
- Built: 1889–1895
- Built for: John Derby Allcroft
- Original use: Country house

Site notes
- Architect: Thomas Harris
- Architectural style: Jacobethan
- Governing body: Privately owned

Listed Building – Grade II*
- Official name: Stokesay Court
- Designated: 28 January 1974
- Reference no.: 1269851

Listed Building – Grade II
- Official name: Stables, outbuildings and house at Stokesay Court
- Designated: 15 March 1974
- Reference no.: 1269855

Listed Building – Grade II
- Official name: Bridge on drive at Stokesay Court
- Designated: 21 June 1996
- Reference no.: 1269852

Listed Building – Grade II
- Official name: Lodge and attached wall at Stokesay Court
- Designated: 15 March 1974
- Reference no.: 1269854

Listed Building – Grade II
- Official name: Entrance gates, piers, wing walls and screens at Stokesay Court
- Designated: 15 March 1974
- Reference no.: 1269853

Stokesay Court is a country house and estate in the parish of Onibury (but named after Stokesay) in Shropshire, England. Described by John Newman, in the Shropshire volume of Pevsner's Buildings of England, as "the most grandiloquent Victorian mansion in the county", Stokesay is a Grade II* listed building.

== History ==
Stokesay Court was built for John Derby Allcroft. His architect was Thomas Harris. Allcroft had made his fortune as a glover, his father having entered a successful partner with Dents that saw the company led by Allcroft, and renamed Dent, Allcroft & Co., become the biggest manufacturer in the world. Allcroft was also a philanthropist, Christian evangelist and church-builder, and member of parliament. He funded the construction of churches including St Matthew's, Bayswater, St Jude's Church, Kensington (now St Mellitus College), and St Martin's, Gospel Oak and served as Treasurer and major benefactor to Christ's Hospital school. He purchased the estate, including Stokesay Castle, which he felt unsuitable as a residence, and an existing small house, which did not meet the needs of his expanding family, in 1868; adding to his landholdings in 1874 by the purchase of adjacent land, which he chose as the site for his mansion.

Work lasted from 1889 to 1892, finishing only six months before Derby Allcroft's death. The house was one of England's first to have integral electric light, installed by Edmundsons in 1891. The gardens were laid out by Henry Ernest Milner. The house passed to John's son Herbert and then firstly to his son Russell and, after his death in 1950, to his daughter Jewell, who had married the biographer, Sir Philip Magnus in 1943. During the First World War, the house served as an Auxiliary Military Hospital for convalescent soldiers, and in the Second as a temporary home for the evacuated students of Lancing College and a Western Command Junior Leaders' School. Following Jewell Magnus-Allcroft's death in 1992, the estate was inherited by descendants who sold the contents of the house at a major sale through Sotheby's in 1994 to fund building repairs. The sale of the contents, described by Marcus Binney as "exceptionally complete", raised £4.5 million. Stokesay Court is now owned by Jewell's niece, Caroline Magnus.

The court was the main location for the filming of the 2007 movie Atonement.

== Architecture and description ==
The site looks out over Ludlow and the Clee Hills. Described by John Newman as "the most grandiloquent Victorian mansion in the county", Stokesay Court is a Grade II* listed building.

== See also ==
- Grade II* listed buildings in Shropshire Council (H–Z)
- Listed buildings in Onibury

== Sources ==
- Binney, Marcus (2007). In Search of the Perfect House: 500 of the Best Buildings in Britain and Ireland. London, UK: Weidenfeld & Nicolson. ISBN 9-780297-84455-6.
- Newman, John; Pevsner, Nikolaus (2006). Shropshire. The Buildings of England. New Haven, US and London: Yale University Press. ISBN 0-300-12083-4.
