= Franz Folliot de Crenneville =

Austrian feldzeugmeister (artillery general)

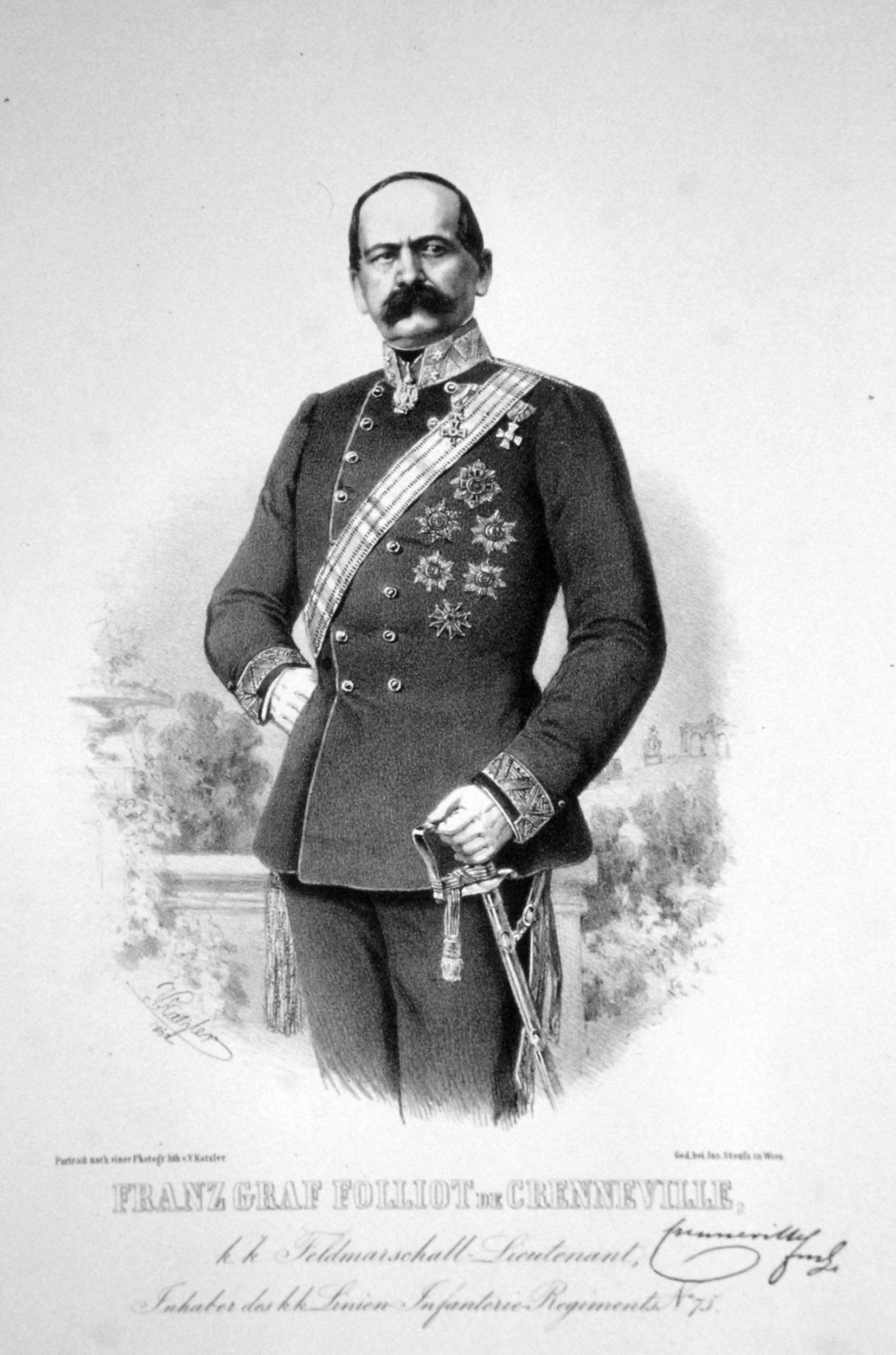
Franz Folliot de Crenneville, Lithography by Vinzenz Katzler, 1862

Count Franz Folliot de Crenneville (Sopron, March 22, 1815 - Gmunden, June 22, 1888), was an Austrian feldzeugmeister (artillery general) and Oberstkämmerer of Emperor Franz Joseph I.

== Biography ==
Folliot de Crenneville was the son of Louis Charles Folliot de Crenneville, a French nobleman who served in the Austrian army since the French Revolution. Franz Folliot de Crenneville also joined the Austrian army and quickly made a career there.

In 1857 he was promoted to Lieutenant-Field Marshal and became a Division General in Kolozsvár (Transylvania) and Croatia. Afterwards he distinguished himself at the Battle of Solferino, after which he was appointed Secretary and First Adjutant-General of the Emperor. His brother Ludwig was Governor of Transylvania from 1860 until 1867, when it became an integral part of the kingdom of Hungary.

After his appointment as feldzeugmeister in 1867, he retired from military service and was appointed Oberstkämmerer (Supreme Chamberlain) by Emperor Franz Joseph. In this capacity he dedicated himself to the reorganization of the Imperial art collections and was responsible for awarding travel grants to young artists. The count was the holder of various decorations, such as a Knight of the Order of the Golden Fleece (1867), the Grand Cross of the Austrian Order of Leopold (1860) and the Danish Order of the Elephant (1879).

After his retirement in 1884, he lived in his mountain castle near Gmunden and devoted himself to the study of the history of that city. From 1887 his official surname was Folliot de Crenneville-Poutet, after the surname of his late mother Baroness Victoria de Poutet was added to his name with the permission of the Emperor.

Folliot de Crenneville was married to Hermine Chotek von Chotkow und Wognin. They had 3 sons :

- Victor Graf Folliot de Creneville-Poutet (1847-1920), father of writer Hermynia Zur Mühlen
- Heinrich Otto Graf Folliot de Crenneville-Poutet (1855-1929)
- Franz Graf Folliot de Creneville-Poutet (1856-1935)

== Sources ==
- ADB
- BLKÖ
- Deutsche Biographie
