= Listed buildings in Onibury =

Onibury is a civil parish in Shropshire, England. It contains 25 listed buildings that are recorded in the National Heritage List for England. Of these, two are at Grade II*, the middle of the three grades, and the others are at Grade II, the lowest grade. The parish contains the village of Onibury and the surrounding countryside. Most of the listed buildings are houses, cottages, farm houses and farm buildings, the earliest of which are timber framed. The oldest building is a church, which is listed together with items in the churchyard. In the parish are a country house and a mansion, both of which are listed, together with associated structures. The other listed buildings include a gazebo, a former railway station, a war memorial, and a telephone kiosk.

== Key ==
Grade	Criteria
II*	Particularly important buildings of more than special interest
II	Buildings of national importance and special interest

== Buildings ==
Name and location	Photograph	Date	Notes	Grade
St Michael's Church; 52.40775°N 2.80135°W		12th century	The oldest part of the church is the nave, the chancel was extended in the 13th century, there were later alterations, and the church was restored in 1902–03. It is built in sandstone with a Welsh slate roof, and consists of a nave, a south porch, a chancel, and a west tower. The tower has a clock face and an embattled parapet. The porch is timber framed and gabled with cusped bargeboards. Inside the church, the Norman chancel arch has survived.	II*
50 Onibury; 52.40878°N 2.80274°W	—	Late 16th or early 17th century	The house was extended in the 19th century. The original part is timber framed with plaster infill on a stone plinth and the roof is tiled. There are two storeys, a front of three bays, and a later stone rear wing. The upper storey is jettied, with a moulded bressumer on curved brackets, and in the gable end with a prominent moulded sill and a central moulded console. The windows are casements.	II
51 Onibury; 52.40924°N 2.80270°W	—	Late 17th or early 18th century	A house, partly timber framed with plaster infill, and partly in sandstone, with a thatched roof. There is a single storey and an attic. The windows are casements and there is an eyebrow dormer.	II
52 and 53 Onibury; 52.40926°N 2.80229°W	—	17th or 18th century	A house, partly timber framed with plaster infill, partly in sandstone, roughcast at the rear, with a thatched roof. There is a single storey and an attic, three bays, a lean-to on the right, and a rear single-storey outshut. The windows are casements and there is an eyebrow dormer.	II
Dovey Brook Cottage; 52.39608°N 2.81827°W	—	17th or 18th century	A cottage that is timber framed with plaster infill, stone outer bays, and a thatched roof. It has two storeys and a T-shaped plan, with a front range and a rear wing. There is a gabled porch, and the windows are casements.	II
North Barn, Green Lane Farm; 52.40116°N 2.81719°W	—	Early 18th century (probable)	The barn was extended by the addition of a stable and a loft in the 19th century. The barn is timber framed with weatherboarding on a stone plinth, and has a tile roof. There is one storey and a loft at the east end and three bays. At the west end is a stone stable with one bay and a lower roof.	II
Onibury House; 52.40820°N 2.80346°W		18th century	The house was extended in the 19th century, and is in painted brick with a tile roof. There are two storeys, and the plan consists of a four-bay front entrance range, a rear four-bay garden wing, and a further wing at right angles to the garden wing. There are three gables on the garden front with moulded and scrolled bargeboards. On the front is a gabled porch, sash windows with moulded surrounds and casement windows with segmental heads. On the garden front are two canted bay windows and casement windows.	II
Sundial; 52.40769°N 2.80141°W		18th century	The sundial is outside the porch of St Michael's Church. It is in stone and consists of a vase-shaped pillar with a moulded base. On the top is a brass dial.	II
Wootton Farmhouse; 52.39995°N 2.79837°W	—	18th century (or earlier}	The farmhouse is rendered with a tile roof. It has two storeys and an attic, a front range of three bays and single-storey wings to the left and to the rear. On the front are two doorways, the windows are casements, and there are two gabled dormers. The gable end is timber framed.	II
Upper Walton Farmhouse; 52.41098°N 2.78569°W	—	Late 18th century	The farmhouse is in brick and stone, and has a tile roof. There are two storeys, and a T-shaped plan, with a three-bay front and a rear wing. The doorway has a fanlight, and the windows are casements.	II
Gazebo, Wootton Farm; 52.40090°N 2.79714°W	—	18th or 19th century (probable)	The gazebo is in brick on a stone basement, and has a square plan, and tiled pyramidal roof with a spike finial. It contains double doors and mullioned windows.	II
Onibury Farmhouse; 52.40726°N 2.80213°W	—	19th century	The farmhouse is in sandstone with a hipped Welsh slate roof. There are two storeys, a front range of three bays, a rear wing, and a wing to the left. The central doorway has a fanlight and a simple hood, above which is a cross-window, and the other windows are casements, most of which are mullioned and transomed.	II
Barn northwest of Onibury Farmhouse; 52.40763°N 2.80223°W	—	Mid- 19th century (or earlier)	The barn is in stone with some timber framing with weatherboarding in the upper storey, and it has a tile roof. The barn contains various entrances and openings.	II
Barn north-northwest of Onibury Farmhouse; 52.40776°N 2.80256°W	—	Mid- 19th century (or earlier)	The barn is partly in stone, and partly timber framed with weatherboarding, and has a tile roof. There is one storey and a loft, and it contains a doorway with a four-centred arched head, a loft opening, and three triangular ventilation holes.	II
Granary and store north of Onibury Farmhouse; 52.40735°N 2.80171°W	—	Mid- 19th century	The farm buildings are in sandstone and have hipped tile roofs. They contain various entrances and openings.	II
Ferney Hall, stables, wall and steps 52.39276°N 2.83198°W		1855–58	A country house designed by John Norton in Jacobean style, and reconstructed by Samuel Pountney Smith after a fire in 1875. It is in red brick with stone dressings, slate roofs, and has two storeys and attics. In the entrance front is a three-storey tower containing a doorway with Doric pilasters and a frieze, above which is a bracketed cornice, an open belvedere with a parapet, and an ogee roof. The garden front has five bays, two two-storey canted bay windows, shaped gables, and an oriel window over the doorway. Attached is a stable range with a carriage arch, a clock tower, and a lantern with an ogee roof. Also attached is a wall with niches, and steps and a gateway.	II
Ferney Lodge; 52.39504°N 2.82665°W		1856–60	The lodge at the entrance to the drive to Ferney Hall was designed by John Norton in Jacobean style. It is in red brick with stone dressings and has a slate roof. There are two storeys and two bays. The right bay has quoins, a canted bay window, and a shaped gable. In the left bay is a three-arched arcade with rusticated columns and arches, above which is a half-dormer and an ogee gable.	II
Onibury Station and platform rooms 52.40717°N 2.80392°W		Late 19th century	The station consists of a stationmaster's house and platform rooms to the right, later used for other purposes, and is in sandstone with a Welsh slate roof. The house has two storeys and contains a canted bay window with a cross-window above, and a gable with moulded and pierced bargeboards and a pendant finial. To the left is a lean-to porch that has a doorway with a fanlight and a pierced eaves-board. To the right is a single-storey wing with three cross-windows, a doorway with a chamfered lintel, and a gabled hood with moulded and pieced bargeboards, a pendant finial and a spike finial.	II
Stables, outbuildings and house, Stokesay Court; 52.40317°N 2.81556°W		1888	The buildings are in sandstone with tile roofs, and form a complex courtyard plan. The front range has two storeys, and there is one storey at the rear. The entrance range has a central archway, over which is a clock turret, and to the left is a shaped gable. The windows are casements, some with mullions and others also with transoms. The house has an open porch with an arcade and scrolled pilasters. At the rear is a glass-roofed portico.	II
Stokesay Court; 52.40283°N 2.81787°W		1889–95	A mansion in sandstone with a tile roof, it has two storeys and attics, and an E-shaped plan plus a wing to the rear on the right. The front has five bays, the central bay containing an ornate porch with attached Ionic columns, a moulded arch with keystones and a cornice. Above it is an oriel window with a moulded underhang, and over this is a shaped gable. In the outer bays are two-storey canted bay windows, over which are parapets with openwork balustrades and shaped gables. The windows are mullioned and transomed. At the rear is a bellcote and a tower with an embattled parapet.	II*
Bridge on drive, Stokesay Court; 52.40456°N 2.81129°W	—	c. 1889	The bridge on the drive to the mansion is in sandstone. It consists of three arches with keyblocks, pilasters, a moulded parapet, and pyramid finials.	II
Gates, piers, wing walls and screens, Stokesay Court; 52.40531°N 2.80585°W		c. 1890	The central carriageway gates, outer pedestrian gates, and openwork piers are in wrought iron. Flanking these are stone piers with moulded plinths, cartouches, bands, and moulded capitals with pyramid and ball finials. Outside these are curved wing walls and wrought iron screens with ball finials.	II
Lodge and wall, Stokesay Court; 52.40537°N 2.80602°W		1890	The lodge is in stone with a slate roof, and is in Jacobean style, with one storey. The front facing the road has an arch with a fluted keyblock to the left, and two windows to the right over which is a moulded cornice, a coped parapet, and a shaped gable with a ball finial. The front facing the drive has a double arched porch, a canted bay window, and a parapet with a similar gable. At the rear is a stone wall with coping.	II
War memorial 52.40766°N 2.80164°W		c. 1920	The war memorial is in the churchyard of St Michael's Church. It is limestone, partly rough-hewn, and partly ashlar. The memorial consists of a Celtic cross with a shaft and a strongly tapering base. On the front is a panel with an inscription and the names of those lost in the First World War, and on the base are the names of those lost in the Second World War.	II
Telephone kiosk 52.40819°N 2.80304°W		1935	A K6 type telephone kiosk, designed by Giles Gilbert Scott. Constructed in cast iron with a square plan and a dome, it has three unperforated crowns in the top panels.	II
