= Thomas Harris (architect) =

British architect

- Born: 1829/30; Britain
- Occupation: Architect
- Buildings: Stokesay Court; Milner Field

Thomas Harris (1829/30–1900) was a British architect.

== Work ==
Harris was born in 1829 or 1830, the son of William Harris, a baker, and his wife Charlotte. Nothing is known of his training or early career, but he was established in independent practice in London by 1851 and was elected a fellow of the Royal Institute of British Architects (RIBA) in that year. His works include Milner Field in Bingley (demolished), Bedstone Court and Stokesay Court in Shropshire and the remodelling of St Marylebone Parish Church in London.

Harris was described by Harry Stuart Goodhart-Rendel as one of a group of "those Gothic-Revival architects, addicted to Go, whose works were not marked by scholarship, serenity, or tact" for whose works he coined the term "Rogue Architecture". He wrote several works on architecture including the pamphlet Victorian Architecture (1860) in which he "had done nothing less than devise a term to describe a whole era".

== Selected publications ==
- Victorian Architecture: a few words to show that a national architecture adapted to the wants of the nineteenth century is attainable (1860, London: Bell and Daldy)
- Examples of the Architecture of the Victorian Age (edited and largely written by him) (1862)
- Three Periods of English Architecture (1894, London: B.T. Batsford)
- A historical and descriptive sketch of Marylebone Gardens. Collated from various sources by Thomas Harris (1887, London: Printed by the Chiswick Press for private circulation)
