= Cromie baronets =

Extinct baronetcy in the Baronetage of Ireland

The Cromie Baronetcy, of Stacombrie, was a title in the Baronetage of Ireland. It was created on 3 August 1776 for Michael Cromie, who represented Ballyshannon in the Irish House of Commons. The title became extinct on the death of the second Baronet in 1841.

== Cromie baronets, of Stacombrie (1776) ==
- Sir Michael Cromie, 1st Baronet (c. 1744–1824)
- Sir William Lambart Cromie, 2nd Baronet (c. 1780–1841)
