= John Folliott =

John Folliott, Folliot or Ffolliott may refer to:

- John Folliott (Ballyshannon MP) (1660–1697), Irish landowner and member of parliament for Ballyshannon
- John Folliot (British Army officer, died 1748), British general
- John Folliot (British Army officer, died 1762) (1691–1762), British general and member of parliament for Longford, Granard and Sligo, son of the Ballyshannon MP
- John Folliott (Donegal MP) (1696–1765), Irish landowner and member of parliament for Donegal and Kinsale, nephew of the Ballyshannon MP
- John Ffolliott (Conservative MP) (1798–1868), Irish landowner and member of parliament for Sligo, great-great-nephew of the above
