= Ferney Hall =

Historic house in Shropshire, England

Coordinates: 52.3931°N 2.8322°W

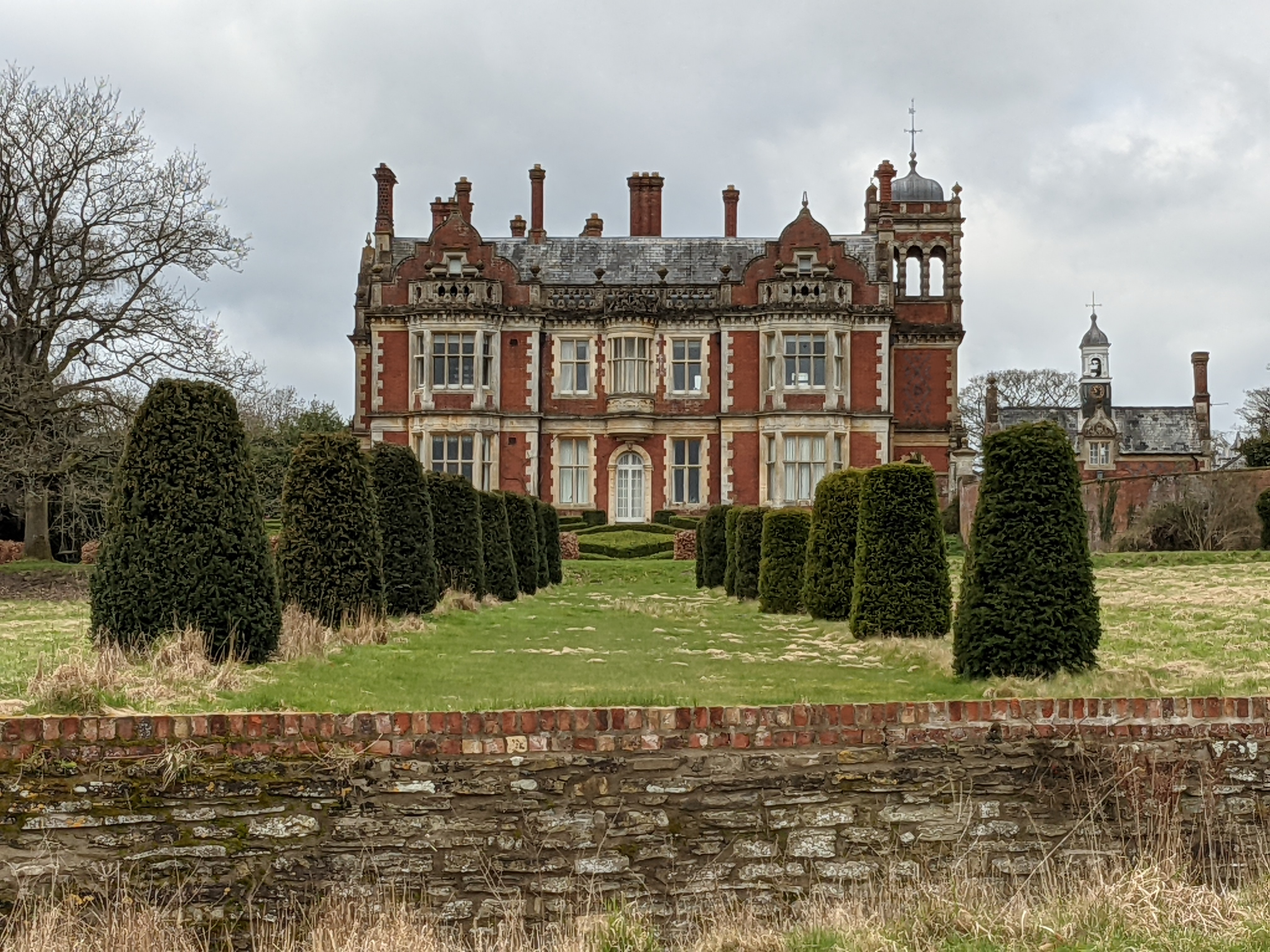
- Ferney Hall in Shropshire

General information
- Location: Onibury, Shropshire, England
- Completed: 1856 (rebuilt 1875)
- Client: William Willoughby George Hurt Sitwell
- Owner: Hugh Fitzwilliam-Lay

Design and construction
- Architect: Samuel Pountney Smith

Ferney Hall is a mid-Victorian-era mansion house situated at Onibury, Shropshire, England. It is a Grade II listed building. The hall is listed Grade II on the National Heritage List for England and its gardens are also Grade II listed on the Register of Historic Parks and Gardens.

The estate has had several owners, including, in the 16th century, the Norton family, and in the 17th century the Ffolliott family, followed by Walker in the 19th century.

Designs for new gardens at the old hall appeared in the 'Red Book' of Humphry Repton in 1789.

The present mansion was built on the site of the old hall in 1856 by William Willoughby George Hurt Sitwell, great nephew of Sir Sitwell Sitwell. Following a fire which severely damaged the structure, architect Samuel Pountney Smith supervised the rebuilding in 1875.

The property was occupied during the Second World War years by the R.A.S.C. and later housed Italian POWs and then German POW Owner. Mrs Cushney occupied some rooms throughout the war and until her death in about 1955-1956. The restoration of Ferney Hall was due for completion in early 2009, when its new owners were Mr and Mrs Wem. The restoration was being done by Mr William Wem and his son Dean Wem.

The house was sold later the same year for £1.55 million to Hugh Fitzwilliam-Lay.

The hall is not yet completed and is an ongoing project.

== See also ==
- Listed buildings in Onibury
