= József Teleki =

Hungarian jurist and historian

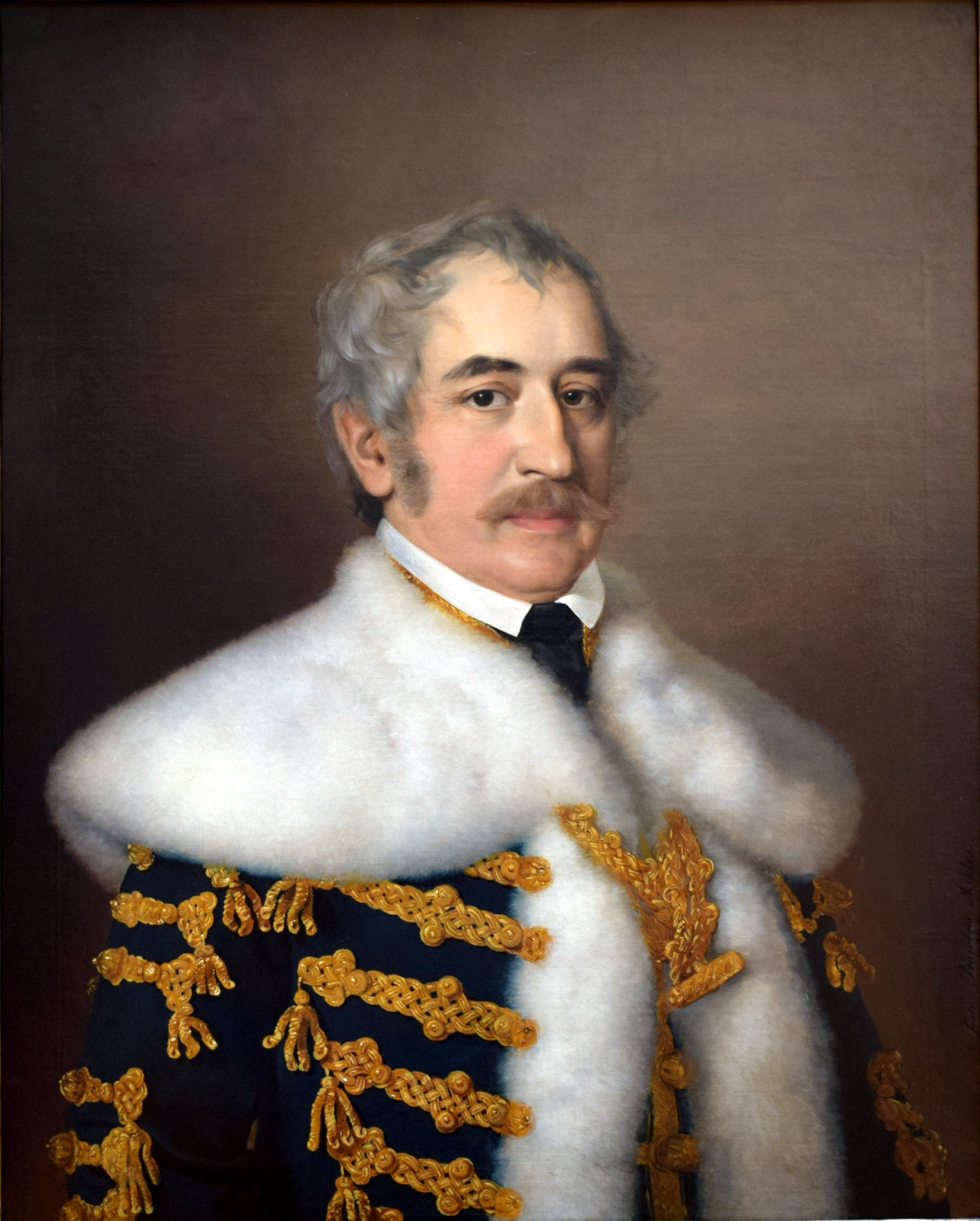

Governor of Transylvania
- In office 8 January 1842 – 14 November 1848
- Preceded by: János Kornis
- Succeeded by: Imre Mikó (as Chairman of the Gubernium)

Personal details
- Born: 24 October 1790; Pest, Kingdom of Hungary
- Died: 15 February 1855 (aged 64); Pest, Kingdom of Hungary
- Profession: historian, jurist

Count József Teleki de Szék (24 October 1790 – 15 February 1855) was a Hungarian jurist and historian, who served as the first President of the Hungarian Academy of Sciences from 1830 until his death.

He was born into an old noble Calvinist family. He functioned as Governor of Transylvania between 1842 and 1848.

== Ancestry ==
Ancestors of József Teleki

16. Teleki Sándor
8. Teleki László
17. Bethlen Júlia
4. Teleki József
18. Ráday Pál
9. Ráday Eszter
19. Kajali Klára
2. Teleki László
10. Róth Tamás
5. Róth Janka
11. Wattay Borbála
1. Teleki József
24. Teleki Pál
12. Teleki Ádám
25. Vay Katalin
6. Teleki Ádám
26. Thoroczkay Zsigmond
13. Thoroczkay Klára
27. Thoroczkay Klára
3. Teleki Mária
28. Wesselényi István
14. Wesselényi István
29. Bánffy Katalin
7. Wesselényi Mária
30. Dániel István
15. Dániel Polixéna
31. Pekry Polixéna

== Sources ==
- Szinnyei, József: Magyar írók élete és munkái XIII. (Steiner–Télfy). Budapest: Hornyánszky. 1909.
- Nagy Ferenc: Teleki József gróf. In: Nemzeti évfordulóink 2005. Bp.: Nemzeti Kulturális Örökség Minisztériuma, 2004

Cultural offices
Preceded by office created	President of the Hungarian Academy of Sciences; 1830–1855	Succeeded by Emil Dessewffy
