= Baron Folliott =

Title in the Peerage of Ireland

- Creation: 1620
- Peerage: Peerage of Ireland
- First holder: Henry Folliott, 1st Baron Folliott
- Last holder: Henry Folliott, 3rd Baron Folliott

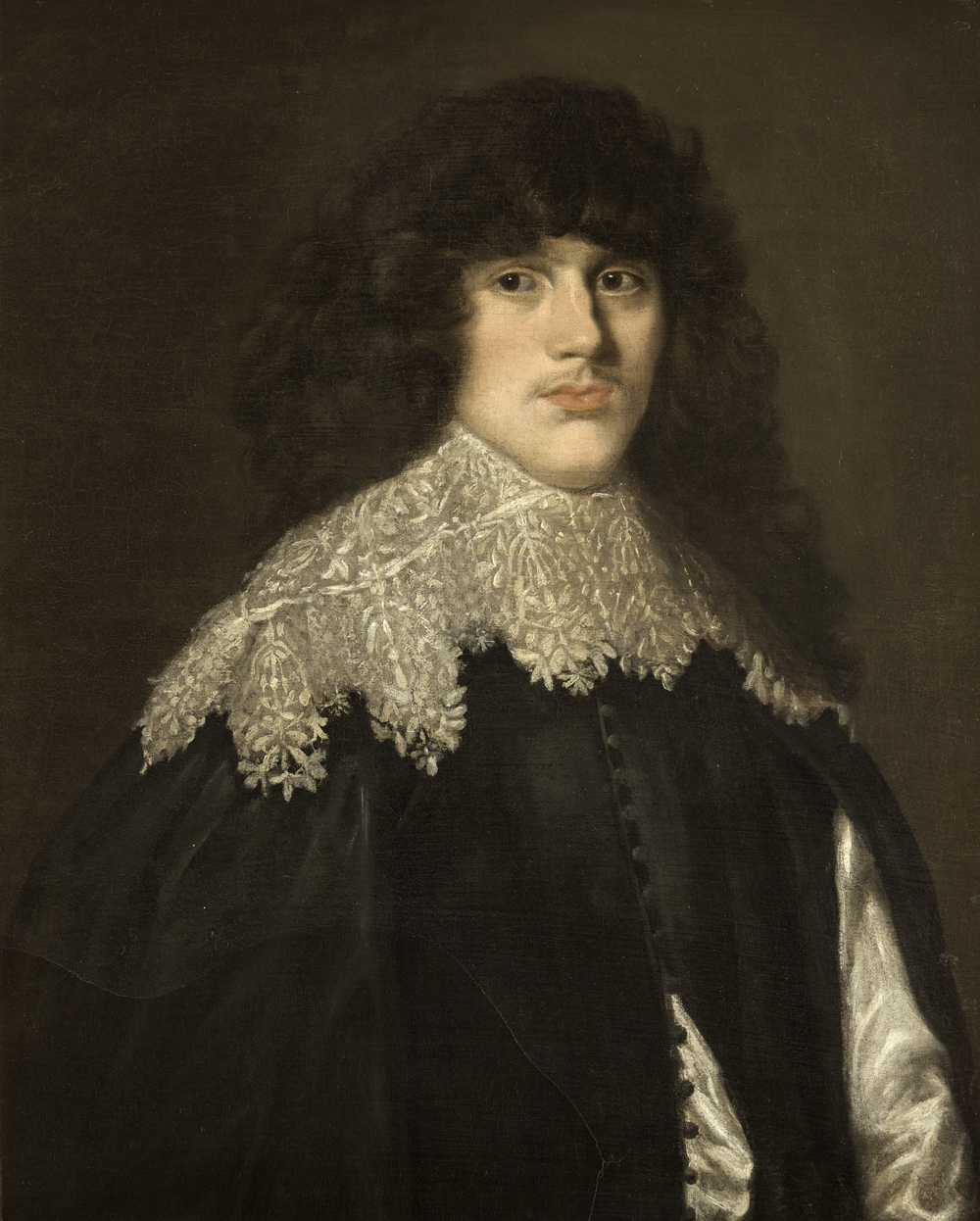
Thomas Folliott, 2nd Baron Folliott

Baron Folliott, of Ballyshannon in the County of Donegal, was a title in the Peerage of Ireland. It was created on 22 January 1620 for Henry Folliott. The Folliott family (also Folliot, Foliot, ffolliot, ffolliott, in origin a Norman name) held lands in Pirton, Worcestershire from the 14th century. The family seat until 1623 was Pirton Court, Pirton, Worcestershire, and later Blakesley Hall, Yardley (now Birmingham). The Irish branch of the family acquired substantial estates in County Donegal, Ireland, in the 17th century. The third Baron represented Ballyshannon in the Irish Parliament. The title became extinct on his death in 1716.

== Barons Folliott (1620) ==
- Henry Folliott, 1st Baron Folliott (1568–1622)
- Thomas Folliott, 2nd Baron Folliott (1613–1697)
- Henry Folliott, 3rd Baron Folliott (died 1716)
