= Pirton, Worcestershire =

Village in Worcestershire, England

Coordinates: 52.12478°N 2.17816°W

Pirton
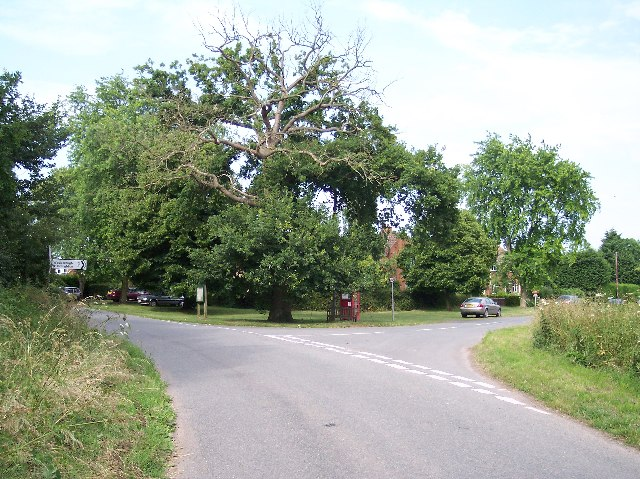
- Village Green complete with oak tree.

- Location within Worcestershire
- OS grid reference: SO879474
- District: Wychavon
- Shire county: Worcestershire
- Region: West Midlands
- Country: England
- Sovereign state: United Kingdom
- Post town: WORCESTER
- Postcode district: WR8
- Police: West Mercia
- Fire: Hereford and Worcester
- Ambulance: West Midlands

Pirton is a small village in the Wychavon district of Worcestershire, England. The village has been occupied since at least 1086, when Domesday listed the village of Peritone within the hundred of Pershore. The name Pirton derives from the Old English pirigetūn meaning 'settlement growing with pear trees'.

Pirton has some uncommon features for a village. The most unusual is an 18th-century folly named Pirton Tower near a lake named Pirton Pool. It is one of the remaining artifices which the Earl of Coventry built to add artistic interest to views from the park at his distant estate, Croome Court. Pirton Tower and some of the other follies became purposed as local picnic houses. The follies were allowed to fall into disrepair.

Pirton has a Council-owned wood, beside Pirton Green.

Pirton Church has a storied history. It is about half a mile away from "main" Pirton. When the Black Death arrived in Pirton c. 1357, it was tremendously harmful for the villagers. There is a ditch which was a mass grave for those who died because of the illness. The surviving residents had to move to the countryside at the time of the black death. The current Pirton Church is about 500 years old and has been in continuous use. It still conducts services on Sundays or e.g.: Mass.

Pirton has a nearby level crossing which used to be called Pirton Sidings due to the sidings that used to be there. Pirton Level Crossing is a highly filmed location for Rail Enthusiasts.
