= Jack Zipes =

American professor of German, comparative literature, and cultural studies (born 1937)

- Born: June 7, 1937 (age 89)
- Occupations: Literary scholar and author

Academic background
- Education: BA., Political Science; MA., English and Comparative Literature; PhD., English and Comparative Literature
- Alma mater: Dartmouth College; Columbia University

Jack David Zipes (born 7 June 1937) is a literary scholar and author. He is a professor emeritus in the Department of German, Nordic, Slavic and Dutch at the University of Minnesota.

Zipes is known for his work on fairy tales, folklore, critical theory, 20th-century literature, German literature, German Jewish culture and the political and cultural significance of the Brothers Grimm tales. He has authored, co-authored and edited 69 books including The Great Fairy Tale Tradition: From Straparola and Basile to the Brothers Grimm, Buried Treasures: The Power of Political Fairy Tales and Don't Bet on the Prince. Among his honors are the Guggenheim Fellowship (1988), the International Association for the Fantastic in the Arts Distinguished Scholar Award (1992), the National Endowment for the Humanities Fellowship (1998), the International Brothers Grimm Award from the International Institute for Children's Literature in Osaka, Japan (1999), the Folklore Society Katharine Briggs Award (2007), the Mythopoeic Scholarship Award (2012), the Chicago Folklore Prize (2015), and the World Fantasy Convention Award for Lifetime Achievement (2019).

Zipes is a Fellow of the American Folklore Society and the International Research Society for Children's Literature (IRSCL). He was a founding editor of the New German Critique, and holds positions on the advisory boards for the Oxford Research Encyclopedia of Literature, Fairy Tale Review and Storytelling, Self, Society.

== Education ==
Zipes earned a bachelor's degree in political science from Dartmouth College in 1959, followed by a master's degree in English and comparative literature from Columbia University in 1960. He went on to study at LMU Munich in 1962 and the University of Tübingen in 1963, receiving a PhD in comparative literature from Columbia University in 1965. His thesis was published as a book, The Great Refusal: Studies of the Romantic Hero in German and American Literature, in 1970 and was influenced by the works of Herbert Marcuse.

== Career ==
Zipes began his academic career as an instructor of American literature at LMU Munich from 1966 to 1967. He became an assistant professor at the New York University German Department in 1967, and later joined the University of Wisconsin–Milwaukee as an associate professor of German and comparative literature, staying there as full professor until 1986. From 1986 to 1989, he continued as a professor at the University of Florida Department of Germanic and Slavic Languages and Literatures before moving to the University of Minnesota, where he has been serving as a professor emeritus in the Department of German, Nordic, Slavic and Dutch since 2008. He was awarded honorary doctorates by the Anglia Ruskin University (2019), the University of Wisconsin–Milwaukee (2023), and the University of Winnipeg (2017).

Zipes assumed the position of the chair of the Department of German, Dutch, and Scandinavian from 1994 to 1998, later becoming the director of the Center for German and European Studies from 1998 to 2002 and has been the director of graduate studies since 1990.

Zipes was the co-founder of the Neighborhood Bridges literacy program, a joint project of the University of Minnesota and the Children's Theatre Company, in 1997 and directed it until 2008. In 2018, he established Little Mole and Honey Bear, a publishing house specializing in unique books for children and adults primarily created between 1910 and 1940.

== Works ==
Zipes has contributed to the field of literature by studying Jewish studies, German literature, children's literature, and the influence of fairy tales, with arguments based on the critical theory of the Frankfurt School.

=== Socio-political impact of fairy tales ===
Zipes has analyzed fairy tales to understand their importance in the modern world. Looking into the lasting impact of fairy tales on literature, he explored their evolution, socio-political context, and exploitation by media networks in the book Breaking the Magic Spell: Radical Theories of Folk & Fairy Tales, which was called "a stimulating contribution to the critical literature of folk and fairy tales" by Edith Lazaros Honig in Children's Literature Association Quarterly. He emphasized the genre's broader cultural significance in Why Fairy Tales Stick: The Evolution and Relevance of a Genre, suggesting that fairy tales, as culturally repeated memes, have evolved alongside humans' cognitive development, exhibiting polygenic traits that transcend geographical boundaries. Kimberley Reynolds commented in the Modern Language Review, "Why Fairy Tales Stick is both a welcome addition to the expanding area of books about fairy tales and a useful teaching resource."

Zipes compiled various stories in several works, including The Trials and Tribulations of Little Red Riding Hood: Versions of the Tale in Sociocultural Context and Beauties, Beasts, and Enchantment: Classic French Fairy Tales, presenting an account of lesser-known fairy tale versions and their contemporary relevance. He is also the Editor of the book series Oddly Modern Fairy Tales with Princeton University Press, comprising unusual literary fairy tales. Additionally, he published Fairy Tales and the Art of Subversion, which Deborah Stevenson referred to as "one of the key works of fairy-tale scholarship in our time", examining how fairy tales, through traditional forms and genres, have been used to shape children's behavior, values, and societal roles.

Zipes researched the lives and works of the Brothers Grimm in detail, by translating and publishing books like The Brothers Grimm: From Enchanted Forests to the Modern World and Grimm Legacies: The Magic Spell of the Grimms' Folk and Fairy Tales, revealing their personal struggles, political endeavors, and contributions to establishing fairy tales as a significant literary form. He translated the complete 1857 edition of fairy tales of the Brothers Grimm in 1987, and in 2014, he published the first edition of 1812 and 1815 as The Original Folk and Fairy Tales of the Brothers Grimm along with a new study of the tales, Grimm Legacies: The Magic Power of the Grimms' Folk and Fairy Tales. Furthermore, he delved into forgotten political fairy tales and profiles writers like Édouard Laboulaye and illustrators who addressed social and economic issues in Buried Treasures: The Power of Political Fairy Tales. In Publishers Weekly, the publication was regarded as "a potent testament to the power of stories."

=== German Jewish studies ===
Zipes' work on German Jewish studies focused on the relationship between German literature and Jewish culture. His book entitled Yale Companion to Jewish Writing and Thought in German Culture, 1096-1996, provided a chronological history of Jewish writing and thought in German-speaking lands, showcasing the influence of Jewish writers on German culture. In a review for the Journal of European Studies, Joachim Whaley stated "Gilman and Zipes have produced a marvellous compendium. Scholars will wish to return to it repeatedly."

In 1992, Zipes published The Operated Jew: Two Tales of Anti-Semitism, a translation of the stories "The Operated Jew" by Oskar Panizza and "The Operated Goy" by Mynona, investigating the themes of anti-Semitism and the pursuit of purity and perfection in turn-of-the-century Germany. In addition, he co-edited Unlikely History: The Changing German-Jewish Symbiosis,1945-2000 with Leslie Morris, assessing Jewish life in postwar Germany, including community, culture, and the resurgence of anti-Semitism in Austria, offering insights into the evolving relationship between Jews and Germans. About it, Bjorn Krondofer remarked "The co-editors Morris and Zipes have gathered an impressive list of contributors from different academic disciplines in the United States and Germany...".

== Awards and honors ==
- 1981 – Fulbright Scholarship
- 1988 – Fellowship, John Simon Guggenheim Foundation
- 1992 – Distinguished Scholar Award, International Association for the Fantastic in the Arts
- 1998 – Fellowship, National Endowment for the Humanities
- 1999 – International Brothers Grimm Award, International Institute for Children's Literature in Osaka, Japan
- 2000 – McKnight Research Grant
- 2007 – Katharine Briggs Award, Folklore Society
- 2012 – Mythopoeic Scholarship Award, The Mythopoeic Society
- 2015 – Chicago Folklore Prize, American Folklore Society
- 2019 – Award for Lifetime Achievement, World Fantasy Convention

== Bibliography ==
=== Selected authored books ===
- The Great Refusal: Studies of the Romantic Hero in German and American Literature (1970) ISBN 978-3891044001
- Breaking the Magic Spell: Radical Theories of Folk & Fairy Tales (1979) ISBN 978-0813190303
- Fairy Tales and the Art of Subversion: The Classical Genre for Children and the Process of Civilization (1983) ISBN 978-0415905138
- The Operated Jew: Two Tales of Antisemitism (1991) ISBN 978-0415904605
- Happily Ever After: Fairy Tales, Children and the Culture Industry (1997) ISBN 978-0415918510
- The Brothers Grimm: From Enchanted Forests to the Modern World (2002) ISBN 978-1596932128
- Why Fairy Tales Stick: The Evolution and Relevance of a Genre (2007) ISBN 978-0415977814
- The Irresistible Fairy Tale: The Cultural and Social History of a Genre (2012) ISBN 978-0691159553
- Grimm Legacies: The Magic Spell of the Grimms’ Folk and Fairy Tales (2014) ISBN 978-0691173672
- Buried Treasures: The Power of Political Fairy Tales (2023) ISBN 978-0691244730

=== Selected edited books ===
- Don’t Bet on the Prince: Contemporary Feminist Fairy Tales in North America and England (1986) ISBN 978-0415902632
- Beauties, Beasts, and Enchantment: Classic French Fairy Tales (1989) ISBN 978-0453006934
- The Trials and Tribulations of Little Red Riding Hood: Versions of the Tale in Sociocultural Context (1993) ISBN 978-0415908351
- Yale Companion to Jewish Writing and Thought in German Culture, 1096-1996 (1997) ISBN 978-0300068245
- The Great Fairy Tale Tradition: From Straparola and Basile to the Brothers Grimm (2000) ISBN 978-0393976366
- The Oxford Companion to Fairy Tales (2000) ISBN 978-0198605096
- Unlikely History: The Changing German-Jewish Symbiosis, 1945-2000 (2002) ISBN 978-0312293901
- The Original Folk and Fairy Tales of the Brothers Grimm: The Complete First Edition (2014) ISBN 978-0691173221
