= Frances Brody =

English novelist

Frances McNeil, also writing as Frances Brody, is an English novelist and playwright, and has written extensively for radio.

== Early life ==
McNeil was born in Leeds, West Yorkshire, where she now lives. She studied at Ruskin College, Oxford and has a degree in English literature and History from the University of York.

== Writing ==
As Frances Brody she has written a series of 1920s crime novels featuring Kate Shackleton. The sixth in the series, An Avid Reader, is set in the Leeds Library, the oldest surviving subscription library of its type in the UK. After nine books in the series Brody wrote a short story prequel, Kate Shackleton's First Case, in which the story begins in a Harrogate teashop. The twelfth book in the series (excluding "first case") was Death and the Brewery Queen, published in 2020, and the thirteenth, A Mansion for Murder, in 2022. Each book in the series is set in a specific location in Yorkshire. A Woman Unknown was shortlisted for the 2016 Simon & Schuster Mary Higgins Clark Award, the criteria for which include: "the protagonist is a nice young woman whose life is suddenly invaded".

In 2021 Brody published A Murder Inside, the first in the Brackerley Prison Mysteries series set in a 1960s women's prison in Yorkshire.

She wrote three novels under her own name, which were republished in 2016 under the name Frances Brody. Sisters on Bread Street is partly based on the story of her mother, who lived on Bread Street in Leeds as a child; it was published in a limited edition just after her mother's hundredth birthday, published in an expanded edition as Somewhere Behind the Morning, and republished in 2016 under its original title. Sixpence in her Shoe relates to the Leeds Children's Holiday Camp Association based at Silverdale, Lancashire, about which she has also written a factual history, Now I am a Swimmer (the title being a quote from a child's letter home). Sisters of Fortune is the tale of two girls of different financial backgrounds growing up in Leeds, and was republished as Halfpenny Dreams.

Her plays include Tressell, about Robert Tressell, author of The Ragged-Trousered Philanthropists.

== Recognition ==
Brody's book A Woman Unknown was shortlisted for the 2016 Simon & Schuster Mary Higgins Clark Award, the criteria for which include: "the protagonist is a nice young woman whose life is suddenly invaded".

Brody's name is one of those featured on the sculpture Ribbons, unveiled in 2024.

An archive of her literary papers is held by the University of Leeds.

== Selected publications ==
=== Writing as Frances McNeil ===
- Sisters on Bread Street (Limited edition, 2003, Pavan Press, ISBN 9780952554714; published as Somewhere Behind the Morning 2006, Orion Books, ISBN 978-1407223971; republished January 2016 as Sisters on Bread Street, a Frances Brody book, Piatkus, ISBN 978-0-3494-1070-8)
- Sixpence in her Shoe (2007, Orion Books, ISBN 978-0752881645; republished April 2016 as a Frances Brody book, Piatkus, ISBN 978-0-3494-1071-5)
- Sisters of Fortune (2007, Severn House, ISBN 978-0727865847; republished July 2016 as Halfpenny Dreams, a Frances Brody book, Piatkus, ISBN 978-0-3494-1073-9)
- Now I am a Swimmer (2004, Pavan Press, ISBN 978-0952554721) (Non-fiction account of the Leeds Children's Holiday Camp Association)

=== Writing as Frances Brody – the Kate Shackleton books ===
- Dying in the Wool (2009, Piatkus, ISBN 978-0-7499-4187-1) Set in the fictional village of Bridgestead, based on Cottingley
- A Medal for Murder (2010, Piatkus, ISBN 978-0-7499-4192-5) Set in Harrogate
- Murder in the Afternoon (2011, Piatkus, ISBN 978-0-7499-5482-6) Set in the fictional quarry village of Great Applewick in the Yorkshire Dales
- A Woman Unknown (2012, Piatkus, ISBN 978-0-7499-5492-5) Set in Leeds
- Murder on a Summer's Day (2013, Piatkus, ISBN 978-0-3494-0058-7) Set at Bolton Abbey
- Death of an Avid Reader (2014, Piatkus, ISBN 978-0-3494-0057-0) Set at the Leeds Library
- A Death in the Dales (2015, Piatkus, ISBN 978-0-3494-0656-5) Set in the Yorkshire Dales around Langcliffe
- Death at the Seaside (2016, Piatkus, ISBN 978-0349406589) Set in Whitby
- Death in the Stars (2017, Piatkus, ISBN 978-0349414317) Set at Giggleswick School at the time of the Solar eclipse of June 29, 1927
- Kate Shackleton's First Case (2018, ebook, Little, Brown, ISBN 9780349421155) Set in Harrogate
- A Snapshot of Murder (2018, Piatkus, ISBN 978-0-3494-1432-4) Includes the short story Kate Shackleton's First Case; set at Ponden Hall
- The Body on the Train (2019, Piatkus, ISBN 9780349423074) Set in the Rhubarb Triangle featuring the early-morning train to King's Cross
- Death and the Brewery Queen (2020, Piatkus, ISBN 978-0-3494-2308-1), published in United States as Murder is in the Air (2020, Crooked Lane, ISBN 978-0-3494-2308-1) Set in Masham, home to Theakston Brewery and Black Sheep Brewery
- A Mansion for Murder (2022, Piatkus, ISBN 978-0-3494-3197-0) Set at Milner Field (now demolished) near Saltaire

=== Writing as Frances Brody – the Brackerley Prison Mysteries ===
- A Murder Inside (2021, Piatkus, ISBN 9780349423111)
- Six Motives for Murder (9 May 2024, Piatkus, ISBN 978-0-3494-3199-4)
