= Sir Michael Cromie, 1st Baronet =

Anglo-Irish politician (1744–1824)

Sir Michael Cromie, 1st Baronet (circa 1744 – 14 May 1824) was an Anglo-Irish politician.

Cromie was the Member of Parliament for Ballyshannon in the Irish House of Commons between 1776 and 1797. On 3 August 1776 he was created a baronet, of Stacombrie in the Baronetage of Ireland. He was succeeded in his title by his son, William.

Parliament of Ireland
Preceded by Michael Clarke; William Gamble	Member of Parliament for Ballyshannon; 1776-1797; With: John Staples (1776-1783); William Ogilvie (1783-1790); Thomas Dickson (1790-1797)	Succeeded by Viscount Corry; David Babington
Baronetage of Ireland
New creation	Baronet (of Stacombrie); 1776-1824	Succeeded by William Cromie
