= Onibury railway station =

Former railway station in England

Onibury
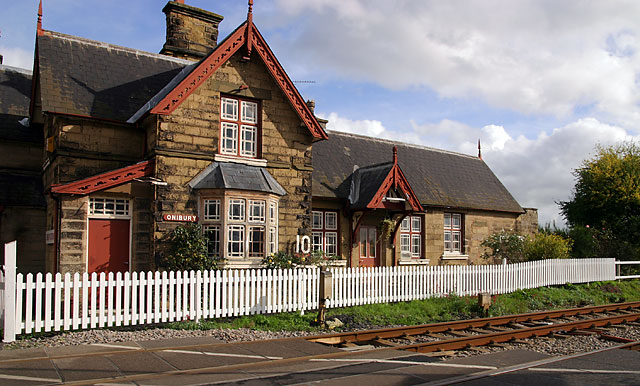
- The former station building

General information
- Location: Onibury, Shropshire; England
- Coordinates: 52.4074°N 2.8047°W
- Grid reference: SO453791

Other information
- Status: Disused

History
- Original company: Shrewsbury and Hereford Railway
- Pre-grouping: LNWR and GWR joint
- Post-grouping: LMS and GWR joint

Key dates
- 21 April 1852: Opened
- 9 June 1958: Closed
Location

Onibury railway station was a station in Onibury, Shropshire, England. The station was opened in 1852 and closed in 1958.

== See also ==
- Listed buildings in Onibury

Preceding station	Disused railways	Following station
Craven Arms; Line and station open	LNWR and GWR joint Shrewsbury and Hereford Railway	Bromfield; Line open, station closed
