= Hermynia Zur Mühlen =

Austrian writer and translator

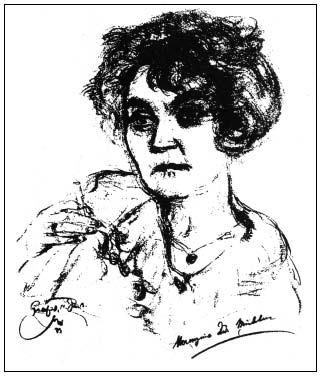
Hermynia Zur Mühlen (late 1920s) drawn by Emil Stumpp

Hermynia Zur Mühlen (12 December 1883 – 20 March 1951), or Folliot de Crenneville-Poutet, was an Austrian writer and translator. She translated over seventy books into German from English, Russian and French, including work by Upton Sinclair, John Galsworthy, Jerome K. Jerome, Harold Nicolson, Max Eastman and Edna Ferber. She has been characterised as "one of the best known women writers of the Weimar Republic." A committed socialist from a Viennese aristocratic Catholic family, she was sometimes called the Red Countess.

== Life ==
The Countess Folliot de Crenneville, born as Hermine Isabelle Maria Gräfin Folliot de Crenneville in Vienna, was the great-granddaughter of Louis Charles Folliot de Crenneville, a French-born general who fought for the Habsburg monarchy in the Napoleonic Wars. Her paternal grandfather was Franz Folliot de Crenneville, Knight in the Order of the Golden Fleece. She was also a great-great-granddaughter of Victoire de Folliot de Crenneville, the royal governess of Marie Louise, Empress of the French. Her maternal grandfather was the diplomat Ferdinand, Count von Wydenbruck, who had married a politically liberal woman from the Anglo-Irish gentry. Growing up in the Governorate of Estonia, where her father was a diplomat, she was sent aged 30 to a pulmonary sanatorium in Davos. Here she began a career of translation into German, translating an anti-war novel by Leonid Andreyev, and in 1918 King Coal by Upton Sinclair. An unhappy marriage to Viktor von zur Mühlen, a conservative German landowner, was officially ended in 1923. By this time, she had met Stefan Klein, a German Jew and fellow translator who would be her partner for the rest of her life.

Zur Mühlen wrote six detective novels under the name Lawrence H. Desberry, and collections of fairy tales interpreted from a radical perspective. She also wrote anecdotes, sketches, and feuilletons for periodical publication. She published an autobiographical memoir, End und Anfang, in 1929, in which the new beginning is that of the Russian Revolution. Though she quietly left the Communist Party around 1931 or 1932, she remained committed to socialism.

Zur Mühlen and Klein left Germany for Vienna in 1933. Zur Mühlen refused to agree to S. Fischer Verlag's appeal that she follow Thomas Mann, Alfred Döblin, René Schickele and Stefan Klein in undertaking not to write in émigré magazines:

To this 'best of company; I prefer solidarity with those who, in the Third Reich, are persecuted because of their convictions, shut up in concentration camps, or 'shot while attempting to escape.' One cannot serve Germany and the German people better than by joining in the struggle against the horror tale become reality that is the Third Reich.

Unsere Töchter die Nazinen was a directly anti-Nazi satire: serialized in the Territory of the Saar Basin in a leftwing newspaper in 1934, It was banned after eventually finding a publisher in 1936. With the Anschluss of 1938, Zur Mühlen and Klein left for Bratislava, where they married. After the German occupation of Bohemia in March 1939, they had to escape again; via Budapest, Yugoslavia, Italy, Switzerland, and France, they reached London on 19 June 1939. In London, Zur Mühlen scraped a precarious living from journalism. The two novels she wrote in England - Ewiges Schattenspiel and Als der Fremde kam - seem to have been part of an intended trilogy. She died in obscurity in Radlett, Hertfordshire.

== Works ==
- Schupomann Karl Müller (1924)
- Fairy tales for workers' children Chicago, Ill., Daily Worker Pub. Co. 1925
- Unsere Töchter, die Nazinnen Our Daughters, the Nazis (1935). "Unsere Töchter die Nazinen." A Synopsis in English, With an Introduction. By Lionel Gossman, Princeton University.
- We Poor Shadows (1943)
- Came the Stranger (1946)
- The Castle of Truth and Other Revolutionary Tales (Princeton, 2020), ed. and trans. by Jack Zipes

== Sources ==
- Bloomsbury Guide to Women's Literature
- Lionel Gossman, "The Red Countess: Four Stories," Common Knowledge, vol. 15 (2009), 59-91.
- Ailsa Wallace, Hermynia Zur Muhlen: The Guises of Socialist Fiction (Oxford University Press, 2009)
- Manfred Altner, Hermynia Zur Muhlen; Eine Biographie, (Bern: Peter Lang, 1997)
- Barbara McCloskey, "Teach Your Children Well: Hermynia Zur Mühlen, George Grosz, and the Art of Radical Pedagogy in Germany between the World Wars." In Art and Resistance in Germany, edited by Deborah Ascher Barnstone and Elizabeth Otto. (New York: Bloomsbury Visual Arts, 2018), p. 77-95.
