= Governor of Transylvania =

The governor of Transylvania was a viceroy representing the Habsburg monarchs in the Principality (from 1765 Grand Principality) of Transylvania between 1691 and 1867.

== List of governors ==
=== Seventeenth century ===
| Term | Incumbent | Monarch | Notes | Source |
|---|---|---|---|---|
| 1691–1708 | Count György Bánffy | Leopold I Joseph I | | |

=== Eighteenth century ===
| Term | Incumbent | Monarch | Notes | Source |
|---|---|---|---|---|
| 1709–1710 | Baron István Haller | Joseph I | | |
| 1710–1713 | Count István Wesselényi | Joseph I Charles VI | | |
| 1713–1731 | Count Zsigmond Kornis | Charles VI | | |
| 1731–1732 | Count István Wesselényi | Charles VI | | |
| 1732–1734 | Count Francis Paul Anthony Wallis | Charles VI | | |
| 1734–1755 | Count János Haller | Charles VI; Maria Theresa | | |
| 1755–1758 | Count Frances Wenceslaus Wallis | Maria Theresa | | |
| 1762–1763 | Adolf Nikolaus von Buccow | Maria Theresa | | |
| 1764–1767 or 1768 | Count András Hadik | Maria Theresa | | |
| 1767 or 1768–1770 | Karl O'Donnell | Maria Theresa | | |
| 1771–1773 or 1774 | Joseph Auersperg | Maria Theresa | | |
| 1774 or 1777–1787 | Baron Samuel von Brukenthal | Maria Theresa | | |
| 1787–1822 | Count György Bánffy | Maria Theresa; Joseph II; Leopold II; Francis II/I | | |

=== Nineteenth century ===
| Term | Incumbent | Monarch | Notes | Source |
|---|---|---|---|---|
| 1822–1834 | Baron János Jósika | Francis I | | |
| 1835–1837 | Archduke Ferdinand Karl Joseph of Austria-Este | Ferdinand I | | |
| 1838–1840 | Count János Kornis | Ferdinand I | | |
| 1842–1848 | Count József Teleki | Ferdinand I | | |
| 1848 | Count Imre Mikó | Ferdinand I Francis Joseph I | first rule | |
| 1849 | Karl Knezich | Lajos Kossuth | Appointed by Lajos Kossuth; never took office de jure or de facto due to the imminent collapse of the military front. He remained in active military command until the surrender at Világos. | |
| 1849–1851 | Ludwig von Wohlgemuth | Francis Joseph I | | |
| 1851–1858 | Karl von Schwarzenberg | Francis Joseph I | | |
| 1858–1861 | Friedrich von Liechtenstein | Francis Joseph I | | |
| 1860–1861 | Count Imre Mikó | Francis Joseph I | | |
| 1861–1867 | Ludwig Folliot de Crenneville | Francis Joseph I | | |

== See also ==
- List of rulers of Transylvania
- List of chancellors of Transylvania
- Voivode of Transylvania
