= Milner Field =

Demolished country house in West Yorkshire, England

Coordinates: 53.8455°N 1.8147°W

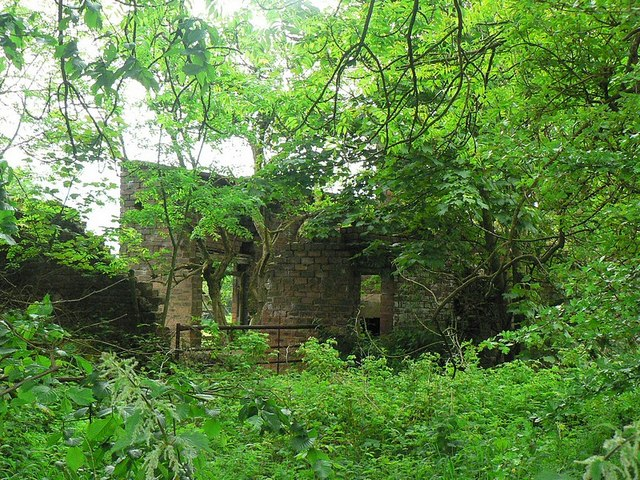
Remains of a building, possibly a greenhouse, at Milner Field in 2009

Milner Field was a large country house near Saltaire, West Yorkshire, England built in 1872 and demolished in the 1950s. It was built for Titus Salt Jr, youngest son of the Yorkshire wool merchant and philanthropist Sir Titus Salt. The house was situated at the edge of Gilstead, near Bingley, and overlooked the Aire Valley in the direction of Sir Titus Salt's model village of Saltaire and Salts Mill.

== The Salt years ==
Titus Salt Jr purchased an existing Elizabethan manor house named Milner Field and surrounding land c. 1870. The original house was demolished and rebuilt, though the original entrance steps and gateway were retained to form an entrance to the new croquet lawn. Salt employed Thomas Harris, a Victorian architect, to design and build the new house. London landscape gardener Robert Marnock was hired, and the house and grounds were completed in 1872, when Titus Salt Jr moved in with his family, including his wife Catherine.

== Royal visits and Salt's death ==
After the death of Sir Titus Salt in 1876, the Salt family's fortunes began to suffer. A major business venture in Dayton, Tennessee, USA, resulted from a loan by Sir Titus Salt to his friend, Alfred Allott, to enable him to purchase a large piece of land in Dayton with significant coal and iron deposits. The debt could not be repaid, so the land came into the ownership of Sir Titus Salt (Bart) Sons and Company Ltd. in 1876. After visiting Dayton and receiving reports of significant mineral deposits, the company invested in the production of coal and iron, building blast furnaces and a small town for workers. The venture led to a severe cash flow problem for the Salt family business, forcing it into administration in 1893.

During this time, they were still considered influential and well-connected socially. There were two royal visits to the house in 1882 and 1887. The Prince of Wales and his consort attended a dinner at the house in 1882 when the Prince was in Bradford to open the new technical school. In 1887, the youngest daughter of Queen Victoria, Princess Beatrice, stayed at Milner Field with her consort, and officially opened the Yorkshire Royal Jubilee Exhibition at Saltaire.

Titus Salt Jr announced in 1886 that he planned an exhibition in Saltaire to offset the costs of a new building erected in honour of his father. The new building would provide art and science education. Plans proceeded for a Yorkshire Royal Jubilee Exhibition. Titus Salt Jr was aware of the great success of the 1851 Royal Exhibition at Crystal Palace and hoped that similar numbers would be attracted. He faced competition from similar exhibitions in Manchester and Newcastle in the North of England, and few knew of Saltaire. The exhibition ran for five months, but as a consequence of the competition, the numbers attending the Yorkshire Royal Jubilee Exhibition were not enough to cover the costs of the new Exhibition Building, and left a debt of £12,000 for the Salts Schools. The day that Titus Salt Jr was to meet the Salt School governors to discuss the debt, he felt ill and left the mill for his home. Known to have a pre-existing heart condition, he collapsed and died at the age of 44.

== The Roberts years ==
Catherine continued to live at the house c. 1900, but eventually sold it to the wealthy Roberts family due to mounting debts, who later bequeathed Roberts Park to Saltaire. When Sir James Roberts was made a baronet, he chose the title "of Milner Field". He purchased Milner Field in 1903 from Catherine Salt. The Roberts residence ended in 1918, and the mansion was purchased by Salts (Saltaire) Ltd. in 1923 to be used as a residence for one of the firm's directors, Ernest Gates. Gates was one of a number of manufacturers who made personal wealth from the growing West Yorkshire textile trade. One of the daughters of Sir James Roberts was involved in a scandal and brought national press interest to proceedings in the Roberts Family.

== The Gates years ==
When the Roberts family left, Ernest H Gates (1874–1925), a director of Salts (Saltaire) Ltd., became the next owner of Milner Field with his wife in 1923. They had a son born in 1903, Ernest Everard Gates, who was educated at Cambridge University and became a Conservative member of parliament from 1940 to 1951. Ernest Everard Gates did not become involved in the textile industry or Saltaire.

Ernest H Gates ensured that a man he consiered highly competent and knowledgeable, who had worked for him for 20 years, was well-positioned in Salts (Saltaire) Ltd. by 1925. Robert Whyte Guild, originally Gates' Scottish agent, managed Salts Mill from the 1930s to the early 1960s.

Within six weeks of moving into Milner Field, Ernest H Gates lost his wife, and he later died by a scratch from a rosebush on the estate (or a blow to the leg from a golf club according to other sources) two years later at the age of 51.

== The Hollins years ==
The Gates family were followed by the Hollins. Arthur Hollins was also a director of Salts (Saltaire) Ltd. and died from hiccups by 1926. The Hollins family were the final inhabitants of Milner Field. An auction was organised, but the house went unsold, due to superstition surrounding the frequency of the previous owners' unusual deaths.

== Final years ==
Another auction, arranged for 1930, again failed to result in a sale. With the house now owned by the Salts Mill estate, the roof was removed to avoid paying rates (local taxes). The building deteriorated in the years leading up to the Second World War, and was plundered by the mill for stone for repairs, and by locals. The estate was billeted by the Home Guard (Bingley) who used the building for grenade practice.

After the Second World War, the house became a playground for local children, but the dangerous state of the place led to the decision to demolish it. In the 1950s, an attempted explosion failed due to the structural quality of the original build. While a fire is said to have taken place, it is unknown whether it was an isolated incident or was designed to strip the house of remaining timber prior to a second explosion attempt. The second attempt with dynamite was a partial success, and the remaining tall walls and towers were pulled down with rope and chain, and left where they fell.

The site was plundered for years for stone and brick, except for the large pieces that were far too heavy to move. Cellars remained intact, and became a new playground for local children.

== Recent times ==
The coach road that existed between the South (originally Eastern) and North (originally Western) lodges became open land. The lodges – originally gatehouses to the estate – became inhabited again. The original gothic archway fell in the 1970s. Children used the site for mountain biking, social drinking and vandalism.

== Present day ==
Interest in the site was renewed partly by the links to the World Heritage Site at Saltaire, but also due to the book The Lost Country House of Titus Salt Junior by Richard Lee-Van den Daele and R. David Beale. In 2022, an group of locals started to safely uncover parts of the perimeter of the building that remains. The conservatory floor was swept, and original features of the building have been uncovered. The group's aim was to expose as much of the outline of the remains as possible, to give an idea of the shape and scale of the house, the conservatory, the terraces, the kitchens and servant's quarters. Concern about the volunteers' work has been expressed by a local history group.

== In literature ==
Frances Brody's 2022 novel A Mansion for Murder (Piatkus, ISBN 978-0-349-43197-0), the 13th in her Kate Shackleton series, is set in and around Milner Field in 1930.
