= Bob Cromie =

Australian rules footballer

Personal information
- Full name: Robert Lendrum Cromie
- Born: 14 August 1881; Swanwater, Victoria
- Died: 30 January 1962 (aged 80); Melbourne, Victoria
- Original team: North Fremantle / Brighton

Playing career^{1}
Years	Club	Games (Goals)
1908	St Kilda	1 (0)
- ^{1} Playing statistics correct to the end of 1908.

Robert Lendrum Cromie (14 August 1881 – 30 January 1962) was an Australian rules footballer who played with St Kilda in the Victorian Football League (VFL).
