= Onibury =

Village in Shropshire, England

Coordinates: 52.407°N 2.803°W

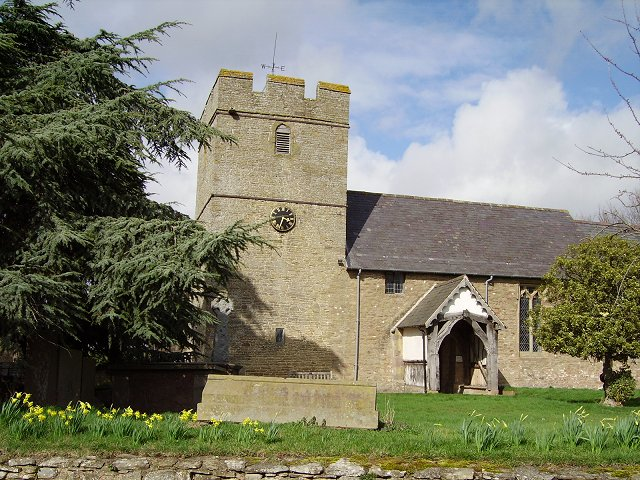
- St. Michael and All Angels parish church

- Location within Shropshire
- Population: 297 (2011 census)
- OS grid reference: SO453791
- Civil parish: Onibury
- Unitary authority: Shropshire
- Ceremonial county: Shropshire
- Region: West Midlands
- Country: England
- Sovereign state: United Kingdom
- Post town: Ludlow
- Postcode district: SY7
- Dialling code: 01584
- Police: West Mercia
- Fire: Shropshire
- Ambulance: West Midlands
- UK Parliament: Ludlow

Onibury is a village and civil parish on the River Onny in southern Shropshire, about 4 miles (6.4 km) northwest of the market town of Ludlow.

The parish includes the hamlets of Walton and Wootton and was extended in 1967 to include parts from Clungunford and Stokesay. It borders the parishes of Clungunford, Stokesay (now part of Craven Arms parish), Bromfield, Culmington and Stanton Lacy. The country houses of Ferney Hall and Stokesay Court are in the parish.

== History ==
=== Toponym ===
The toponym "Onibury" is derived from the Old English for "fortified place on the River Onny". "Onny" means "river on whose banks ash trees grew", from the Welsh "on" meaning ashes.

=== Domesday Book ===
Onibury is recorded in the Domesday Book of 1086 as Aneberie. It had 15 households, making it a fairly medium-sized settlement for the time, and a priest. The manor formed part of the Saxon hundred of Culvestan.

=== Hundred ===
Onibury came to be in the lower division of the hundred of Munslow, following the amalgamation of Culvestan and Patton hundreds in the reign of Henry I (1100–1139).

== Parish church ==
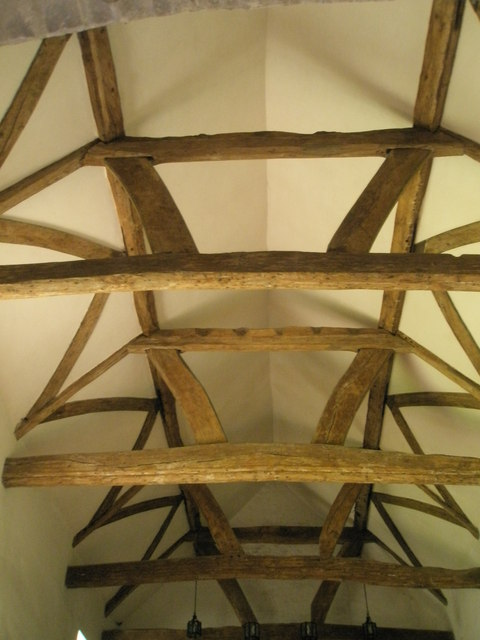
Queen post roof of St. Michael's nave

The Church of England parish church of Saint Michael & All Angels has a Norman (or possibly Saxon) chancel arch but much of the present building dates from the 14th century. The nave has a queen post roof, box pews and a west gallery. Lancet windows illuminate the 12th-century chancel, which features a walled-up priest's door. The 16th-century pulpit, late perpendicular with Jacobean additions, has linenfold panelling. St. Michael's has several 17th-century monuments. St. Michael's was restored under the direction of the Arts and Crafts architect Detmar Blow (1867–1939). The church is a Grade II* listed building.

The tower has a ring of four bells. John of Gloucester cast the second and third bells in about 1350. Henry Clibury of Wellington cast the tenor bell in 1676 and John Rudhall of Gloucester cast the treble bell in 1824. For technical reasons the bells are currently unringable.

In the churchyard is the parish's war memorial, initially erected after World War I, to the dead of both World Wars in the form of a stone cross.

St. Michael's is one of 17 churches in the Benefice of the Ludlow Team Ministry.

John Derby Allcroft was Lord of the Manor and Patron of Saint Michael & All Angels church during the 19th century.

== Transport ==
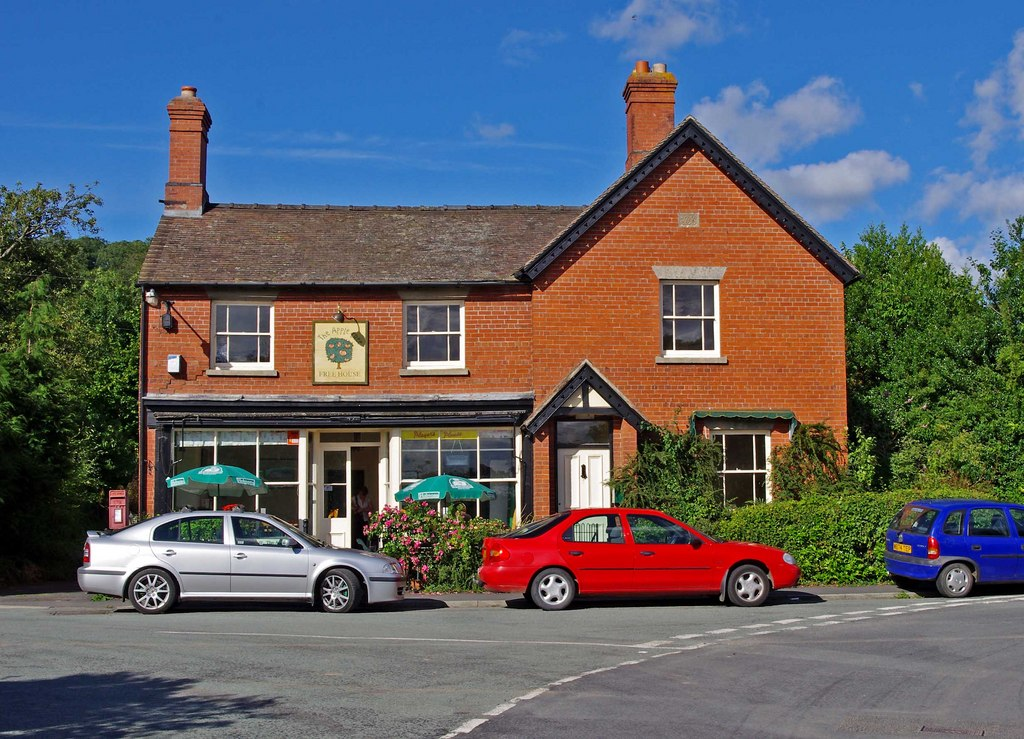
The Apple Tree "bar & bistro"

Onibury had a railway station on the Shrewsbury and Hereford Railway.

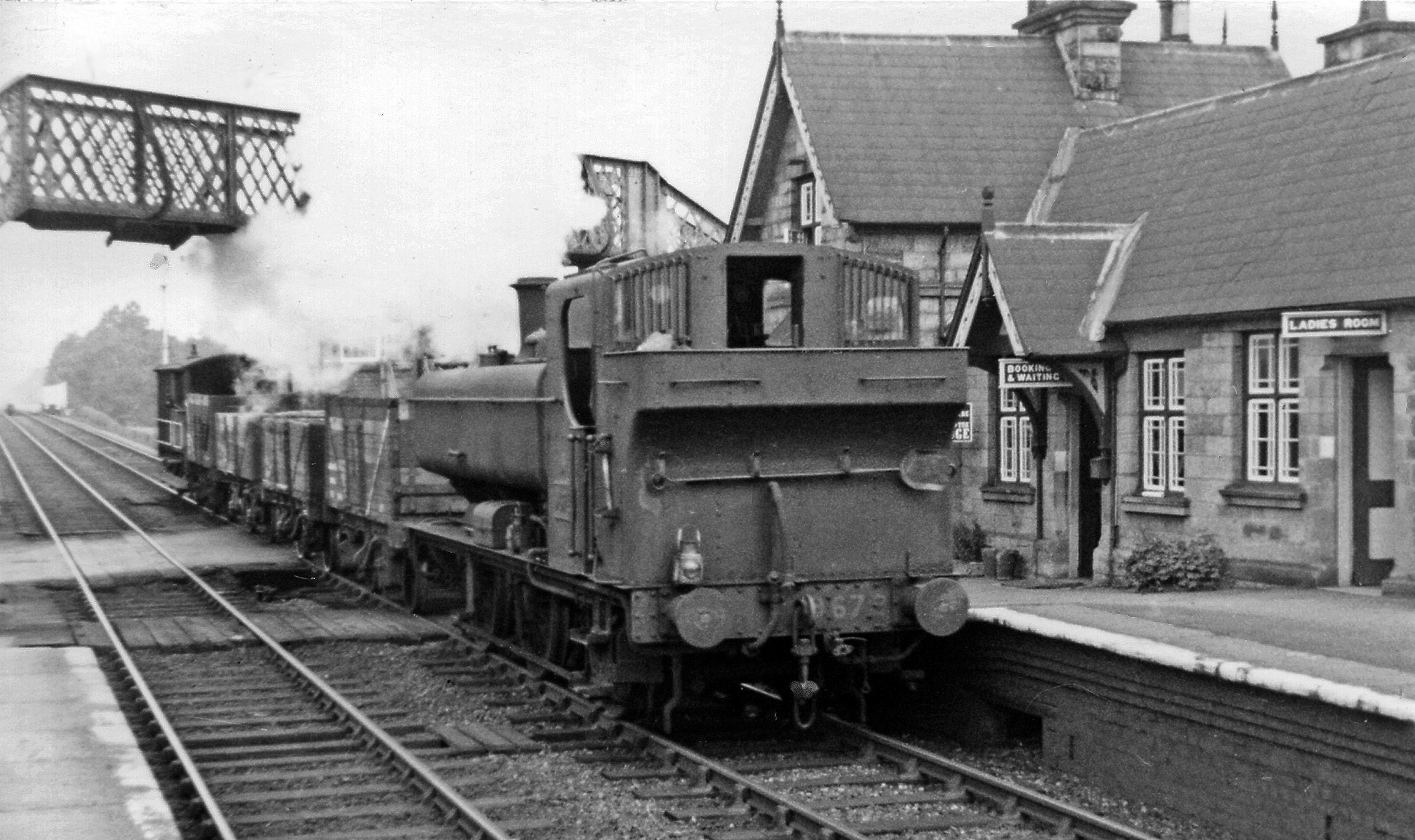
Onibury railway station in 1949

The A49 road passes through the village and there is a level crossing, where there is still a signal box.

National Cycle Network route 44 passes through, via the country lanes, en route between Ludlow and Bishop's Castle.

== Places near Onibury ==
- Stokesay Castle
- Stokesay Court

== See also ==
- Listed buildings in Onibury
