= Foliot =

Foliot may refer to:

- Foliot (timepiece), part of the verge escapement for early clocks
- A member of a fictional people in the high fantasy novel The Worm Ouroboros by E. R. Eddison
- A fictional magical creature in the Bartimaeus Sequence by Jonathan Stroud

== Surname ==
- Gilbert Foliot (1110-1187), Abbot of Gloucester, Bishop of Hereford, Bishop of London
- Hugh Foliot (1155–1234), Bishop of Hereford
- Jordan Foliot (c 1249-1298), 1st Baron, Foliot, Lord of the Manor of Wellow, Nottinghamshire
- Ralph Foliot (died c. 1198), nephew of Gilbert
- Richard Foliot (fl. 1290), Knight of Jordan Castle, father of Jordan
- Robert Foliot (died 1186), Bishop of Hereford
