= Siege of Užice (1738) =

- Part of the Austro-Turkish War of 1737–1739
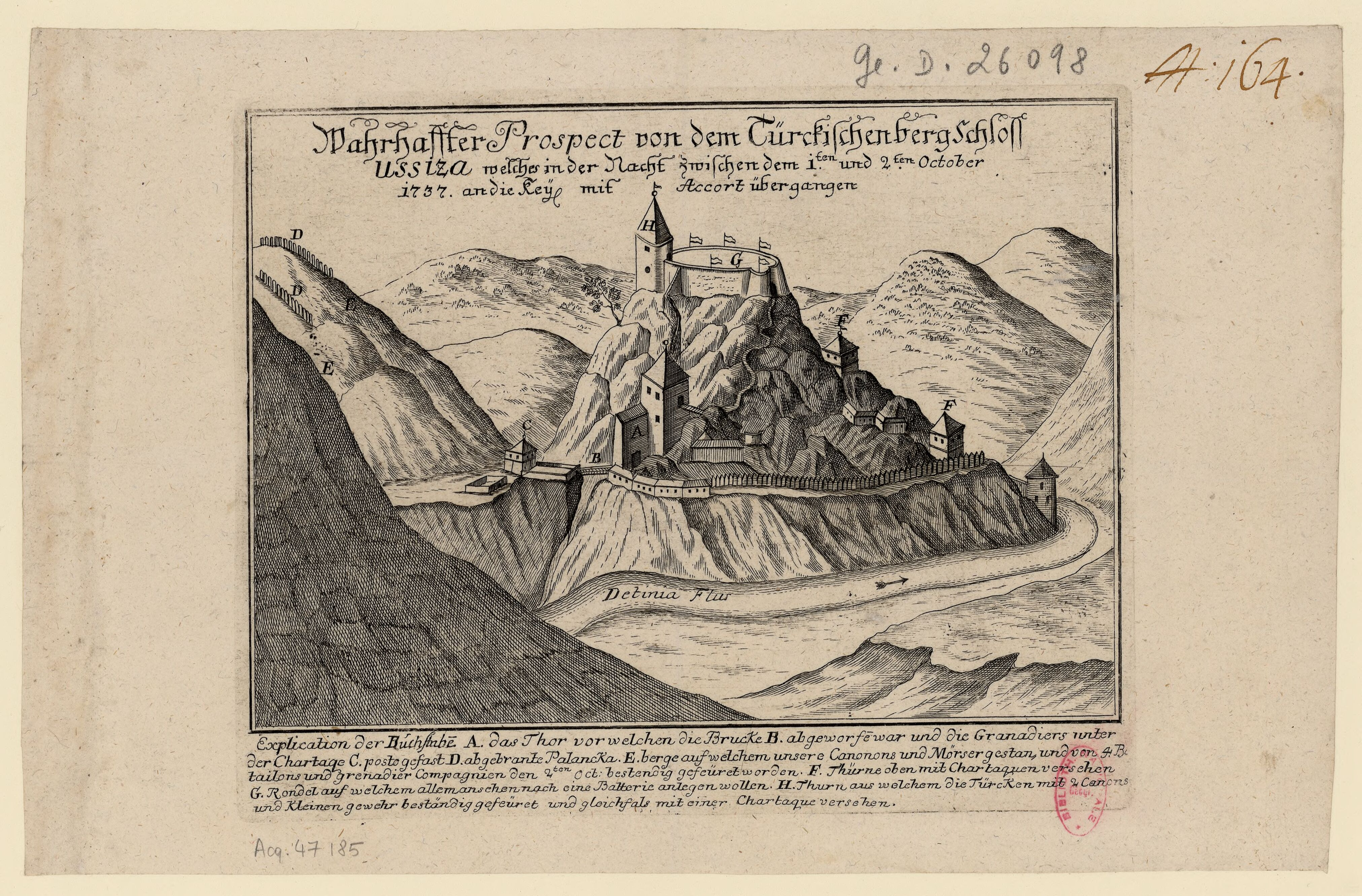
- Castle of Užice in 1737
Date	1 – 23 March 1738
Location	Užice, Ottoman Empire (Under Habsburg occupation)
Result	Ottoman victory

Belligerents
Habsburg monarchy	Ottoman Empire

Commanders and leaders
Captain Schenk	Beylerbey Ibrahim Pasha

Strength
320 men 2 field guns	6,000 men 2 heavy guns

Casualties and losses
Unknown	Unknown

The siege of Užice was a military engagement in 1738 between the Austrian garrison and the besieging Ottoman army. The Ottomans captured Užice after a 3-week siege.

== Background ==
On October 2, 1737, the Austrian army, with the help of Serbian troops, captured the city of Užice from a 200-strong Ottoman garrison. After the surrender of Niš to the Ottomans, only Užice remained in the Imperial hands. The city could not hold out much longer due to a lack of Imperial reinforcements. At the end of 1737, the Austrians retreated behind the borders, and in early 1738, the Ottomans drove out the remaining Imperial units in Transylvania. Following this, the Ottomans turned their attention to Užice.

== Siege ==
The Ottoman governor of Bosnia, Ali Pasha, gathered around 20,000 men. He assigned 6,000 men to recapture Užice led by Beylerbey Ibrahim Pasha. On March 1st, the Ottomans appeared in front of Uzice which was defended by 320 Imperials led by Captain Schenk. With this small force, the Imperial defended the place successfully against the Ottomans for 3 weeks. The Ottomans then received two heavy guns from Zvornik on March 23, with these two guns, the Ottomans successfully destroyed the tower of the castle to rubble. The tower held the two field guns which were three pounds that the Imperials used to return fire against the Ottomans. Seeing this, the Imperials were forced to hand Užice to the Ottomans in exchange for a safe departure to Belgrade. After the fall of Uzice, the Ottomans gradually expanded throughout the territory of Serbia unharmed.

== Sources ==
- K. und K. Kriegsarchiv (1891), Chronicle of the Austro-Hungarian War: The south-eastern theater of war in the lands of the Hungarian crown, Dalmatia and Bosnia (Germany).
- Gyémánt Richárd, Charles's second war against the Turks (1737–1739) (Magyar).
- József Bánlaky: Military history of the Hungarian nation (MEK-OSZK), 0014/1149. Minor operations preceding the action of the main armies. Fighting around Uzice, Orsova, Ada Kaleh, and Mehádia (Magyar).
