= Kleinwort baronets =

Baronetcy in the Baronetage of the United Kingdom

Escutcheon of the Kleinwort baronets of Bolnore

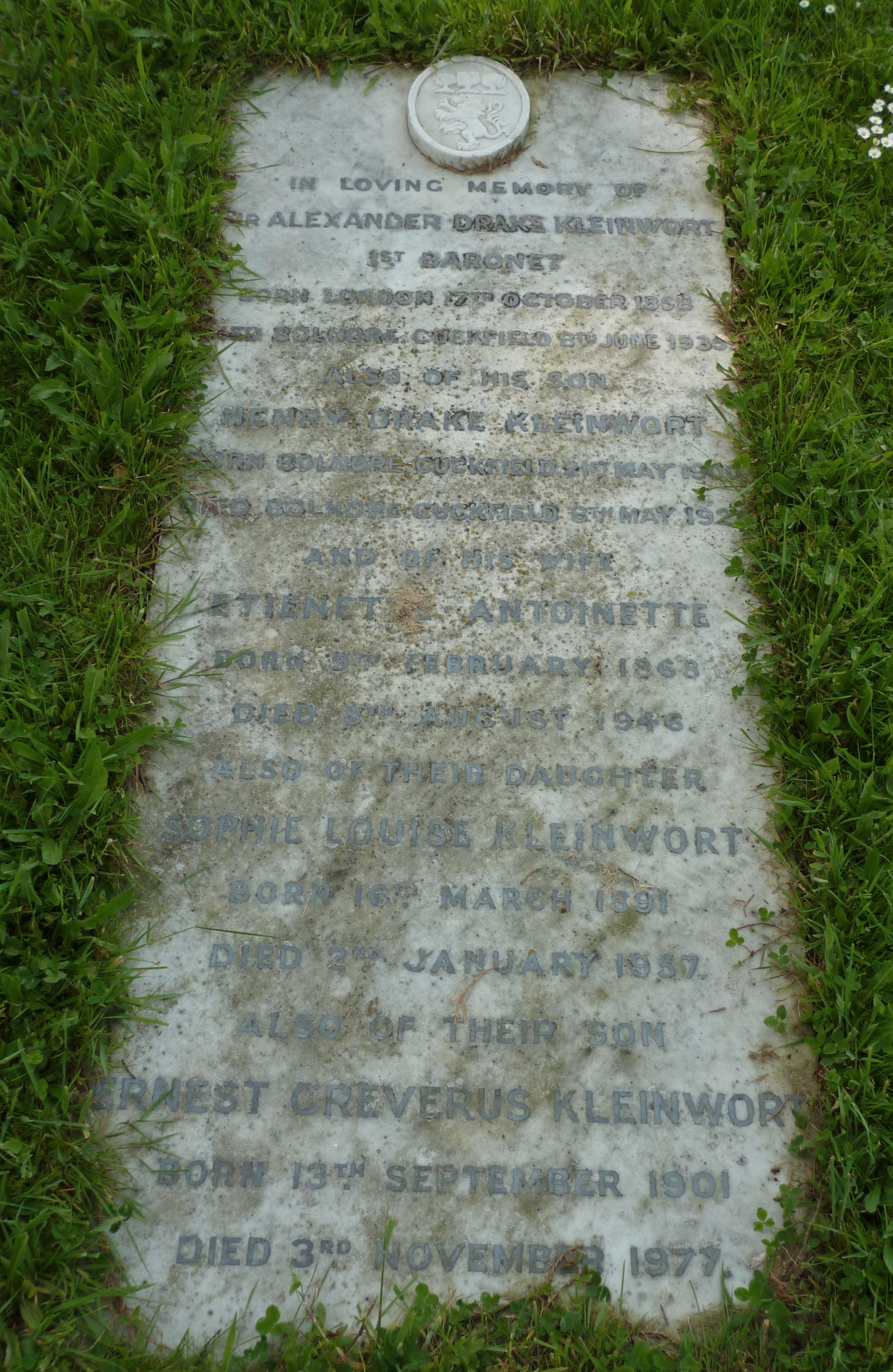
The grave of Sir Alexander Drake Kleinwort, 1st Baronet of Bolnore, at the Holy Trinity Church, Cuckfield, West Sussex; photographed in 2014

The Kleinwort baronetcy, of Bolnore in Cuckfield in the County of Sussex, is a title in the Baronetage of the United Kingdom. It was created on 29 November 1909 for Alexander Kleinwort, a banker and a partner in the family firm of Kleinwort, Sons & Co.

== Kleinwort baronets, of Bolnore (1909) ==
- Sir Alexander Drake Kleinwort, 1st Baronet (1858–1935)
- Sir Alexander Santiago Kleinwort, 2nd Baronet (1892–1983)
- Sir Kenneth Drake Kleinwort, 3rd Baronet (1935–1994)
- Sir Richard Drake Kleinwort, 4th Baronet (born 1960)

The heir apparent is the present holder's son Rufus Drake Kleinwort (born 1994).

Baronetage of the United Kingdom
Preceded by Horsfall baronets	Kleinwort baronets of Bolnore; 29 November 1909	Succeeded by Roberts baronets
