= John Folliott (Ballyshannon MP) =

Irish politician

Colonel John Folliott, of Ballymacward (or Ffolliott; 1660–1697) was an Irish politician.

He was the eldest son of John Ffolliott of Ballyshannon by his wife Johanna, daughter of Dr Edward Synge; Francis Folliott, M.P. was his younger brother. He sat in the Irish House of Commons for Ballyshannon from 1692 to 1693. He was the father of John Folliot.
