= Francis Folliott =

Francis Folliott (1667–1701) was an Irish Member of Parliament.

== Biography ==
He was a younger son of John Ffolliott of Ballyshannon by his wife Johanna, daughter of Dr Edward Synge; John Folliott MP was his older brother. He sat in the Irish House of Commons for Ballyshannon from 1692 to 1693 and from 1695 to 1699. By his wife Letitia, daughter of Sir James Cuffe and Alice Aungier, he was the father of John Folliott, also an MP.
