= Ballyshannon (Parliament of Ireland constituency) =

Pre-1801 Irish constituency

- Former borough constituency for the Irish House of Commons
- County: County Donegal
- Borough: Ballyshannon

1613–1801
- Seats: 2
- Replaced by: Disfranchised

Ballyshannon was a constituency represented in the Irish House of Commons from 1613 to 1800.

== Borough ==
This constituency was the parliamentary borough of Ballyshannon in County Donegal. It returned two members to the Parliament of Ireland from 1613 to 1800.

== Members of Parliament, 1613–1801 ==
Election	First MP		Second MP
April 1613	Paul Gore		Edward Cherry
1613	Paul Gore		Sir Arthur Savage
June 1634	Thomas Leake		Michael Stanhope
December 1634	James Dillon		Michael Stanhope
1639	Sir Robert Meredith		James Cusack
April 1661	John Bridges (Note: Also elected for Kilmallock, for which he chose to sit)		Sir Anthony Morgan (Note: Also elected for Taghmon, for which he chose to sit)
May 1661	Robert King		William Hill
1689	Ballyshannon was not represented in the Patriot Parliament.		
1692	Francis Folliott		John Folliott
1695	Francis Folliott		Hon. Henry Folliott
1697	Francis Folliott		Richard Warburton
1703	Richard Geering		Richard Warburton
1713	Owen Wynne		John Rochfort
November 1727	William Conolly (Note: Also elected for County Londonderry in 1727, for which he chose to sit)	Whig	Thomas Pearson
1727	William James Conolly		Thomas Pearson
1737	William James Conolly		Edward Walpole (Note: Knighted in 1753)
1754	Michael Clarke		Edward Walpole
May 1761	Michael Clarke		Thomas Conolly (Note: Also elected for County Londonderry in 1761, for which he chose to sit)
1761	Michael Clarke		John Gustavus Handcock
1766	Michael Clarke		Hugh Henry Mitchell
1768	Michael Clarke		Francis Andrews (Note: Also elected for Londonderry City in 1768, for which he chose to sit)
1769	Michael Clarke		William Gamble
1776	John Staples		Sir Michael Cromie
1783	William Ogilvie		Sir Michael Cromie
1790	Thomas Dickson		Sir Michael Cromie
January 1798	Viscount Corry		David Babington
1798	Sir William Richardson		David Babington
1801	Disenfranchised		

== Bibliography ==
- Return of Members of Parliament (1878), vol. ii, p. 611–612.
- O'Hart, John (2007). The Irish and Anglo-Irish Landed Gentry: When Cromwell came to Ireland. Vol. II. Heritage Books. ISBN 0-7884-1927-7.
- Leigh Rayment's historical List of Members of the Irish House of Commons. Cites: Johnston-Liik, Edith Mary (2002). The History of the Irish Parliament 1692-1800 (6 volumes). Ulster Historical Foundation.
