= List of Commissioners' churches in Yorkshire =

A Commissioners' church is an Anglican church in the United Kingdom built with money voted by Parliament as a result of the Church Building Act 1818, and subsequent related Acts. Such churches have been given a number of titles, including "Commissioners' Churches", "Waterloo Churches" and "Million Act Churches". In some cases the Commissioners provided the full cost of the new church; in other cases they provided a grant and the balance was raised locally. This list contains the Commissioners' churches in Yorkshire.

== Key ==
Grade	Criteria
Grade I	Buildings of exceptional interest, sometimes considered to be internationally important.
Grade II*	Particularly important buildings of more than special interest.
Grade II	Buildings of national importance and special interest.
"—" denotes a work that is not graded.

== Churches ==
Name and location	Photograph	Date	Grant in £	Architect	Notes and refs.	Grade
St George, Barnsley; 53.5507°N 1.4852°W		1821–22	5,963	Thomas Rickman	Gothic Revival with bell turret and clerestory. Demolished 1993.	II
St Lawrence, Pudsey, Leeds; 53.7934°N 1.6669°W		1821–23	13,475	Thomas Taylor	Gothic Revival with tower. Restored in 1907.	II
St Peter, Stanley, Wakefield; 53.7135°N 1.4717°W		1821–24	11,989	Peter Atkinson Jnr and R. H. Sharp	Gothic Revival with turrets. Burned in 1911; rebuilt 1913.	II
St George, Sheffield; 53.3818°N 1.4807°W		1821–25	15,181	John Woodhead and William Hurst	Gothic Revival with tower.	II
Christ Church, Attercliffe, Sheffield		1822–26	12,041	Thomas Taylor	Gothic Revival with tower. Bombed 1940; demolished other than the tower 1950.	—
St Philip, Shalesmoor, Sheffield		1822–27	13,116	Thomas Taylor	Gothic Revival with tower. Demolished 1952.	—
St Paul, Alverthorpe, 53.6922°N 1.5316°W		1823–25	8,082	Peter Atkinson Jnr and R. H. Sharp	Gothic Revival with tower.	II
St Paul, Hanging Heaton; 53.7044°N 1.6091°W		1823–25	4,811	Thomas Taylor	Gothic Revival with tower. Altered in 1894.	II
Christ Church, Meadow Lane, Leeds		1823–25	10,555	R. D. Chantrell	Gothic Revival with tower. Demolished 1972.	—
St Mary, Quarry Hill, Leeds		1823–25	10,809	Thomas Taylor	Gothic Revival with tower. Demolished late 1970s.	—
St Paul, Shipley; 53.8339°N 1.7827°W		1823–25	7,992	John Oates	Gothic Revival with tower. Restored in 1876.	II
St Matthew, Wilsden; 53.8242°N 1.8607°W		1823–25	8,174	John Oates	Gothic Revival with tower. Closed in 1954; since demolished.	—
St Mark, Woodhouse, Leeds; 53.8119°N 1.5534°W		1823–26	9,637	Peter Atkinson Jnr and R. H. Sharp	Gothic Revival with tower. Open see www.gatewayleeds.net .	II
St John, Dewsbury Moor; 53.6919°N 1.6508°W		1823–27	5,918	Thomas Taylor	Gothic Revival with tower.	II
St Peter, Earlsheaton, Dewsbury		1825–27	5,301	Thomas Taylor	Gothic Revival with transepts, tower and spire. Demolished 1971.	—
St Cuthbert, Pateley Bridge; 54.0879°N 1.7583°W		1825–27	2,000	John Woodhead and William Hurst	Gothic Revival with tower.	II
St Mary, Greasbrough, Rotherham; 53.4583°N 1.3450°W		1826–28	2,000	Charles Watson and J. P. Pritchett	Gothic Revival with tower.	II
Christ Church, Scarborough; 54.2812°N 0.4017°W		1826–28	4,733	Peter Atkinson Jnr and R. H. Sharp	Gothic Revival with tower. Chancel added 1873. Redundant in 1977.	—
St Mary, Sheffield; 53.3725°N 1.4716°W		1826–29	13,941	Joseph Potter	Gothic Revival with tower. Bombed in World War II. Rebuilt in 1957.	II*
Christ Church, Linthwaite; 53.6263°N 1.8462°W		1827–28	3,035	Peter Atkinson Jnr and R. H. Sharp	Gothic Revival with west tower and spire. Chancel and other additions 1895.	II
Holy Trinity, South Crosland; 53.6112°N 1.8237°W		1827–29	2,272	Peter Atkinson Jnr	Gothic Revival with tower.	II
St John, Golcar; 53.6389°N 1.8552°W		1828–29	3,133	Peter Atkinson Jnr	Gothic Revival with tower and spire. Chancel added 1862.	II
Holy Trinity, Idle, Bradford; 53.8380°N 1.7314°W		1828–29	3,115	John Oates	Gothic Revival with tower and spire. Vestry added 1895.	II
St Stephen, Kirkstall, Leeds; 53.8180°N 1.5984°W		1828–29	3,206	R. D. Chantrell	Gothic Revival with west tower and spire. Church enlarged in 1864 and 1874.	II
St Stephen, Lindley; 53.6589°N 1.8226°W		1828–29	2,714	John Oates	Gothic Revival with west tower and spire.	II
Emmanuel, Lockwood; 53.6302°N 1.7954°W		1828–29	3,047	R. D. Chantrell	Gothic Revival with west turret. Chancel added 1899.	II
All Saints, Paddock, Huddersfield		1828–29	2,706	John Oates	Gothic Revival with tower and spire. Redundant.	—
Christ Church, Stannington; 53.3919°N 1.5470°W		1828–29	2,820	John Woodhead and William Hurst	Gothic Revival with west turret.	II
St Paul, Huddersfield; 53.6438°N 1.7798°W		1828–30	5,700	John Oates	Gothic Revival with tower and spire. Chancel added 1883. Now part of the University of Huddersfield.	II
St Paul, Birkenshaw; 53.7503°N 1.6931°W		1829–30	3,310	Peter Atkinson Jnr and R. H. Sharp	Gothic Revival. Tower, spire and chancel added in 1892.	II
St Matthew, Holbeck, Leeds; 53.7854°N 1.5593°W		1829–30	3,349	R. D. Chantrell	Gothic Revival with west tower. Spire and other additions 1860. Now used as a community centre.	II
St Peter, Morley; 53.7530°N 1.6006°W		1829–30	2,968	R. D. Chantrell	Gothic Revival with tower and spire. Chancel added 1885.	II
All Saints, Netherthong; 53.5835°N 1.7903°W		1829–30	2,557	R. D. Chantrell	Gothic Revival with west turret. Chancel added 1877.	II
Christ Church, New Mill; 53.5747°N 1.7506°W		1829–30	3,525	Peter Atkinson	Gothic Revival with tower. Rebuilt in 1882.	II
St James, Thornes, Wakefield; 53.6729°N 1.5021°W		1829–30	1,000	Samuel Sharp	Neoclassical with west tower.	II
St James, Myton, Hull		1829–31	3,591	Joseph Hansom	Gothic Revival with tower. Bombed in World War II; demolished 1957.	—
St Peter, Hoyland; 53.5026°N 1.4536°W		1830	1,000	Watson, Pritchett and Watson	Gothic Revival with tower and spire.	II
St Martin, Brighouse; 53.7042°N 1.7841°W		1830–31	3,605	Lees Hammerton	Gothic Revival with tower. Chancel added 1905.	II
St John, Cleckheaton; 53.7246°N 1.7098°W		1830–31	2,632	Peter Atkinson Jnr and R. H. Sharp	Gothic Revival with tower. Chancel added 1854. All but the tower replaced 1886–88.	II
St James, Halifax		1830–31	4,196	John Oates	Gothic Revival with two west turrets. Demolished 1955.	—
St James, Heckmondwike; 53.7069°N 1.6702°W		1830–31	2,805	Peter Atkinson Jnr and R. H. Sharp	Gothic Revival with a tower and spire. Chancel added in 1906.	II
St James the Great, Hebden Bridge; 53.7434°N 2.0252°W		1832–33	3,047	John Oates	Gothic Revival with a west tower. Chancel added in 1876.	II
St John, Ovenden		1838	1,070	Charles Child	Gothic Revival with west tower	—
St John the Baptist, Cragg Vale; 53.7053°N 2.0007°W		1838–39	452	Charles Child	Gothic Revival with tower	II
Christ Church, Battyeford, Mirfield		1839–40	691	Ignatius Bonomi	Gothic Revival with a west tower. Demolished 1971 after a fire.	—
Christ Church, Bridlington; 54.0847°N 0.1932°W		1840	100	Sir George Gilbert Scott and Moffat	Gothic Revival. Enlarged in 1857. Tower added in 1859.	II
Holy Trinity, Batley Carr, Batley; 53.7013°N 1.6359°W		1840–41	300	R. D. Chantrell	Gothic Revival. West tower added in 1895.	II
St Mark, Sutton, Hull		1841–42	500	H. F. Lockwood	Gothic Revival with tower. Bombed in World War II; demolished.	—
St John the Evangelist, Ingrow, Keighley; 53.8552°N 1.9162°W		1841–42	500	Walker Rawstorne	Lombardic with west tower.	II
St Thomas, Kimberworth; 53.4339°N 1.3941°W		1841–42	600	Matthew Habershon	Gothic Revival with west tower. Chancel added 1882.	II
Holy Trinity, Thurgoland		1841–42	150	William Hurst and William Moffatt	Gothic Revival with belfry. Demolished and replaced 1870.	—
St John the Evangelist, Farsley; 53.8110°N 1.6718°W		1842–43	300	William Wallen	Gothic Revival with tower. Tower rebuilt 1895.	II
Holy Trinity, Queensbury; 53.7669°N 1.8492°W		1842–43	500	James Mallinson	Gothic Revival with tower. Chancel added 1885. Tower rebuilt 1906.	II
St John, Dodworth; 53.5408°N 1.5302°W		1843–44	250	Benjamin Taylor	Norman Revival with tower. Since restored.	II
St Andrew, Cavendish Street, Leeds		1843–44	300	Sir George Gilbert Scott and Moffatt	Gothic Revival with west bell turret. Demolished.	—
St John the Evangelist, Yeadon		1843–44	300	Walker Rawsthorne	Gothic Revival. Chancel added 1893.	—
St Paul, Denholme Gate; 53.7967°N 1.8927°W		1843–46	500	Chantrell and Shaw	Gothic Revival with tower and spire. Redundant in 2002.	II
Holy Trinity, Cowling, Craven; 53.8841°N 2.0499°W		1844–45	500	J. B. Chantrell	Gothic Revival with tower.	II
All Saints, Roberttown		1844–45	300	Chantrell and Shaw	Gothic Revival with bell turret.	—
St John, Upper Hopton; 53.6628°N 1.7031°W		1844–45	100	Ignatius Bonomi and J. A. Cory	Gothic Revival with a west tower.	II
St Paul, King Cross, Halifax; 53.7151°N 1.8831°W		1844–46	300	R. D. Chantrell	Gothic Revival with tower and spire. Replaced in 1912, other than the steeple.	II
Christ Church, Oakworth; 53.8458°N 1.9545°W		1845–46	500	William Wallen	Gothic Revival with belfry.	II
St Philip, Wellington Street, Leeds		1845–47	300	C. W. Burleigh	Gothic Revival with tower and spire. Demolished 1931.	—
St Paul, Shepley; 53.5837°N 1.7121°W		1845–48	100	William Wallen	Chancel added 1868.	II
St Paul, Sculcoates, Hull		1846–47	500	W. F. Dykes	Gothic Revival with steeple. Bombed in World War II; demolished.	—
St Mary the Virgin, Wyke; 53.7366°N 1.7717°W		1846–47	500	James Mallinson and Thomas Healey	Gothic Revival with tower and spire.	II
St Luke, Eccleshill, Bradford; 53.8160°N 1.7198°W		1846–48	1,114	Walker Rawstorne	Gothic Revival with tower and spire. Chancel added in 1913.	—
St James, Woodside, Horsforth; 53.5690°N 1.7949°W		1846–48	200	C. W. Burleigh	Gothic Revival.	II
St John, Upperthong; 53.5690°N 1.7949°W		1846–48	200	E. H. Shellard	Gothic Revival with large south tower and transepts. Chancel added 1875.	II
St Peter, Walsden; 53.6950°N 2.0988°W		1846–48	250	Charles Child	Gothic Revival with a tower and spire. Following a fire the nave was replaced but the spire remains.	II
St Matthew, Dewsbury		1847–48	250	Ignatius Bonomi and John Augustus Cory	Gothic Revival with a massive tower. Since restored.	II
Christ Church, East Knottingley; 53.7108°N 1.2381°W		1847–48	200	Charles Vickers	Gothic Revival with a bell gable. Since demolished.	—
St Michael, Mytholmroyd; 53.7302°N 1.9811°W		1847–48	300	James Mallinson and Thomas Healey	Gothic Revival with west tower. Chancel added 1887.	II
St Michael, Whitby		1847–48	150	J. B. and W. Atkinson	Gothic Revival style. Demolished.	—
St Matthew, Bankfoot, Bradford; 53.7690°N 1.7639°W		1848–49	200	James Mallinson and Thomas Healey	Gothic Revival with a bell gable and spirelet.	II
St Jude, Eldon Street, Sheffield		1848–49	250	Joseph Mitchell	Gothic Revival. Demolished 1947	—
St John, Whitby; 54.4855°N 0.6168°W		1848–49	750	J. B. and W. Atkinson	Gothic Revival style.	II
St Mary the Virgin, Oxenhope; 53.8081°N 1.9557°W		1849	250	Ignatius Bonomi and J. A. Cory	Norman Revival with west tower.	II
St Michael and All Angels, Shelf; 53.7572°N 1.8034°W		1849	250	James Mallinson and Thomas Healey	Gothic Revival with bell gable.	—
St John the Baptist, Clayton, Bradford; 53.7838°N 1.8214°W		1849–50	1,031	James Mallinson and Thomas Healey	Gothic Revival style.	II
All Saints, York Road, Leeds		1849–50	300	James Mallinson and Thomas Healey	Gothic Revival with spire. Demolished and replaced 1980.	—
St Luke, East Morton; 53.8728°N 1.8537°W		1849–50	500	William Perkin and Elisha Backhouse		—
Christ Church; Pitsmoor, Sheffield; 53.3968°N 1.4674°W		1849–50	232	William Flockton and Thomas Lee	Gothic Revival with west tower. Additions in 1895.	II
St Jude, Moorfields, Sheffield		1849–52; 1854–55	350	Joseph Mitchell; Flockton and Son	Gothic Revival with bell turret. The tower fell in on the nave and the church had to be rebuilt. Demolished.	—
St Mary the Virgin, Gomersal; 53.7292°N 1.6888°W		1850–51	180	John Dobson	Gothic Revival with a tower. Transepts added 1864.	II
St Matthew, Camp Road, Little London, Leeds		1850–51	200	C. W. Burleigh	Gothic Revival with southwest tower, spire and transepts. Demolished.	—
Christ Church, Ossett; 53.6704°N 1.5726°W		1850–51	200	James Mallinson and Thomas Healey	Gothic Revival with tower. Spire added later.	II
St Andrew, North Horton, Bradford		1851–52	200	James Mallinson and Thomas Healey	Gothic Revival with northeast tower. Spire added 1863. Demolished 1965.	—
St John the Evangelist, Cullingworth; 53.8284°N 1.8992°W		1851–53	500	William Perkin and Elisha Backhouse	Gothic Revival with a tower and spire. Restored in 1902.	II
St John the Baptist, New Wortley, Leeds		1852	350	Jeremiah Dobson	Gothic Revival with a tower and spire. Demolished.	—
Christ Church, Barkisland, Halifax; 53.6754°N 1.9193°W		1852–53	150	James Mallinson and Thomas Healey	Gothic Revival with a bell gable.	II
St Mary the Virgin, Embsay; 53.9829°N 1.9837°W		1852–53	150	Thomas Shaw	Gothic Revival.	II
St Jude, Hunslet, Leeds		1852–53	300	C. W. Burleigh and Philip Boyce	Gothic Revival. Demolished.	—
St Michael, Buslingthorpe, Leeds		1852–54	300	R. D. Chantrell	Gothic Revival. Demolished 1969.	—
St Thomas, Brightside, Sheffield; 53.4212°N 1.4188°W		1852–53	100	Flockton and Son	Gothic Revival with southwest tower and spire.	II
St Stephen, Burmantofts, Leeds		1853–54	200	R. D. Chantrell	Gothic Revival with bell turret. Demolished.	—
Christ Church, Mount Pellon, Halifax; 53.7308°N 1.8889°W		1853–54	125	James Mallinson and Thomas Healey	Gothic Revival with southwest turret. Later enlarged.	II
St Mary, Wakefield		1853–54	300	Charles Clapham	Gothic Revival with southwest tower and spire. Enlarged 1887.	—
St Thomas, The Groves, York; 53.9678°N 1.0795°W		1853–54	50	George Fowler Jones	Gothic Revival with bell turret on the west gable.	II
Christ Church, Brampton Bierlow; 53.5033°N 1.3659°W		1854–55	125	Pritchett and Sons	Gothic Revival with a tower and chancel.	II
St Barnabas, Brewery Field, Leeds		1854–55	250	John T. Fairbank	Gothic Revival style. Demolished.	—
St Matthew; Carver Street, Sheffield; 53.3797°N 1.4733°W		1854–55	200	Flockton and Son	Gothic Revival style with west steeple. Chancel added 1884.	II
St Mary the Virgin, Eastwood		1854–56	230	William Perkin and Elisha Backhouse	Gothic Revival with a bell gable. Demolished.	—
Holy Trinity, Knaresborough; 54.0064°N 1.4660°W		1854–56	300	Joseph Fawcett	Gothic Revival with a tower and spire.	II
St Paul, Pudsey		1855–56	200	William Perkin and Elisha Backhouse	Gothic Revival.	—

== See also ==
- List of Commissioners' churches in eastern England
- List of Commissioners' churches in the English Midlands
- List of Commissioners' churches in London
- List of Commissioners' churches in Northeast and Northwest England
- List of Commissioners' churches in southwest England
- List of Commissioners' churches in Wales
