= List of Commissioners' churches in northern England =

This list has been split and items formerly under this title can be found at:

- List of Commissioners' churches in Northeast and Northwest England
- List of Commissioners' churches in Yorkshire
