= Christ Church, Stannington =

Church in Stannington, Sheffield, UK

Coordinates: 53.391871°N 1.547073°W

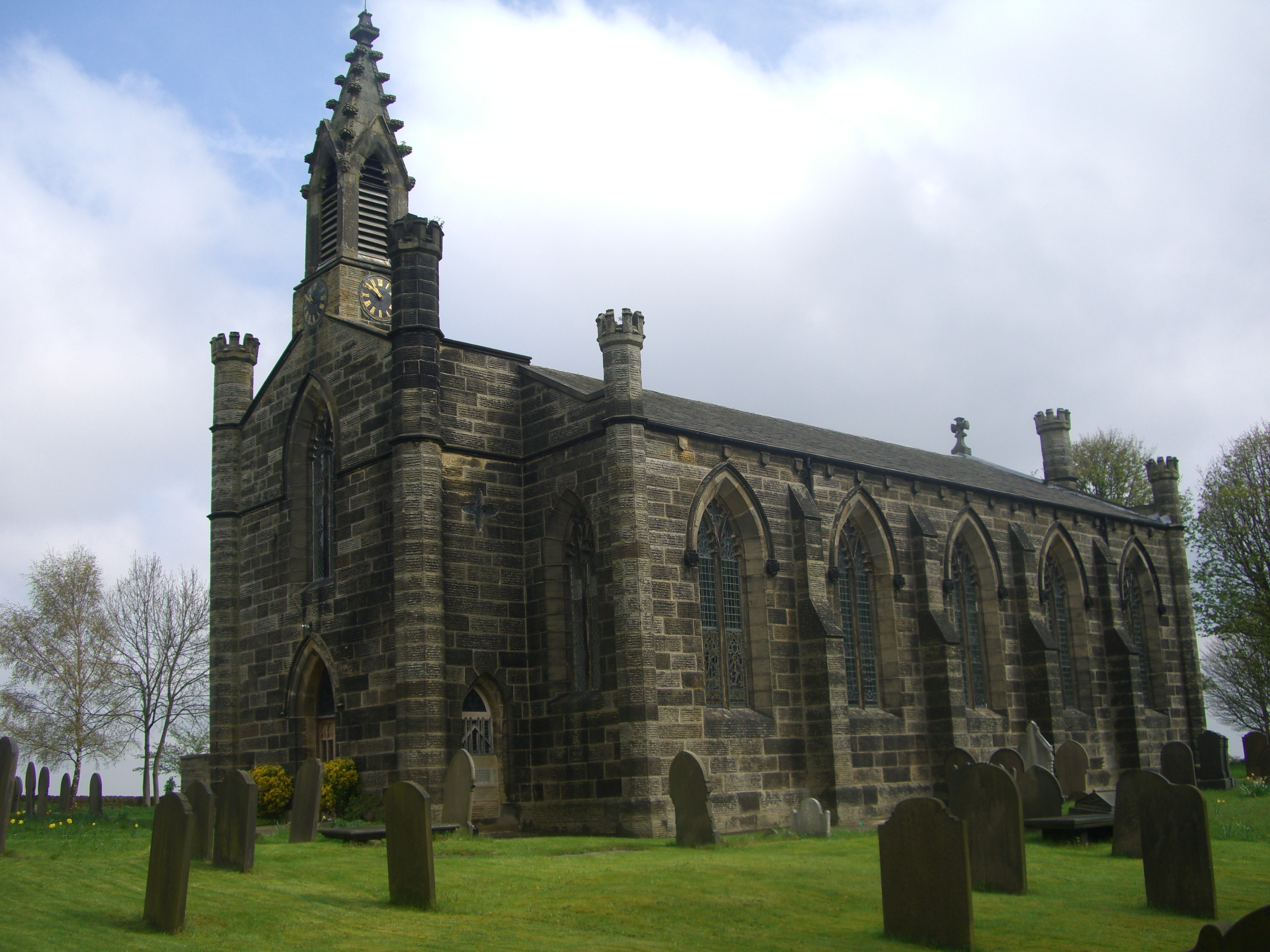

Christ Church is an Anglican place of worship situated on Church Street in the Stannington area of the City of Sheffield, England. It is a Commissioners' church or “Million Church” as it was built partly with money provided by the Church Building Act 1824. It is recorded in the National Heritage List for England as a designated Grade II listed building.

== History ==
The construction of Christ Church was completed in 1830 with the architects Woodhead & Hurst of Doncaster overseeing the building work. Architectural plans were drawn up in 1827 and the foundation stone was laid on 16 October 1828 by Thomas Richard Ryder, Vicar of Ecclesfield. The dignitaries at the ceremony included William Hurst, one of the architects who by then had become Mayor of Doncaster; after the stone laying the party retired to the Peacock Inn for afternoon tea. The final cost of the church was £3,000 with part of the funding coming from the second parliamentary grant of the Church Building Act which was approved in 1824. However a substantial donation came from Eliza and Ann Harrison of Weston Hall, daughters of Thomas Harrison an eminent Sheffield sawmaker. At the time of its construction Christ Church was within the Chapelry of Bradfield which was within the Bishopric of Ecclesfield, Stannington did not become a separate parish until 1843.

Initially Christ Church did not have a vicar but used a curate, Mr. William Gill who lived in Bradfield, three miles to the north-west. Mr Gill conducted a morning service along with his other duties for six years but resigned in 1836 when he was asked to perform an evening service as well. These events led to the building of a much needed vicarage adjacent to the church as well as the provision of a stipend of £100 per annum. In 1843 Stannington became a separate parish with Christ Church as the parish church; William Gill became the first vicar with the stipend increasing to £129 per annum. The church has had several notable vicars over the years: Samuel Parkes was in office for 28 years between 1879 and 1908, Francis Augustine Stebbing was the longest serving vicar between 1916 and 1963, the last incumbent Canon Philip West had, until very recently, been Christ Church's vicar for over 20 years. In September 2014, Tim Fletcher became Priest in charge upon the retirement of Philip West. On 23 January 2023 the Revd Nicholas Lattimer became Priest in charge following the resignation of Tim Fletcher the previous year.

== Architecture and features ==
The church is built from coarse gritstone blocks in a symmetrical Gothic style. There is a low square bell tower with a weather vane on top and a three-faced clock and louvres below. Among the eye catching exterior features are the seven embattled turrets which stand on top of corner piers. The lychgate at the front entrance to the churchyard was erected in July 1940 by Rebecca Nichols in memory of her husband John who died in December 1914. The graveyard was enlarged in 1919 but is now almost full with very little space for new graves.

The exterior of the church has had very few changes while the interior has been re-ordered several times. There was originally seating for 1,000 people but this is now greatly reduced, two long side balconies which went across the windows making the church very dark were removed in 1964 by the Reverend Trevor Hudson. A third balcony still remains along the back wall; at one time it housed the organ and the choir sang from there. The original font was brought from Bradfield by the Reverend Gill in 1927. It was replaced by the Angel Font in July 1945 with the original then installed as a feature in the churchyard; unfortunately it was stolen in 2001.

A major renovation of the interior was undertaken in 1992/93 when the pews were removed and replaced by chairs; a new floor was laid and carpeted throughout and the church was rewired. At the same time a new vestry was added, the font was brought to the front of the church and the baptistery at the rear was enlarged to form a narthex. A large open space was also created at the front of the church by the removal of the choir stalls. The interior also has a wooden roll of honour, which lists the 70 people of the parish killed in the First World War.

== See also ==
- List of Commissioners' churches in Yorkshire
