= St George's Church, Portobello =

Church building in Sheffield, England

St George's
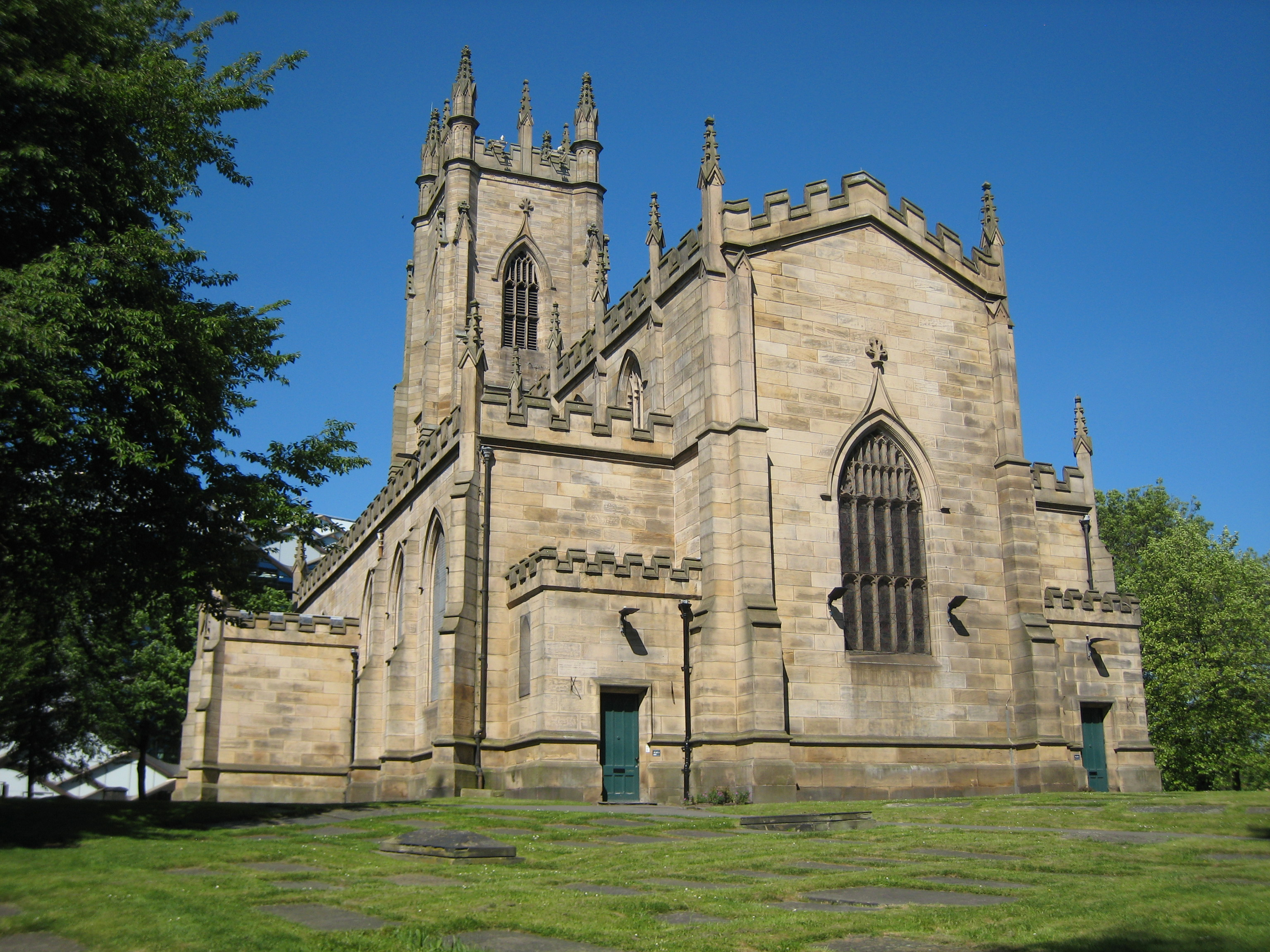
- St George's Church from the southeast

- Location within Sheffield

Religion
- Affiliation: Anglican
- District: Diocese of Sheffield
- Ecclesiastical or organizational status: Redundant church
- Year consecrated: 1825

Location
- Location: Sheffield City Centre; South Yorkshire, England
- Interactive map of St George's
- Coordinates: 53.3817°N 1.4808°W

Architecture
- Architects: Woodhead and Hurst
- Type: Church
- Style: Gothic Revival
- Completed: 1825
- Construction cost: £15,181 (equivalent to £1,230,000 in 2025)

Specifications
- Capacity: 380
- Length: 122 feet (37 m)
- Width: 67 feet (20 m)
- Height (max): 140 feet (43 m)

St George's Church, Portobello, is a former Church of England parish church in the City of Sheffield, England. It is now part of the University of Sheffield and is a lecture theatre and student housing.

St George's is the first of three Commissioners' churches to have been built in Sheffield under the Church Building Act 1818. The other two are St Mary's Church, Bramall Lane, and St Philip's Church, Netherthorpe (demolished 1951). St George's is a Gothic Revival building designed by the architects Woodhead and Hurst in a Perpendicular Gothic style. It was built at a cost of £15,181 (equivalent to £1,230,000 in 2025), the whole cost being met by the Church Building Commission.

The building is 122 feet (37 m) long and 67 feet (20 m) wide and consists of a flat-ceilinged nave with six bays, a single-bay chancel, and a 140 feet (43 m)-high tower. Galleries extended the length of the north and south walls, and there was a two-tiered gallery on the west wall. In total the church could seat 380 people. The foundation stone was laid on 19 July 1821, and the church was consecrated by Archbishop Vernon Harcourt on 29 June 1825.

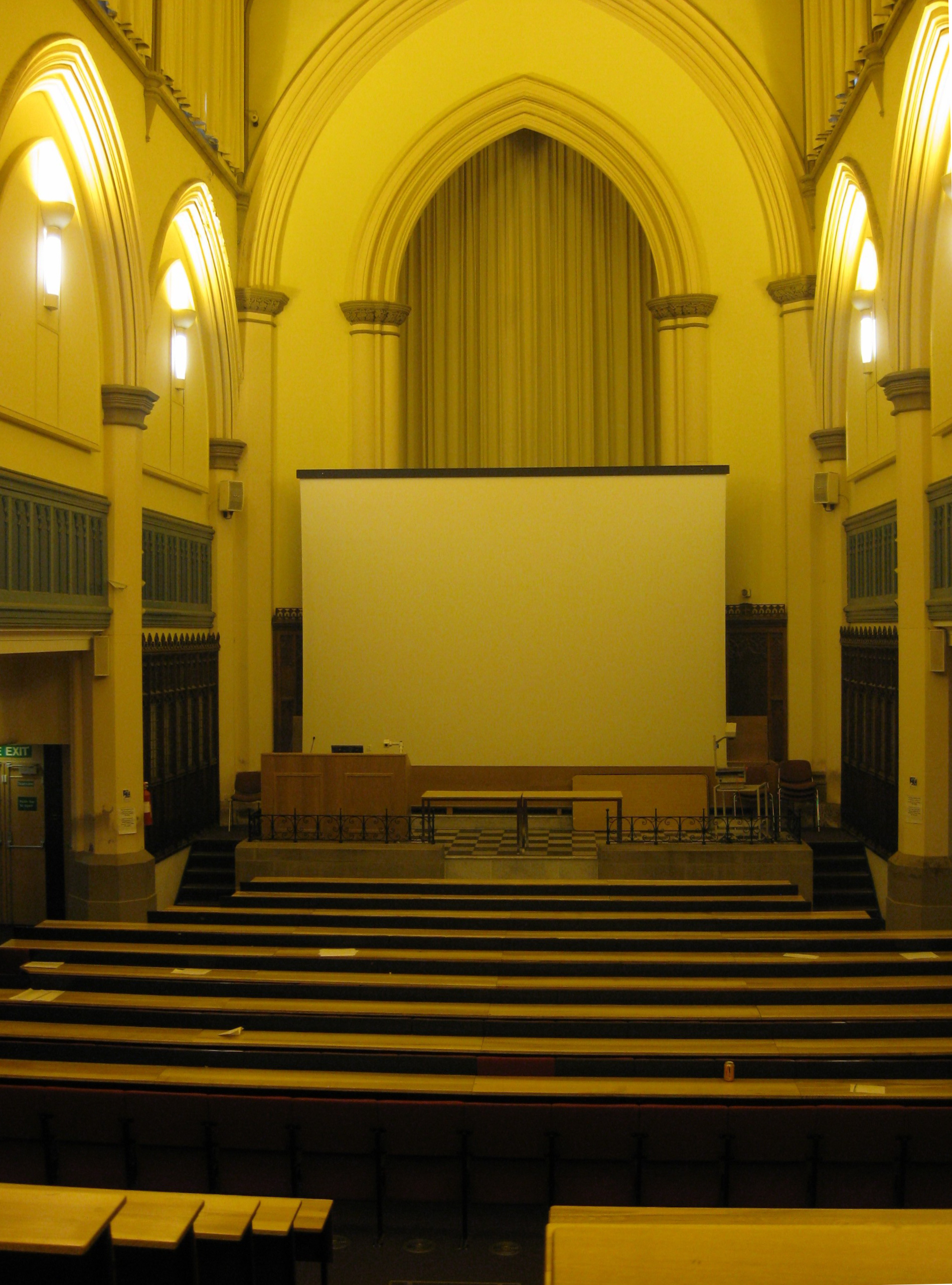
Interior now a lecture theatre

The church was declared redundant and closed in 1981. It stood unused for a number of years until the University of Sheffield acquired it and in 1994 had it converted into a lecture theatre and student accommodation. Prior to this, it had been the last of the Commissioners' churches in Sheffield to retain its original form. It is a Grade II listed building.

In 2010 a nest-box was placed on the church rooftop, which is now home to a breeding pair of peregrine falcons that can be seen via live stream webcam.

== See also ==
- Listed buildings in Sheffield
- List of Commissioners' churches in Yorkshire
