= Shipley Clock Tower =

Clock tower in Shipley, England

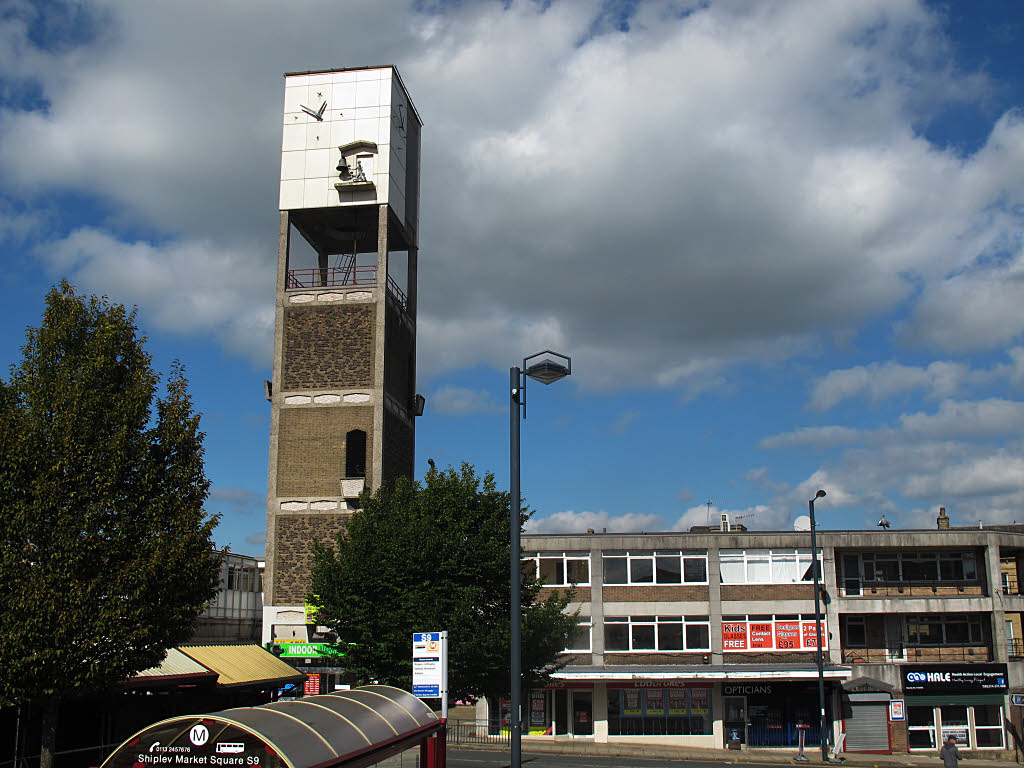
- The clock tower from the market in 2016
- Interactive map of Shipley Clock Tower
- 53°50′03″N 1°46′39″W

History
- Built: 1960–61

Shipley Clock Tower was opened in 1961 in the town of Shipley, West Yorkshire. A clock tower built in the Festival of Britain style, its surrounding site is occupied by the Underground Market.

== History ==
Shipley Clock Tower was constructed between 1960 and 1961, in the Festival of Britain style as part of the local Arndale Shopping Centre. This shopping centre, and thus the tower as a centerpiece, was opened by TV presenter Bruce Forsyth in 1961.

Leaflets featuring the tower were produced in 2000 to encourage tourists to come to Shipley as well as Saltaire. In July 2009, the clock tower was refurbished, setting it to chime on time, and it was additionally lit professionally. This lighting was used that October when the clock tower was lit up in pink to mark Breast Cancer Awareness Month.

In 2023, Bradford Council published a draft development framework for Shipley, planning out a regeneration of the town's Market Square. Recommendations in this document included plans to make a new viewing platform in the clock tower, "towards Baildon Moor and surrounding countryside." In April 2024, a £4 million refurbishment was approved for Shipley, paid for by the government-backed Shipley Towns Fund with £3 million as well as £1 million from the West Yorkshire Combined Authority. After hearing of these refurbishments, the Twentieth Century Society applied for the tower to obtain listed building status with Historic England, writing that, "The market hall is of architectural interest as a well-preserved, high-quality 'festival style' building, its clock tower having landmark qualities and a strong civic presence." The Society noted that there were no listed post-war clocktowers in the north of England, as the only listed ones were in the south or midlands, and also that all other Festival of Britain towers in the country were Grade II listed. In April 2026, the Twentieth Century Society's bid to obtain listed status for the tower was rejected by Historic England, which stated that it lacked "the design quality" and "use of high-quality materials" enjoyed by comparable listed buildings, and that many of the attributes listed in the application had since been changed.
