= St Mary's Church, Bramall Lane =

St Mary's Church
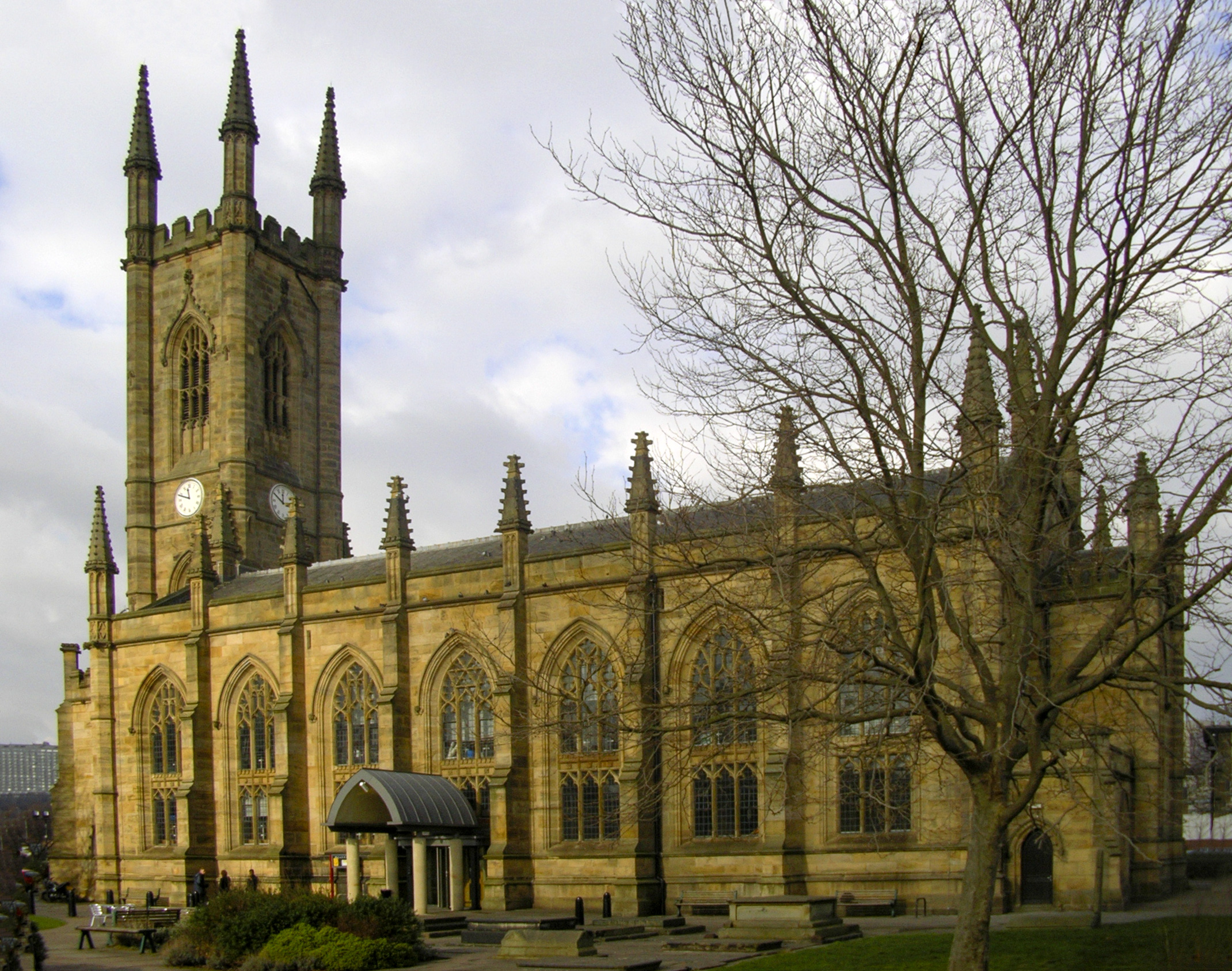
- St Mary's Church from the south

- Location within Sheffield
- 53.3722°N 1.4717°W
- OS grid reference: SK 35248 86306
- Location: Highfield, Sheffield, South Yorkshire
- Country: England
- Denomination: Church of England
- Website: www.stmarys-church.co.uk

History
- Status: Parish church
- Consecrated: 1830

Architecture
- Functional status: Active
- Architect: Joseph Potter
- Style: Gothic Revival
- Construction cost: £13,927 (equivalent to £1,320,000 in 2025)

Specifications
- Height: 140 feet (43 m)

Administration
- Province: Province of York
- Diocese: Diocese of Sheffield
- Archdeaconry: Archdeaconry of Sheffield and Rotherham
- Deanery: Ecclesall Deanery
- Parish: Sheffield St Mary Bramall Lane

Clergy
- Vicar: The Revd Claire Dawson

St Mary's Church, Bramall Lane is a Church of England parish church in the City of Sheffield, England.

== History ==
St Mary's Church is one of three churches that were built in Sheffield under the Church Building Act 1818 (the other two being St George's Church, Portobello and St Philip's Church, Netherthorpe), and is the only one still to be used as a church. The church was designed by Joseph Potter and cost £13,927 (equivalent to £1,320,000 in 2025). A grant of £13,941 was received from the Church Building Commission to cover the cost of building and other expenses. The foundation stone was laid on 12 October 1826 by the Countess of Surrey, and the church was consecrated on 21 July 1830.

The church is built in the Perpendicular style, with a 140 feet (43 m) high tower, It was damaged by bombing during the "Sheffield Blitz" and when restored was divided: the chancel and two east bays of the nave remained in use as a church, the rest of the building used as a community centre.

In 1839 some Chartists, suspicious of the big new Anglican churches, unsuccessfully attempted to fire-bomb St Mary's.

It is recorded in the National Heritage List for England as a designated grade II* listed building.

=== Present day ===
In 2000, a major internal refurbishment took place resulting in the church and community centre becoming a combined space. The space is also used to host conferences.

There are close links between the church and Sheffield United F.C., whose ground is situated on Bramall Lane. During the refurbishment in 2000, church services took place at the football club.

== See also ==
- Listed buildings in Sheffield
- List of Commissioners' churches in Yorkshire
