= Shipley Town Hall =

Municipal building in Shipley, West Yorkshire, England

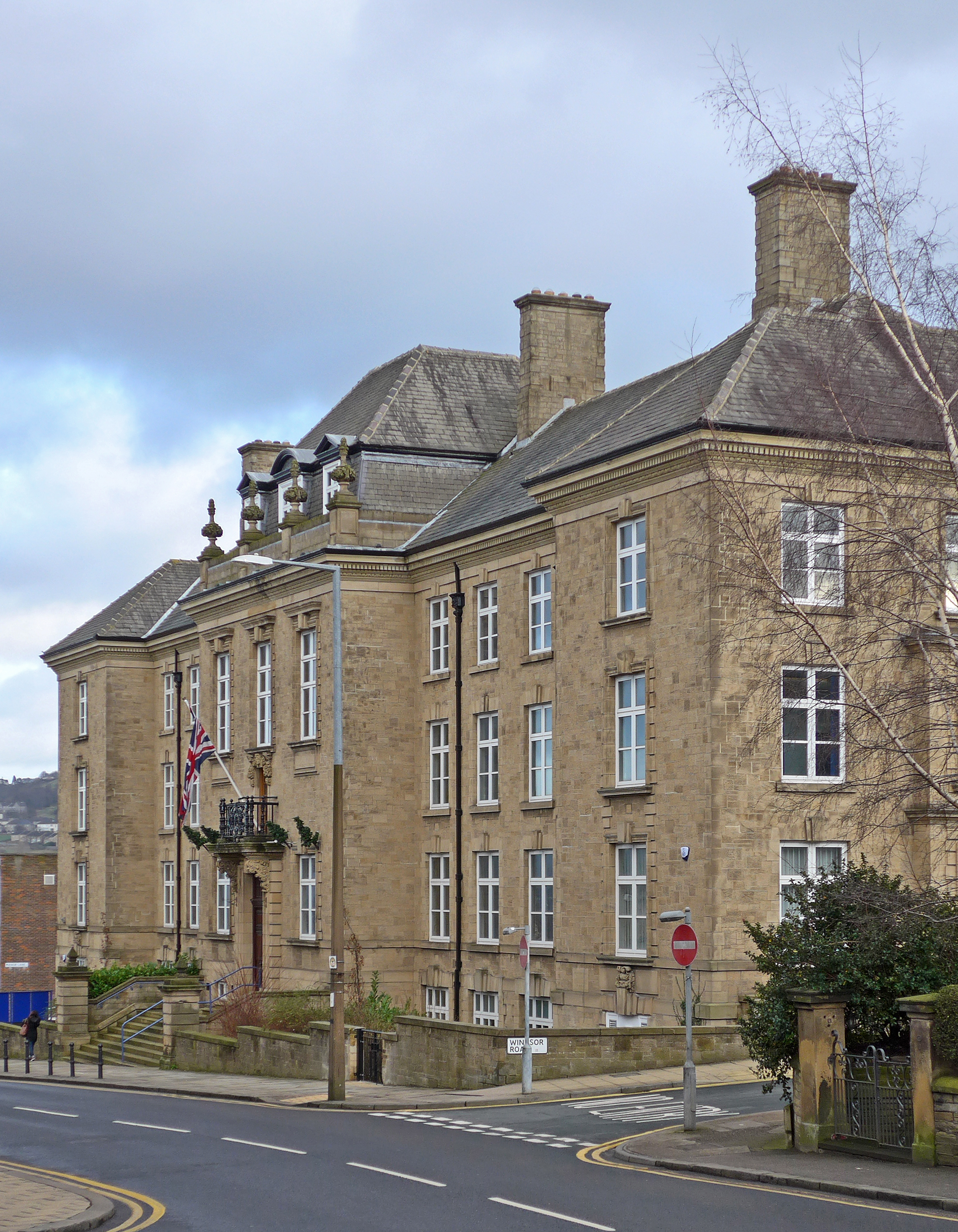
- Shipley Town Hall

- Shown in West Yorkshire
- 53.8336°N 1.7794°W
- Location: Kirkgate, Shipley

History
- Built: 1932

Site notes
- Architectural style: Neo-Georgian style

Shipley Town Hall is a municipal structure in Kirkgate in Shipley, West Yorkshire, England. It was the headquarters of Shipley Urban District Council.

== History ==
Following significant population growth, largely associated with the increasing number of worsted mills in the town, the area became an urban district in 1894. The new council initially occupied the office of the former local board of health at the Manor House, but, during the First World War, it relocated to dedicated council offices at Somerset House. In the late 1920s, in the context of high rates of unemployment during the Great Depression, civic leaders decided to create construction jobs for local people by procuring a new town hall: the site they selected had been occupied by the Manor House, which had since been demolished. (Note: The Manor House, also known as Over Hall, had been built for William Rawson in 1670. It was acquired by John Wilmer Field in 1823 and was inherited, in 1832, by his daughter, Mary Field who married William Parsons, 3rd Earl of Rosse in 1836; it then passed to Lawrence Parsons, 4th Earl of Rosse before being acquired by Sir James Roberts in 1911. The Manor House was demolished in 1915 and the council acquired the vacant site from Roberts in January 1921.)

The new building was designed in the Neo-Georgian style and was opened by the Lord Lieutenant of the West Riding of Yorkshire, the Earl of Harewood, on 2 December 1932. The earl unveiled a plaque in the entrance hall and was presented with a key decorated with the town's coat of arms in enamel. The design involved a symmetrical main frontage with thirteen bays facing onto Kirkgate with the end bays projected forward; the central section of three bays, which also projected forward, featured a flight of steps leading up to a doorway flanked by banded pilasters and brackets supporting an iron balcony which was accessed from a French door. There were three tall sash windows on the floor above and, at roof level, there were a modillioned cornice, four urns and three dormer windows. Internally, the principal room was the council chamber.

The town hall continued to serve as the headquarters of the urban district for much of the 20th century but ceased to be the local seat of government after the enlarged Bradford Council was formed in 1974. Nevertheless, Bradford Council continued to use the town hall as the local venue for meetings of groups of officers from different departments convened by an area co-ordinator. The town hall was the venue for a controversial public inquiry, from which angry protestors were excluded, into the route of a proposed Airedale Trunk Road in February 1976. The council chamber and a reception room known as the Miller Room were extensively refurbished in 1998.
