= Shipley, West Yorkshire =

Town and civil parish in West Yorkshire, England

Coordinates: 53.833°N 1.777°W

Shipley
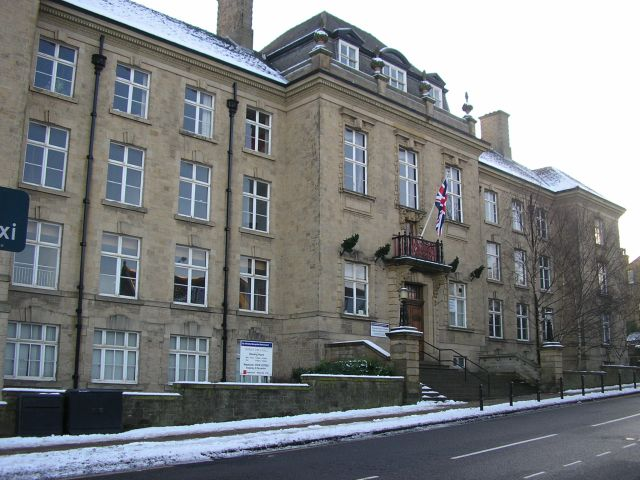
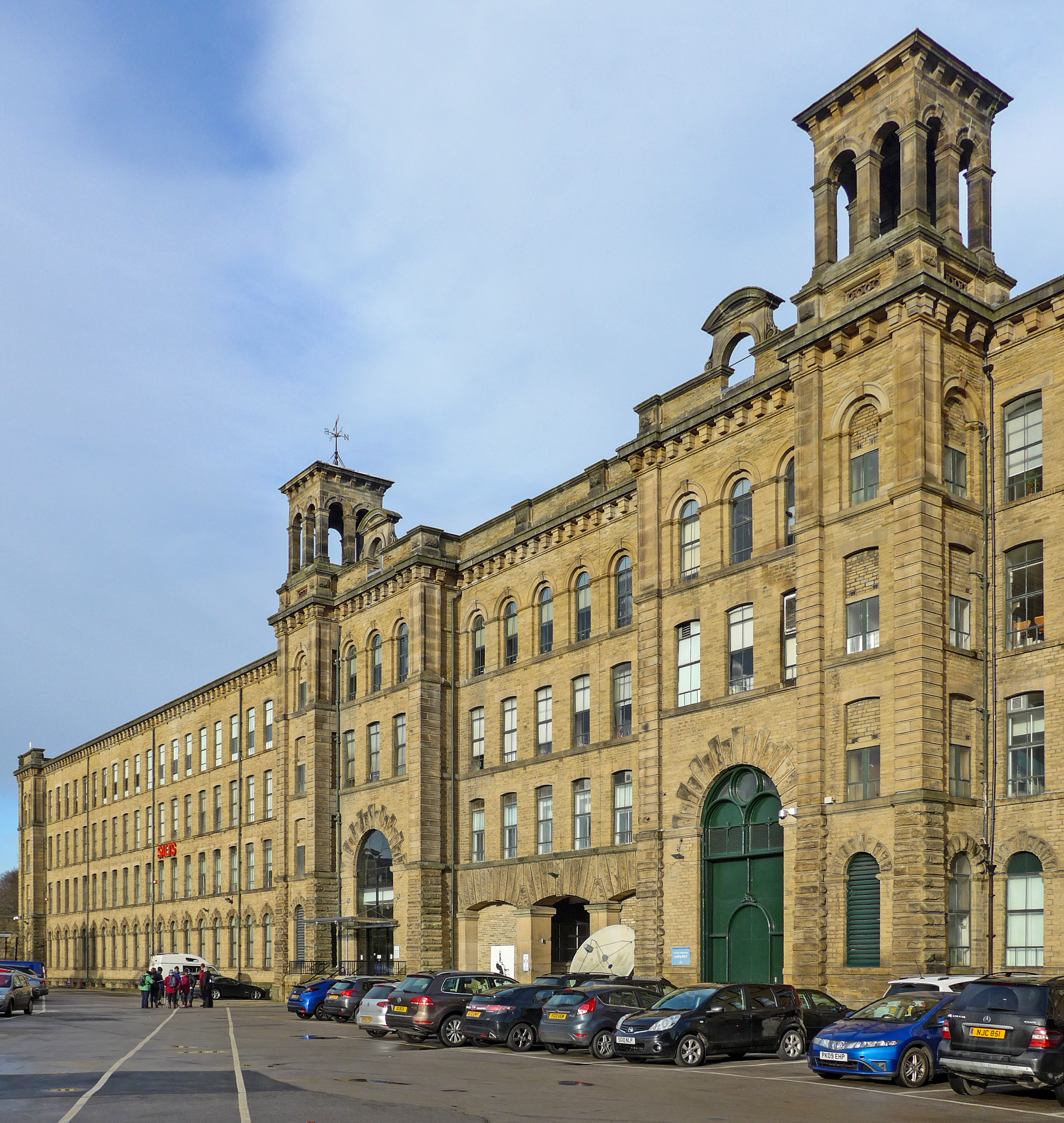
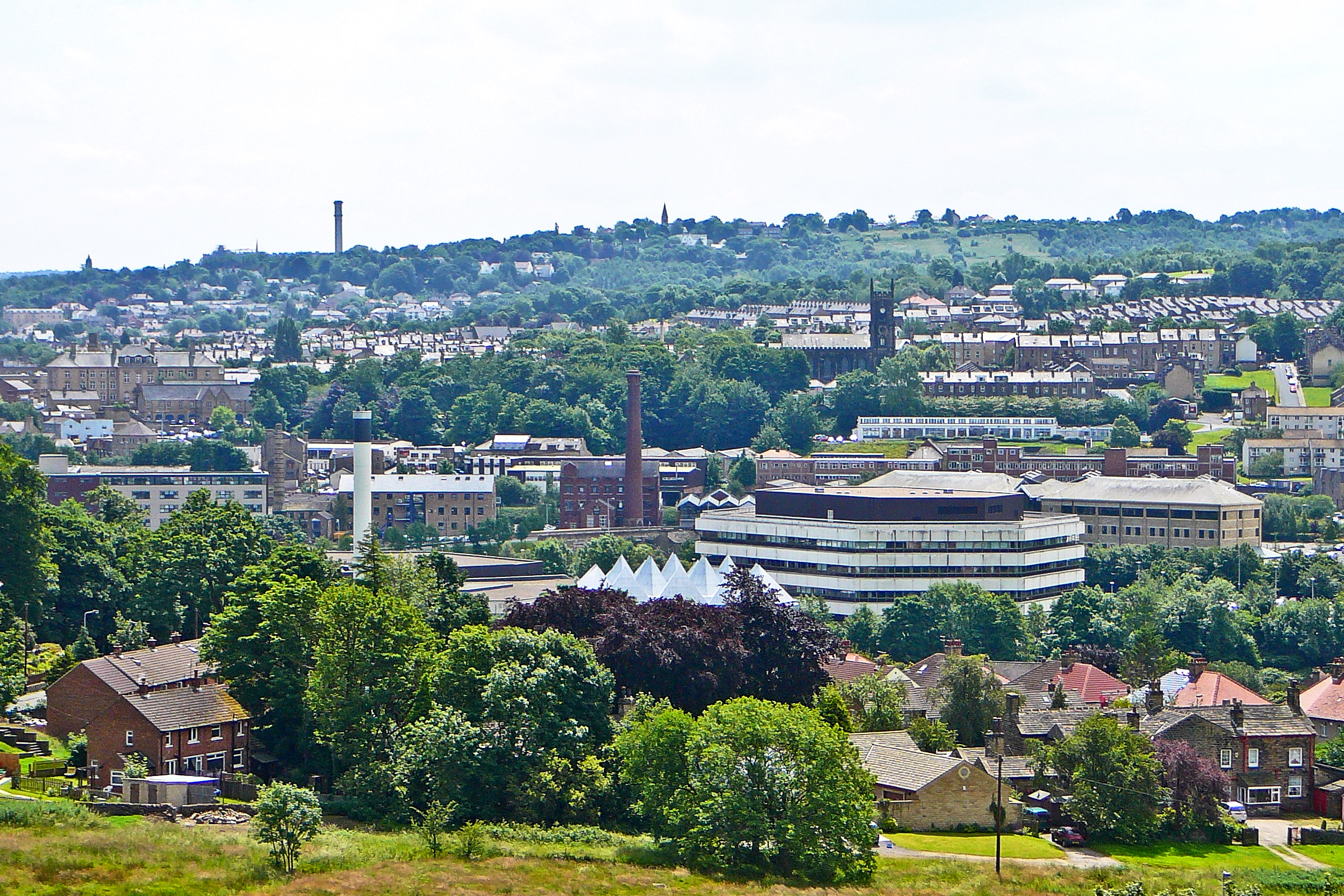
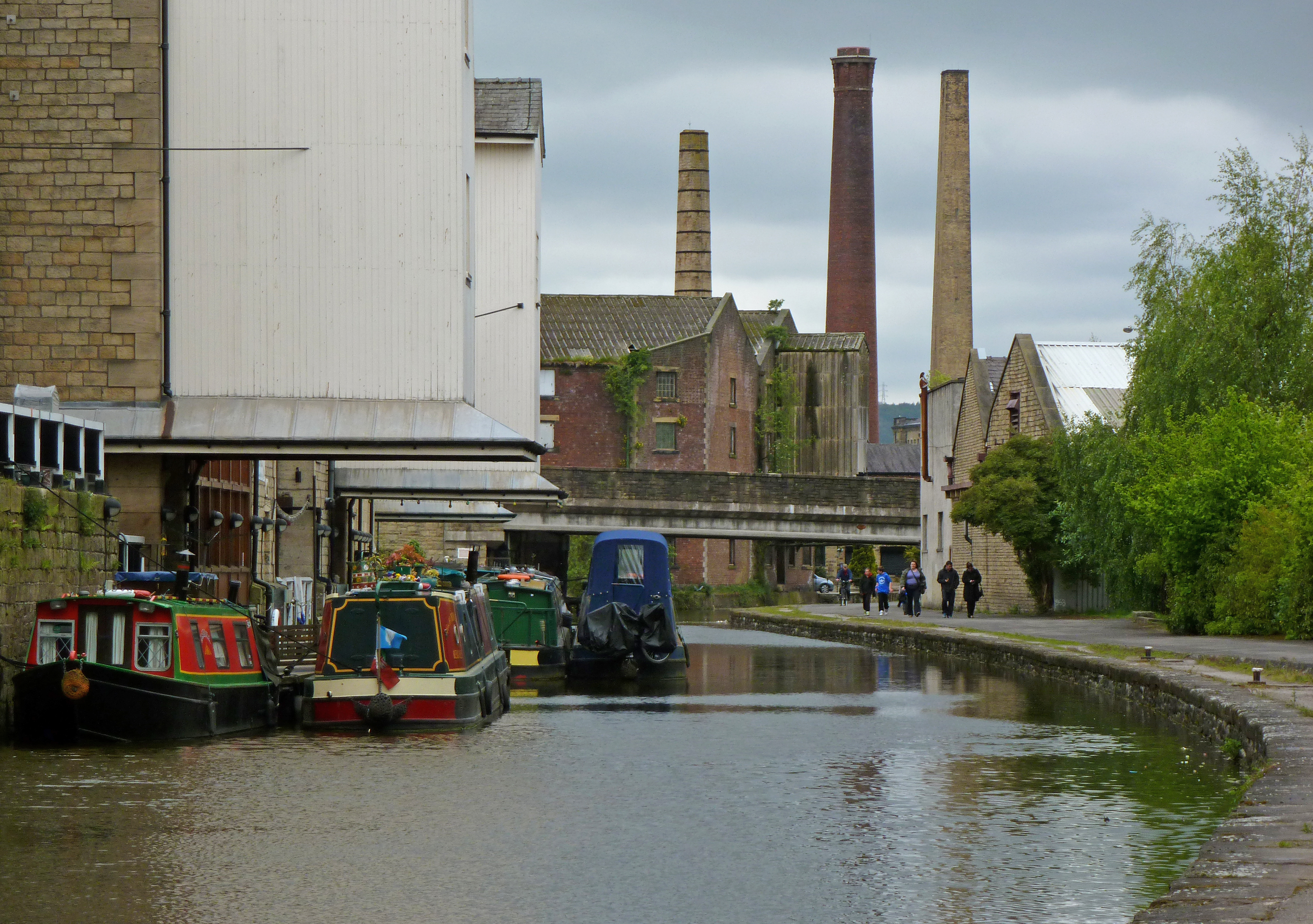
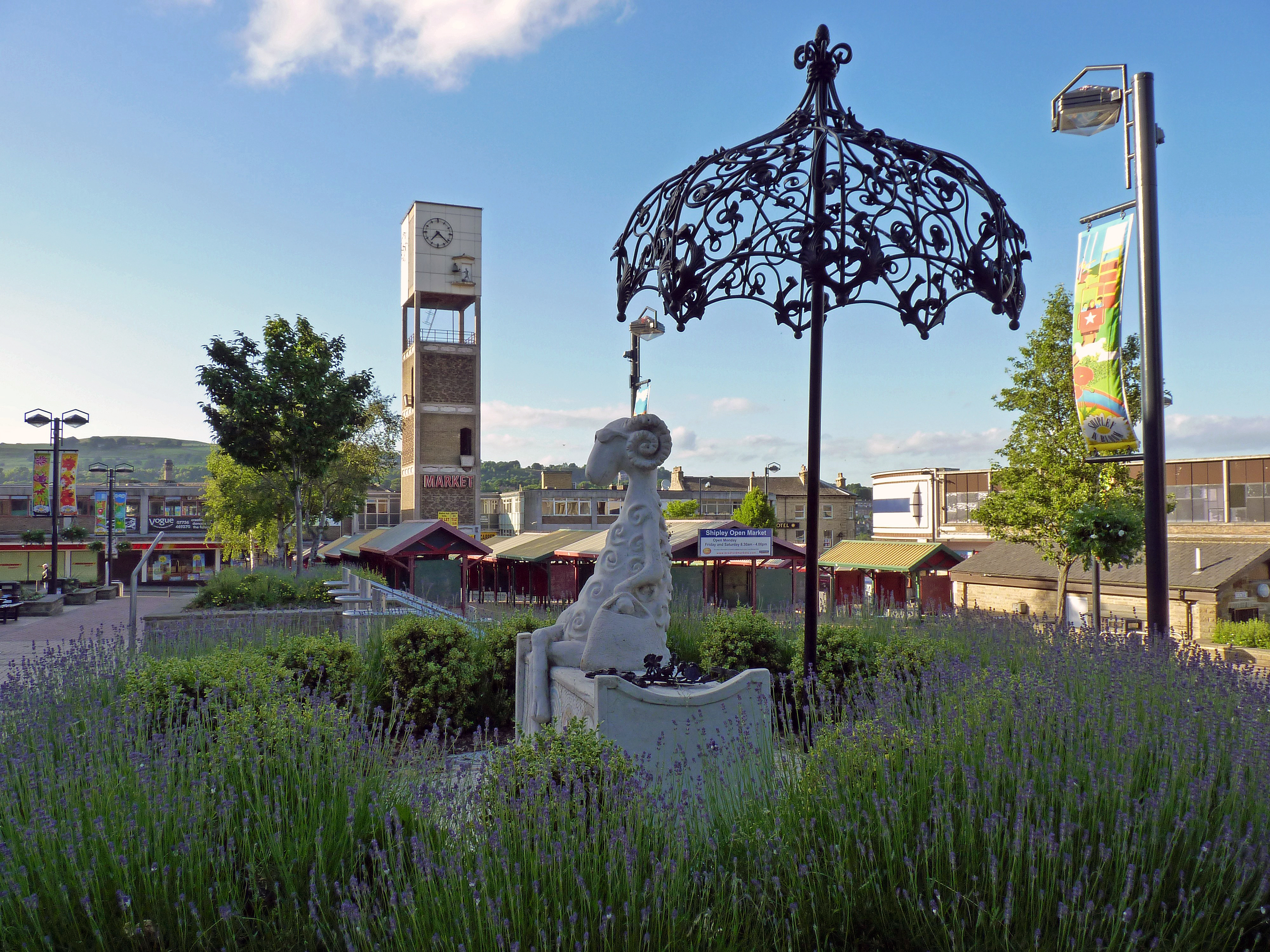
- Shipley Town Hall Salt’s Mill View of Shipley The Canal Market Square

- Location within West Yorkshire
- Population: 15,483 (ward. 2011)
- OS grid reference: SE 146 375
- Civil parish: Shipley
- Metropolitan borough: City of Bradford
- Metropolitan county: West Yorkshire
- Region: Yorkshire and the Humber
- Country: England
- Sovereign state: United Kingdom
- Post town: Shipley
- Postcode district: BD17-18
- Dialling code: 01274
- Police: West Yorkshire
- Fire: West Yorkshire
- Ambulance: Yorkshire
- UK Parliament: Shipley
- Councillors: Anna Watson (Green Party); Kevin Warnes (Green Party); Martin Love (Green Party)

Shipley is a historic market town and civil parish in the City of Bradford, West Yorkshire, England. Located on the River Aire and the Leeds and Liverpool Canal, Shipley is directly north of the city of Bradford. The population of Shipley at the 2011 Census was 15,483.

Until 1974, Shipley was an urban district in the West Riding of Yorkshire. The town forms a continuous urban area with Bradford.

== History ==
=== Toponymy ===
The place-name Shipley derives from two words: the Old English scīp ('sheep', a Northumbrian dialect form, contrasting with the Anglian dialect form scēp which underlies modern English sheep) and lēah meaning either 'a forest, wood, glade, clearing' or, later, 'a pasture, meadow'. It has therefore been variously defined as 'forest clearing used for sheep' or 'sheep field'.

=== Early history ===
Shipley appears to have first been settled in the late Bronze Age and is mentioned in the Domesday Book of 1086, in the form Scipelei(a).

Its early history relies on the records of a succession of Lords of the Manor, not all of whom were in permanent residence. The rolls of the manor court have been missing since the 18th century, leaving the records incomplete. In the 12th century, 'Adam, son of Peter', an early Lord of the manor, granted grazing and iron ore mining rights to the monks of Rievaulx Abbey. Through the Middle Ages the Lords were the 'Earls of Ormande' (sic), possibly the Irish Earls of Ormond, followed by the Gascoigne family. In 1495, Rosamund Gascoigne, a daughter of one of the William Gascoignes who held the title, married Robert Rawson, thought to be related to the Rawson family of Bradford, after whom one of the city's markets is named. Their son, William, married a cousin, Agnes Gascoigne, and through the marriage the Rawson family inherited the manor in 1570.

The Rawsons lived at Over Hall known as the Manor House, on the site of the current town hall. The manor estates extended to Northcliff, to the south of Shipley. The family had interests in Halifax and moved there in the early 18th century, retaining their Shipley estates until the last male heir died in 1745.

By the 19th century the Rawson estates and those of the Fields, another prominent land-owning family, had become the property of the Earl of Rosse who had extensive holdings in Heaton. His legacy has endured in the name of a public house on the main Bradford to Keighley road, and Rossefield School in Heaton. Of the lower orders at this time not much is known, but there was relief housing offered at the town's expense near Crowghyll.

=== Industrial Revolution ===
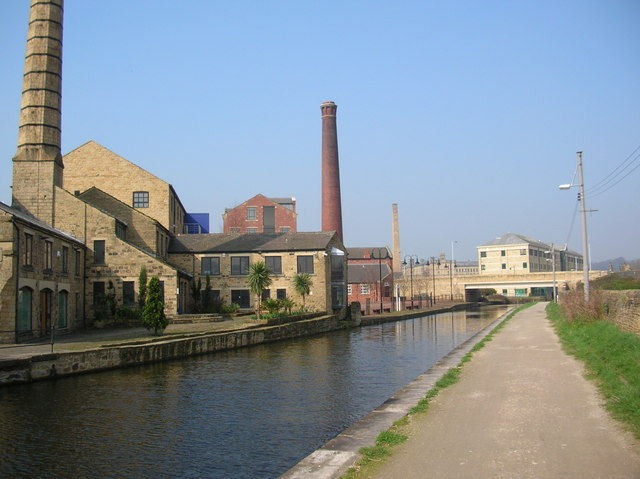
Canal-side mills, Shipley

Shipley was shaped largely by the Industrial Revolution and, in particular, the growth of the textile industry. Textile manufacture dates from pre-industrial times. As the place name indicates, Shipley had a history as sheep grazing land, so wool was plentiful, and the River Aire was a ready source of water for powering water mills and cleaning processes. There was a fulling mill in Shipley by 1500 and two more by 1559. Another mill was built by the Dixon family on the banks of the Aire in 1635. New Mill on the far side of Hirst Wood was built in the 1740s and by the late 18th century between 9,000 and 10,000 pieces of broadcloth were being fulled annually at Shipley's mills. Much work was undertaken in workers' cottages which had 'loom shops' for spinning yarn. Home workshops were once a common sight along the River Aire and often had external flights of steps. Examples can be seen in the cottages at Jane Hills along the canal in Saltaire.

The industrial era ended cottage industry. Providence Mill, one of the first steam-driven mills was built for Denby Bros. in 1796. Other spinning mills followed, including Ashley Mill, Prospect Mill, Red Beck Mill on Heaton Beck (c. 1815), Well Croft Mill (c. 1840s) and Whiting Mill on Briggate.

The smaller mills gave way to larger premises which could combine all the processes of worsted production on one site. The first was Joseph Hargreaves' Airedale Mills (demolished 1970s), Salts Mill (built in 1853, now a gallery and restaurant complex), an enlarged Well Croft Mill (demolished 1950s) and Victoria Mills, near the canal. Hargreaves employed 1,250, Salt initially 2,500, and by 1876 total employment in the mills was 6,900.

The growth in textile production stimulated the growth of associated supply industries. Other local employers included loom makers, Lee and Crabtree, WP Butterfield's galvanised containers and J. Parkinson and Sons machine tool makers.

The other major effect of industrialisation was the vast expansion in housing stock. Titus Salt's Saltaire is an example of a model village, and Hargreaves had cottages built for his workers around the town centre and his mill. He built 92 back-to-back houses along Market Street and Central Avenue in an area which came to be called Hargreaves Square or The Square. The houses were built by filling in the old courtyards. The population of the township grew from 1,214 in 1822 to just over 3,000 in 1851 to 10,000 by 1869.

It was then the landowning families—the Rosses, the Crompton-Stansfields and the Wainmans—took advantage of the demand for housing by selling their less productive land on Low Moor and High Moor. Houses for the better off were built in Sunny Bank and Hall Royd in the 1840s, 1850s and 1860s. Kirkgate was lined with villas from the 1860s, some of which still stand. Middle-class houses were built in the Nab Wood and Moorhead districts In 1870 a tranche of land in Moorhead was sold by the Countess of Rosse to build five streets of terraces. The public house on Saltaire roundabout that bears her name dates from that time.

=== Post-war redevelopment ===
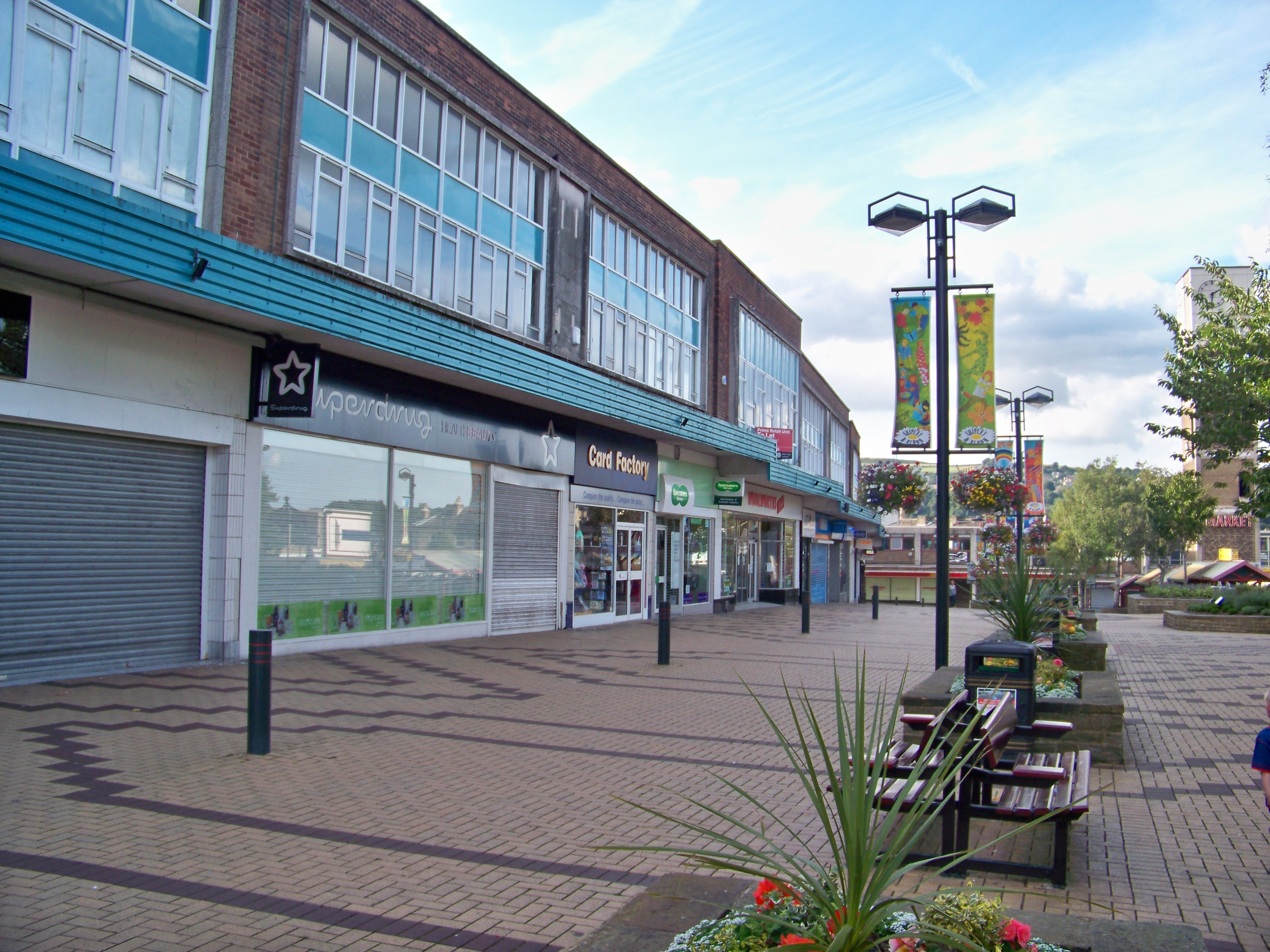
Shipley Market Place (August 2009)

The decline of the textile industry saw the demolition of many mills, only Salts Mill and Victoria Mills remain and have been converted to other uses.

Of more concern in the immediate post-war period was the deteriorating housing stock. In the 1950s, the back-to-backs of Hargreaves Square were condemned as slums and the site redeveloped. The redevelopment removed several historic buildings – Shipley Old Hall (1593), at the junction of Kirkgate and Manor Lane and of which a few fragments of roof drainage and a roof truss survive in Crowgill Park (formerly Crowghyll Park), Shipley Hall (1734), which stood at the junction of Market Street and Otley Road became the headquarters of Windhill Cooperative Society and possibly Hudson Fold House (1629). Of the major Victorian town centre buildings, only the Old Bradford Bank (now Barclays) and Sun Hotel remain. The slums were replaced with low-rise modern retail outlets, a central square serves as an outdoor market and an underground indoor market is situated beneath a tall, brutalist market hall tower which is a visible landmark for many miles around. Until recently the tower had a 'man' striking a bell to mark the hours.

A second phase of clearance in 1978 saw the construction of a library, swimming pool and health centre, with Asda added in 1985. Croft House (1729), a stone built farmhouse which was converted to a school and then subsequently used as the Labour Party headquarters, was a casualty of this development. By 1970 2,900 slum houses had been demolished.

The Otley and Leeds Roads were widened in the early 1970s, at the expense of the Fox and Hounds Hotel after which Shipley's main road junction, Fox Corner, was named.

== Geography ==
Shipley is located at an important crossing of the River Aire, where the route from Otley to Bradford crosses the route from Skipton to Leeds. It is sheltered by the millstone crags of Wrose and Windhill to the east, and to the north by Baildon and Hawksworth Moors.

Early development in Shipley was centred on the crossroads, locally known today as Fox Corner after the former Fox and Hounds pub that stood there. Here, as today, the route from Otley to Bradford crossed the route from Skipton to Leeds at an important crossing of the River Aire. The present Kirkgate and Manor Lane (then known as Sower Lane) were probably no more than tracks.

In medieval times, Shipley consisted of the settlement around the crossroads, and the unenclosed fields at Shipley Fields and the Hirst which were collectively farmed. Beyond these lay the Low Moor, which ran from the Crowghyll to the former Saltaire roundabout (now a junction on the Bradford to Keighley road), in the approximate area of modern day Wycliffe, and the wasteland of High Moor (from Saltaire roundabout, through Moorhead, as far as New Brighton and Noon Nick). These areas were steep, rocky land, unsuitable for farming. By 1600 at the latest, the open fields had been enclosed and given way to individual farms. The town was bounded to the north by the River Aire, to the east by Bradford Beck, with Cottingley and Heaton lying beyond its western and southern boundaries.

Outlying districts, such as Windhill, were not part of Shipley until the 19th century. Saltaire became part of Shipley after its foundation in the 1860s, while Windhill, which had previously been part of Idle, became part of the Shipley Urban District in 1894.

== Governance ==
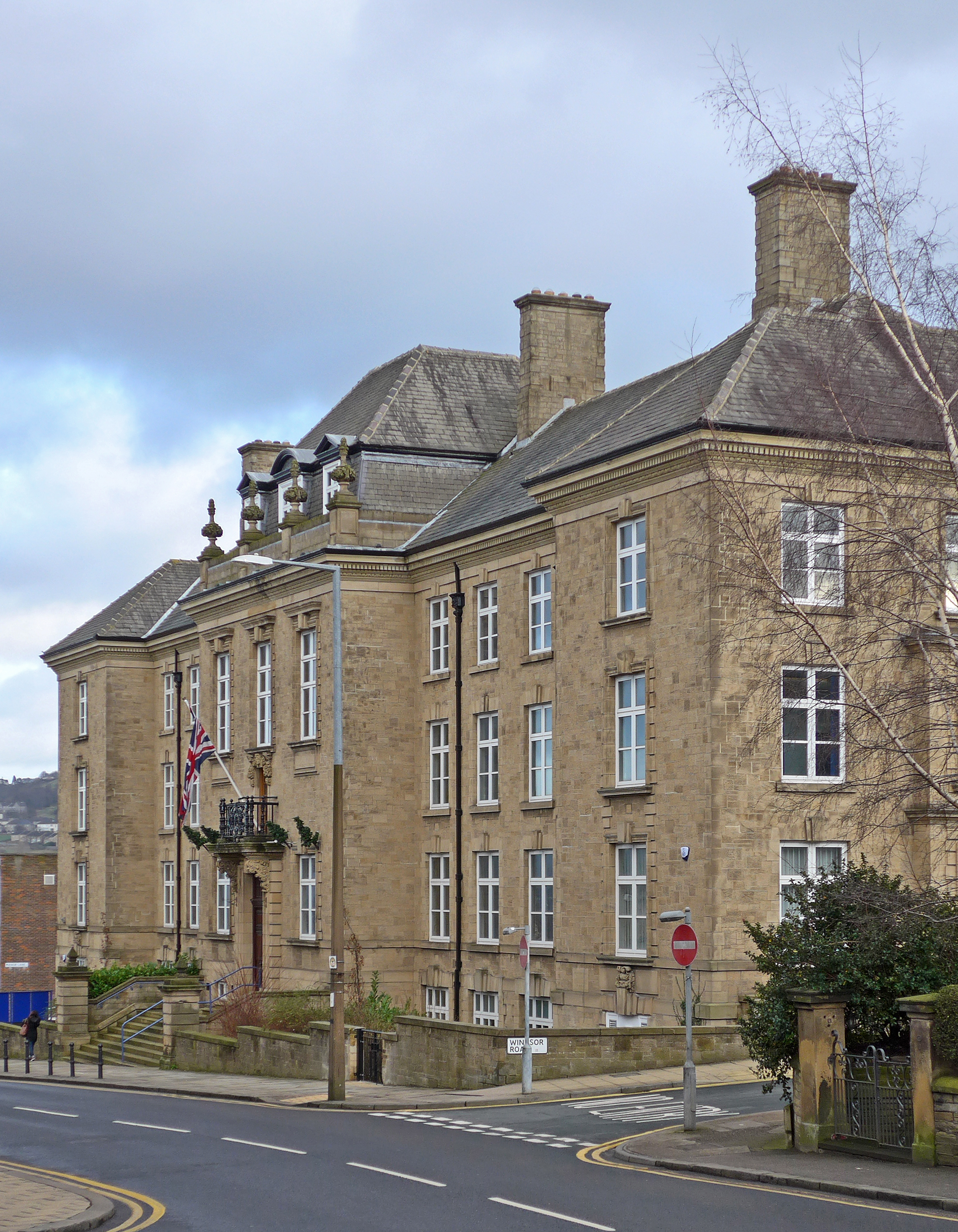
Shipley Town Hall

Shipley was historically a township and chapelry in the large ancient parish of Bradford. Shipley Local Board was formed in 1853. Originally the board met at the Sun Hotel near the market. In 1880, it moved to the old Manor House, until it was demolished in 1915. Shipley became a separate civil parish in 1866. In 1894, Shipley Urban District Council was constituted with 15 councillors, and Shipley incorporated the Windhill district, formerly part of Idle. An attempt was made to gain borough status in 1898, but failed. Shipley Town Hall was built in 1932, as part of a scheme to relieve high unemployment during the Great Depression and was opened by the Earl of Harewood. It became the seat of Shipley's administration for the next four decades.

For many years, Shipley opposed joining Bradford for local government purposes whenever it was proposed. A large protest march marked the third attempt in 1937. In 1974 after local government reorganisation, merger into Bradford seemed inevitable, and no resistance was offered.

The Shipley parliamentary constituency was created in 1885, and its first MP was Joseph Craven.

A campaign for Shipley to have a Town Council was launched in 2018, resulting in the creation of Shipley Town Council in January 2020.

Councillors

Shipley electoral ward is represented on Bradford Metropolitan District Council by three councillors; Anna Watson (Green Party), Kevin Warnes (Green Party), and Martin Love (Green Party)

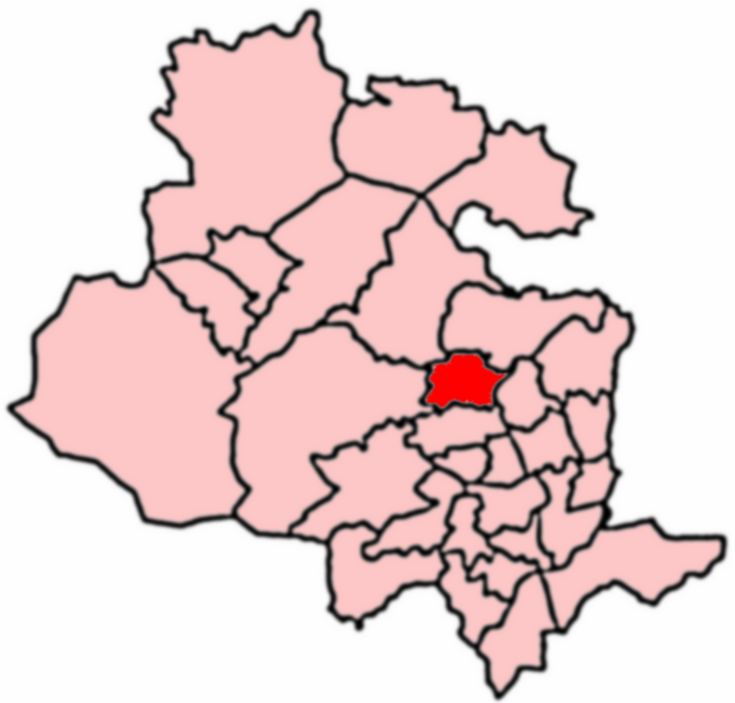
2004 Boundaries of Shipley Ward.

Election	Councillor	Councillor	Councillor
2004	Hawarun Hussain (Green)	Kevin Warnes (Green)	Martin Love (Green)
2006	Hawarun Hussain (Green)	Kevin Warnes (Green)	Martin Love (Green)
2007	Hawarun Hussain (Green)	Kevin Warnes (Green)	Martin Love (Green)
2008	Hawarun Hussain (Green)	Kevin Warnes (Green)	Martin Love (Green)
2010	Hawarun Hussain (Green)	Kevin Warnes (Green)	Martin Love (Green)
2011	Hawarun Hussain (Green)	Kevin Warnes (Green)	Martin Love (Green)
2012	Hawarun Hussain (Green)	Kevin Warnes (Green)	Martin Love (Green)
2014	Hawarun Hussain (Green)	Kevin Warnes (Green)	Martin Love (Green)
2015	Hawarun Hussain (Green)	Kevin Warnes (Green)	Martin Love (Green)
2016	Hawarun Hussain (Green)	Kevin Warnes (Green)	Martin Love (Green)
2018	Vick Jenkins (Labour)	Kevin Warnes (Green)	Martin Love (Green)
2019	Vick Jenkins (Labour)	Kevin Warnes (Green)	Martin Love (Green)
2021	Vick Jenkins (Independent)	Kevin Warnes (Green)	Martin Love (Green)
2022	Anna Watson (Green)	Kevin Warnes (Green)	Martin Love (Green)

indicates seat up for re-election.

The four wards of Shipley Town Council are represented by nine councillors with two vacancies which will be filled by September 2020.

Ward	Councillor
Saltaire and Hirstwood	Mike Connors (Chair)
Saltaire and Hirstwood	Darren Parkinson
Saltaire and Hirstwood	James Roberts
Nabwood and Moorhead	Vacant
Nabwood and Moorhead	Ros Garside
Shipley Central & Dockside	Darren Longhorn
Northcliffe and Norwoods	Dave Robison
Northcliffe and Norwoods	Jenna Spiers
Northcliffe and Norwoods	Anna Watson

== Economy ==
=== Commercial and retail ===
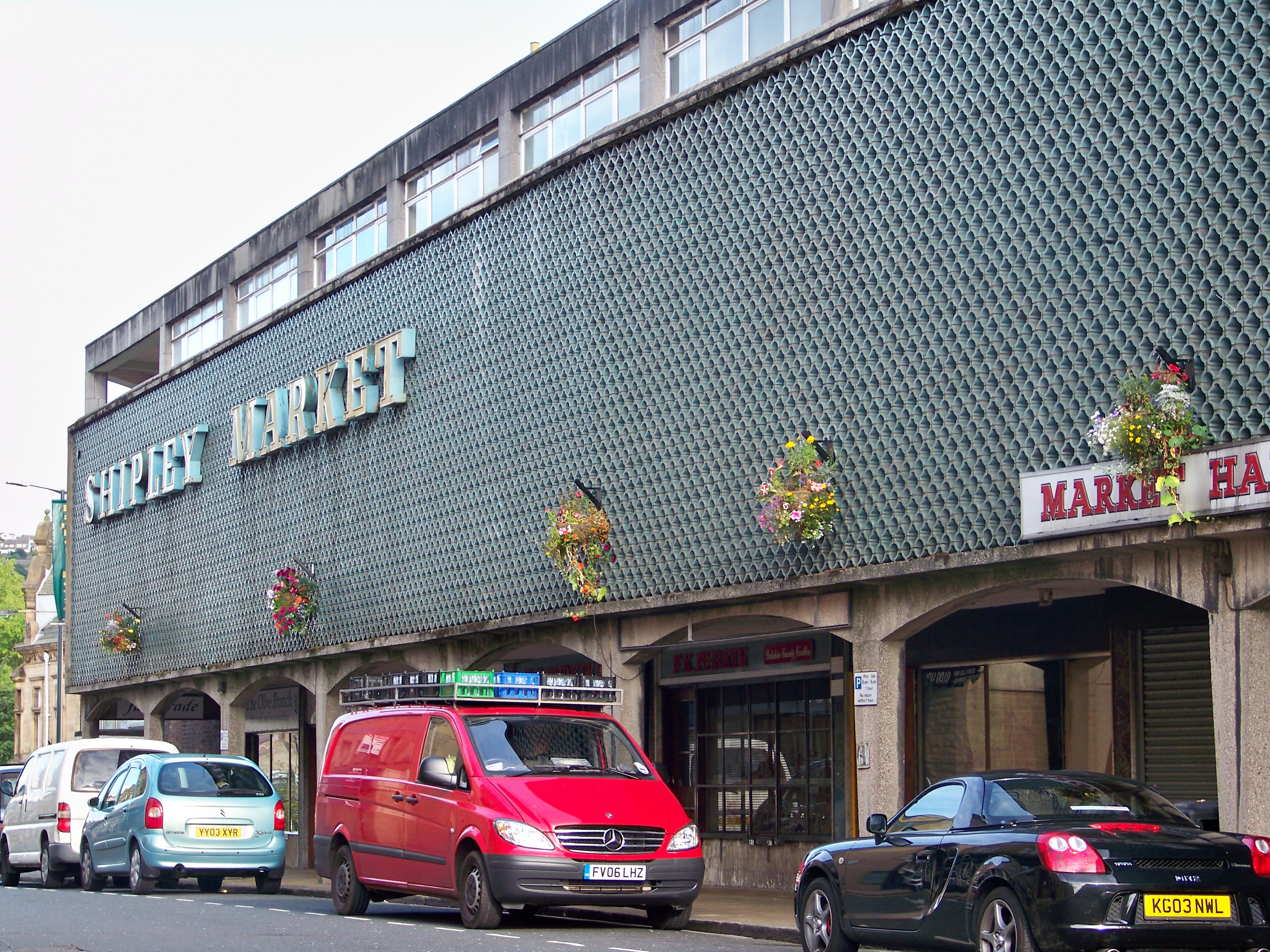
Shipley market hall

Shipley is dominantly residential in character serving as a commuter suburb of larger urban employment centres in Bradford and Leeds. Manufacturing activity includes information technology specialist ARRIS located in the Salts Mill complex. Marlin Windows, HC Slingsby and the offices of the Bradford Health Authority also feature among the larger employers in the town.

The town has one large scale supermarket, Asda in the town centre, but also supports smaller scale supermarkets and convenience shops. An open air market is a feature of the main commercial centre of the town as well as a covered market hall known for its landmark clock tower and 1960s brutalist architecture. Other shops in the same precinct include an Arndale Centre, retailers such as Boots. A pedestrian precinct with some shops and leisure businesses links Asda and its multi-storey free car park with Market Square. This area also includes the Shipley Library and the Kirkgate Centre, the town's main cultural focus offering regular a range of community activities in addition to holding cultural events such as live music, a regular alternative market and world cinema.

The town's secondary commercial centre, Gordon Terrace, part of the historic Saltaire Village development, features independent food and fashion retailers, as well as numerous restaurants and cafes. The town has a large volume of through vehicle traffic as it is on two of the main routes between Bradford, Leeds and the Aire Valley towns of Bingley, Keighley, and Skipton.

=== Visitor attractions ===
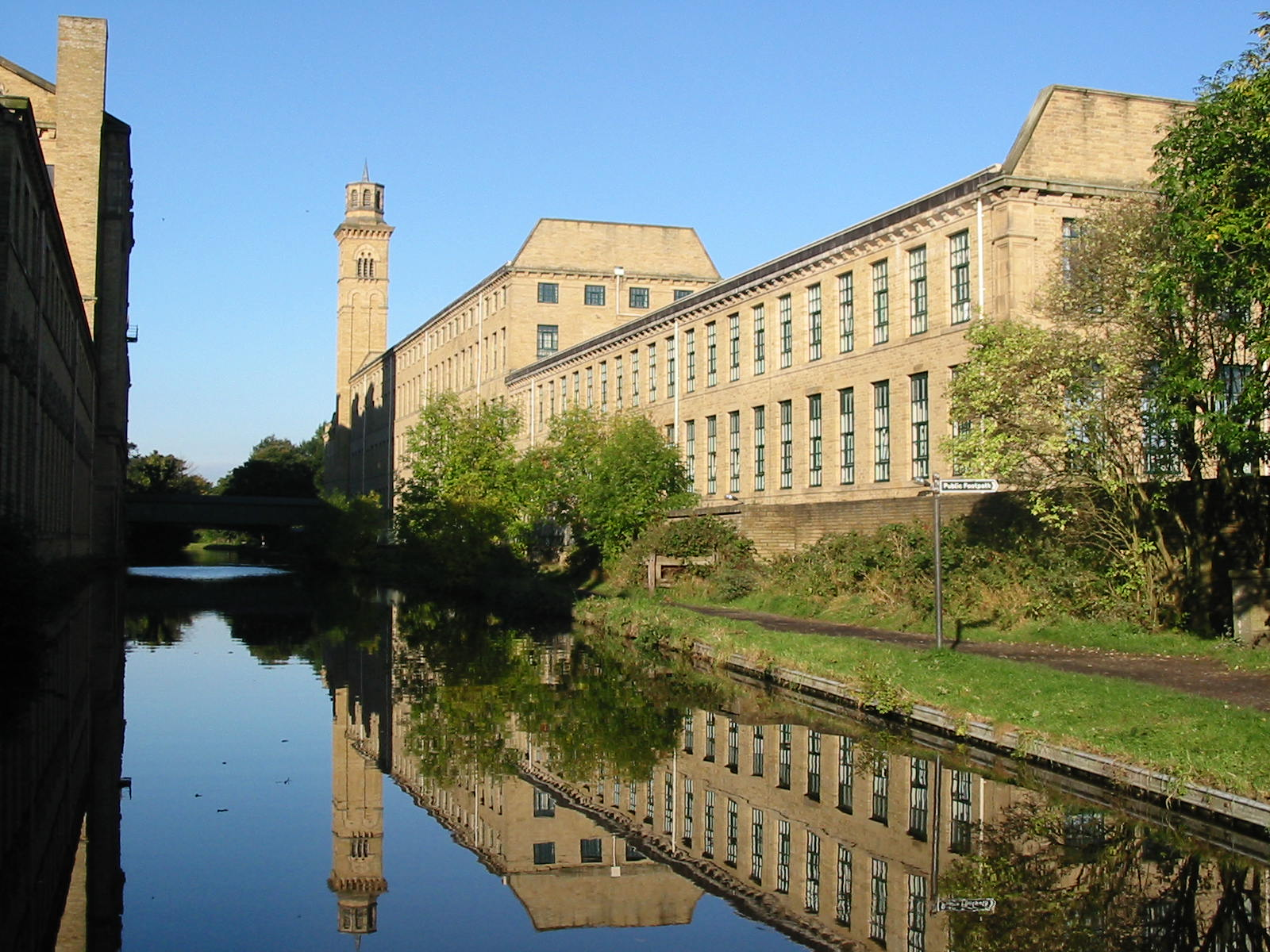
Salts Mill alongside the Leeds and Liverpool Canal

The village of Saltaire located in Shipley is a UNESCO designated World Heritage Site incorporating the Victorian era Salts Mill and associated residential district. Located by the River Aire and Leeds and Liverpool Canal the model village was planned by industrialist Sir Titus Salt as a processing facility for alpaca woollen cloth and as residential accommodation for his workforce. Salts Mill is no longer used for textile production, but now contains the 1853 Gallery, housing many works by the artist David Hockney, a variety of shops, restaurants and local businesses, including Pace Micro Technology (now Arris). Salts Mill is accessed via the nearby Saltaire railway station and together with the stone built terraced houses, ornate Victorian era civic buildings and Roberts Park, draws significant numbers of tourists to the area.

To the north across the River Aire, is Shipley Glen ("glen" refers to the little valley beneath a ridge). It has long been a popular beauty spot, and in 1895 the Shipley Glen Tramway was built to carry visitors up to the top. The tramway has weathered periods of neglect and closure, but in 2012 it ran most weekends through the summer, staffed by volunteers.

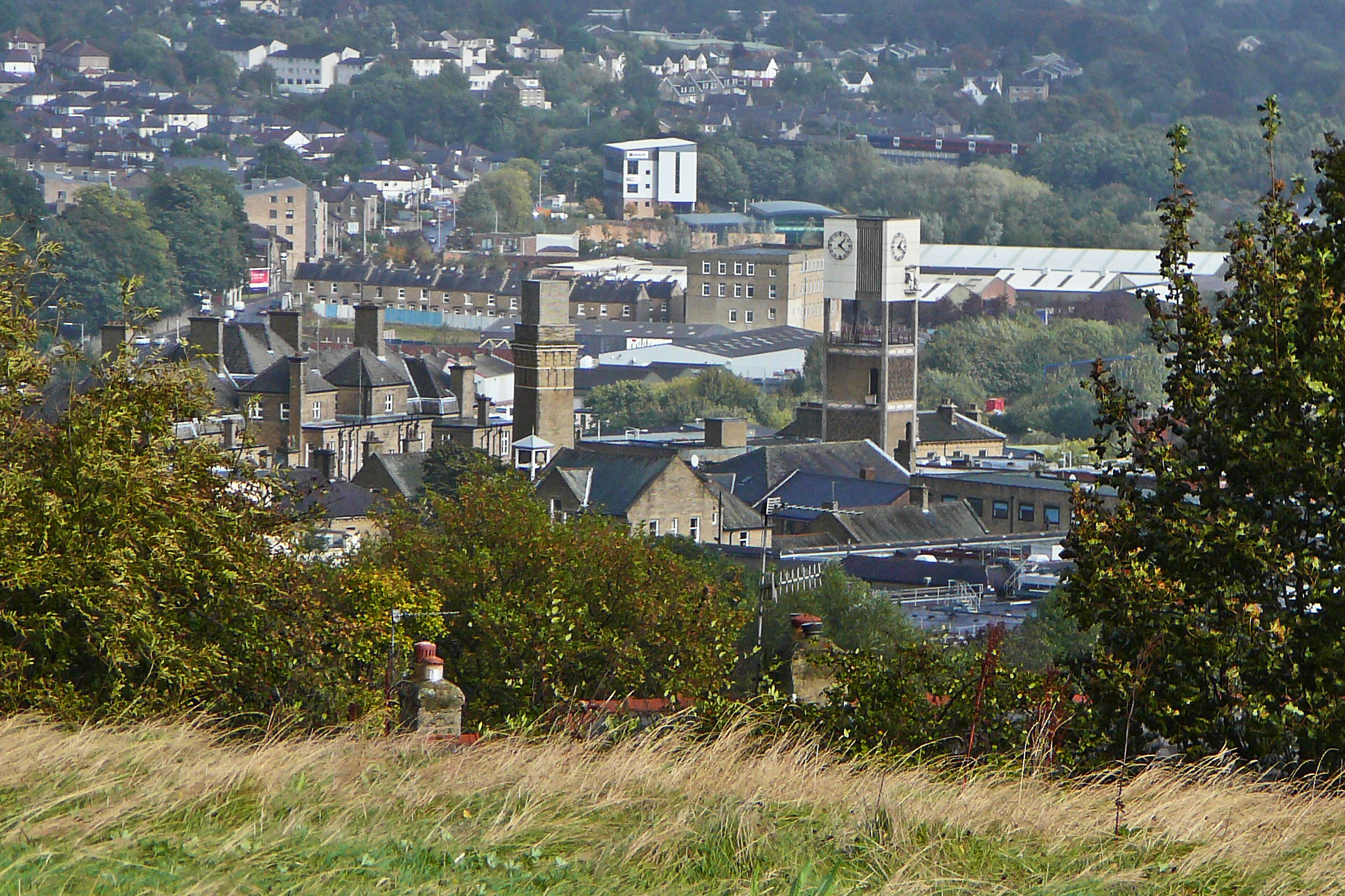
Looking over Shipley from Northcliffe

=== Parks and gardens ===
Crowghyll Park was once a quarry and the town's refuse dump. The land was given to church wardens in lieu of common rights when Shipley Common was enclosed and in 1889 it was landscaped. A public playground was opened by Mrs Titus Salt in 1890. A larger recreation area with playing fields, allotments, woods, and a private golf club is situated on the hill at Northcliffe. The woods and playing fields were opened to the public by Norman Rae MP and the playing fields are named after him. In the village of Saltaire is Roberts Park, built by Sir Titus Salt for his workers' recreation.

=== Theatre and cinema ===
The Victoria Hall in Saltaire is a concert venue, hosting bands such as Fairport Convention. However, there were once a number of entertainment establishments within the district:

- Queen's Palace – Formerly a temperance coffee house, an institution called Queens' Palace Theatre was sited on Briggate around the turn of the 20th century. It held twice nightly variety shows at 7 pm and 9 pm. In December 1915 it became Shipley Picture House and remained as a cinema until August 1932. The building was demolished following a fire in 1960.
- Glen Royal – The same fate met its successor, the Glen Royal Cinema, which was sited slightly further along Briggate. This 1,200 seat "showpiece super-cinema" opened with a showing of Emma on 5 September 1932 and was Shipley's premier cinema during the Golden Age of Hollywood. A Hammond organ was installed in 1936 and it became the first cinema in the area after the Ritz in Bradford to show 3D film. In 1963 it followed the path of many former cinemas, by becoming a casino and bingo hall, and later part of it became a snooker club. In time, it became derelict, before being destroyed by fire like its predecessor in 2013.
- Saltaire Picture House – Saltaire Picture House was on a site opposite the Old Tramshed and opened in 1922, seated 1,500. It later became the Gaumont. The cinema closed in 1957 and the building was demolished soon after.
- Pavilion – The Pavilion Cinema or Pavilion de Luxe on Commercial Street was built in 1912 and known as the 'Bug Ole' or 'Bug Run'. It opened on 2 April 1914. The small seating capacity, 630, gave rise to the motto 'the little theatre with the big reputation'. It closed in November 1956.
- Prince's Hall – Prince's Hall Cinema opened on 24 June 1911 and like the rest of Shipley's cinemas had an organ. It survived for many years, called Unit Four, with half the capacity of the old Prince's Hall It was the last remaining cinema in Shipley until it closed at the turn of the 21st century.

Shipley Film Society was established in 2010 to bring cinema back to Shipley, and runs a programme of independent and world cinema between September and May each year.

=== Libraries ===
The library on Well Croft in the town centre is a branch library of Bradford Central Library. A Carnegie Library on Briggate built with a £3,000 donation by Andrew Carnegie now stands empty but the name persists in Carnegie Drive and the Carnegie Clinic.

=== Industry ===
Shipley used to house the Naylor Cars, Ltd., that produced the Naylor TF 1700, an MG TF replica. Industrial businesses with a presence in Shipley include Denso Marsten, Manor Coatings, Produmax, Teledyne and HC Slingsby.

== Religion ==
Traditionally, non-conformist churches have predominated in Shipley and this is still the case to some extent today. There are four Methodist churches, which feature Victorian architecture. These are: Northcliffe on the site of a 'tin chapel', Crag Road, Saltaire and Christ Church at Windhill. Saltaire United Reformed Church was built in the Italianate style at the behest of Sir Titus Salt in 1859. It is a Grade I listed building.

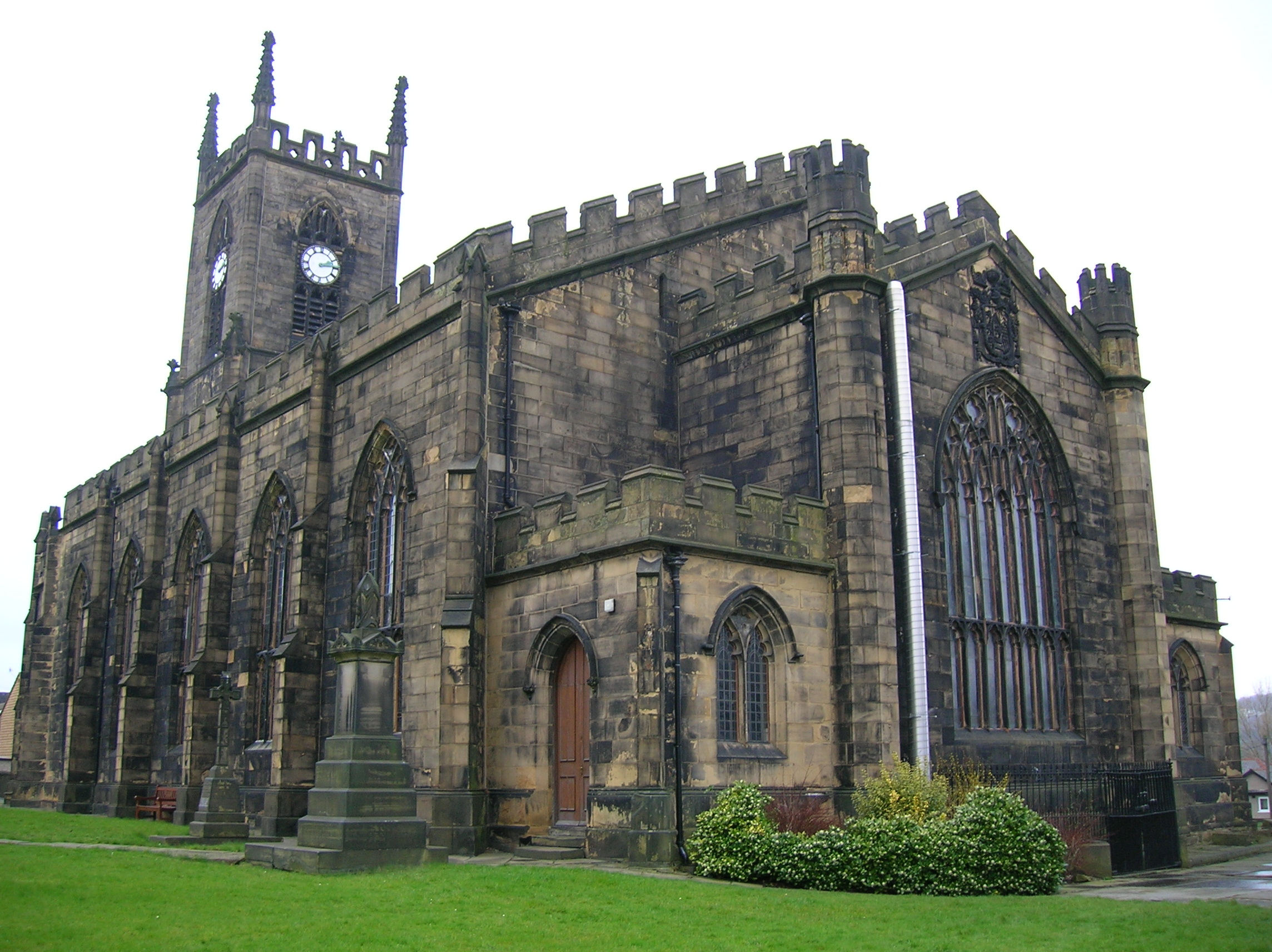
St Paul's, Shipley

The first place of worship in Shipley was the Bethel Baptist Chapel in 1758, it was rebuilt in 1836 and demolished in the early 1970s and only part of the graveyard survives. A second Baptist chapel was built at Rosse Street near the town centre in 1865 and is still in use. There is a Victorian Salvation Army Citadel on Rhodes Place.

Historically, Shipley was part of the parish of Bradford and did not have a church until well into the 19th century. The first Anglican church was the Gothic St Paul's on Kirkgate, consecrated by Edward Harcourt, Archbishop of York in 1826. It was built at a cost of £7,687.19s.3d, a gift of the nation under the Million Act, on land donated by John Wilmer Field, from the Shipley land-owning family. The parish of Shipley cum Heaton was created on 30 May 1828 by an order in council of King George IV. St Paul's is one of an identical pair of churches with Wilsden Church. A graveyard was added in 1860, but by 1895 this was full and additional land at Hirst Wood was consecrated. The church seated 1,488 and has an organ built by Binns of Bramley in 1892.

Other Anglican churches in the town are St Margaret's, Frizinghall and St Peter's in Moorhead Lane. The latter was commissioned in 1888 as a daughter church for St Paul's and consecrated in 1909 by the Bishop of Ripon. The Roman Catholic Church of St Theresa Benedicta and St Walburga, usually referred to as St Walburga's, is situated on Kirkgate.

== Transport ==
=== Road ===
The Bradford to Bingley Road was constructed in the 1820s and with Otley Road and Saltaire Road form a triangle framing Shipley centre. They connect the town to Bradford, Leeds and the Airedale towns. In September 2022, a clean air zone was launched in Bradford and Shipley. This means any non-private cars entering the city centre and the Canal Road corridor towards Shipley, will be charged dependent on the size of the vehicle and the commercial reason for entering. Exemptions apply for greener vehicles such as low-emission or electric.

There is a small bus station in Shipley Market Place.

=== Rail ===
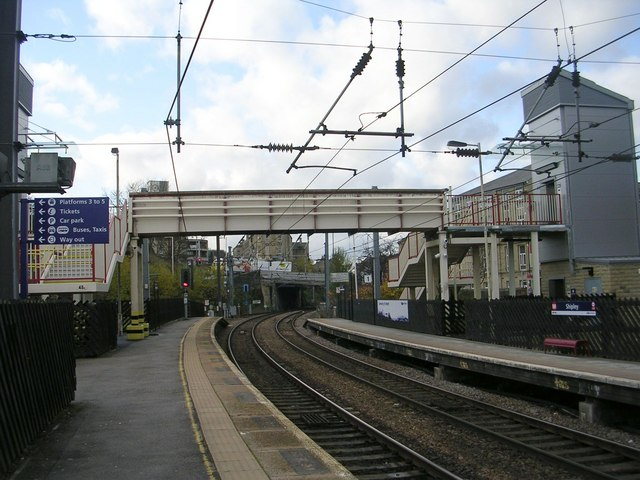
Platforms 1 and 2 at Shipley railway station

The Midland Railway's Leeds and Bradford line opened on 2 July 1846 and was extended to Keighley by March 1847. The Guiseley branch opened on 4 December 1876 and in the same year completion of the Settle-Carlisle Line put Shipley on the London to Scotland route. In 1885, the old Midland Railway station was replaced, and by 1900, 400 trains were passing through Shipley each month, carrying 50,000 passengers.

Shipley railway station has an unusual triangular layout, serving trains on the Skipton to Leeds line, the Leeds to Bradford Forster Square line, and the Bradford to Skipton/Ilkley lines. Saltaire railway station, reopened in 1984 on the Settle-Carlisle Line, serves the heritage village of Saltaire. Long-distance trains run south to London King's Cross and north to Carlisle, while local trains connect the town with Leeds, Bradford and Skipton.

=== Canals ===
The Leeds and Liverpool Canal was once an important navigation linking Shipley to the wider world. The Skipton to Shipley section was completed in 1773 and in 1774 a branch was extended to Bradford. Wharves were established on the north side of Briggate. The Bradford branch was filled in during the 1920s. The canal is used for pleasure cruising.

=== Trams ===
Trams ran along Bradford Road to the south and Saltaire Road to the north and between Baildon Bridge and the Branch. The intersection of these lines led to the main road junction of Fox's Corner being given the alternative name of Cobweb Square. The legacy of trams is the terminal building on Saltaire Roundabout, now a public house named Salt Bar & Kitchen. There was a second tram shed off the roundabout at the foot of Moorhead Lane.

Saltaire shed was converted for trolleybuses in 1939 until Bradford scrapped trolleybuses in the 1970s.

== Newspapers ==
The town's first newspaper was the Shipley Times & Express run by stationer and printer, Johnny Walker. The paper was based in premises at Shipley crossroads, and the junction was sometimes called Johnny Walker's Corner as well as Fox Corner. In 1922, Walker sold out to printer/stationer, Osbaldiston, and the building still stands under his name. The building is now a scuba diving centre called Duck and Dive. The paper closed in 1981.

Shipley is in the distribution area of the Bradford-based Telegraph & Argus. The Telegraph & Argus produced a free newspaper for the district, the Aire Valley (or Shipley) Target, which was then produced as one of four local editions of the Bradford & District Advertiser. This no longer prints.

The Saltaire Review was launched by Festival Publications in October 2014. It is published bi-monthly and covers community issues and events, with an estimated readership of over 18,000.

== Notable people ==
Notable people from Shipley, England, educated there, or otherwise associated with the town.

=== Academics ===
- Sir Douglas Mawson, born in Shipley in 1882, Australian geologist, professor at the University of Adelaide, and Antarctic expedition leader
- Joseph Wright, author of the English Dialect Dictionary and one of the earliest users of phonetic notation, was born in Thackley but grew up in Windhill (now east Shipley). He wrote A Grammar of the Dialect of Windhill.

=== Arts and entertainment ===
- Harry Bramma (1936–2026), organist and church music composer, born in Shipley.
- Helen Clare (1916–2018), singer who broadcast on BBC Radio and performed with British dance bands in the 1930s and 1940s
- Harry Corbett (1918–1989), creator of the long running Sooty glove puppet character, was born in the area.
- Laura Groves (born 1988) singer and songwriter was born in Shipley and now lives in London.
- Steven Hartley (born 1960), actor, born in Shipley
- Bryan Mosley (1931–1999), actor, known for playing Alf Roberts in Coronation Street, who was born in Leeds but lived in Shipley for many years until his death.
- Tony Richardson (1928–1991), film director was born in Shipley. He is known for directing films including, Look Back in Anger in 1959, The Entertainer in 1960, A Taste of Honey in 1961 and The Loneliness of the Long Distance Runner in 1962.
- Rebecca Storm (born 1957), musical theatre actress and singer known for her roles in Blood Brothers Evita and Les Miserables
- Marie Studholme (1872–1930), actress and singer known for her supporting and sometimes starring roles in Victorian and Edwardian musical comedy. Raised in Baildon and Shipley and educated at Salt Grammar School in Saltaire.

=== Politicians ===
- Yorkshire and the Humber MEP Richard Corbett, Deputy Leader of the Labour MEPs, lives in Shipley, originally in Saltaire, now in Wrose.
- William Wallace, Baron Wallace of Saltaire, Liberal Democrat politician and Lord in Waiting from 2010 – 2015.

=== Science ===
- Roger Burton Land, animal geneticist

=== Sport ===
- 2007 British Rally Championship Stars of the Future Rally Champion, Luke Pinder.
- Jim Laker, England spin bowler who was born in Shipley, holds the world record for the number of wickets taken by one player in a first-class cricket match: 19 out of a possible 20 (Old Trafford 1956, vs Australia). A street in the Moorhead district of Shipley has been named Jim Laker Place in his memory and a blue plaque on the house he was born in on Norwood Road.
- Multiple Isle of Man TT winners, Nick Jefferies, Tony Jefferies and Tony's son David Jefferies.

=== Writers and journalists ===
- Poet and writer Nick Toczek
- Daily Telegraph columnist Michael Wharton.
- Writer Leo Walmsley

=== Criminals ===
- Peter Sutcliffe (1946-2020), serial killer dubbed in press as the 'Yorkshire Ripper'.

== See also ==
- Bracken Hall Countryside Centre and Museum
- Saltaire United Reformed Church
- Shipley College
- Esholt
- Airedale line
- Frizinghall railway station

== Bibliography ==
- Burrows, Dorothy (c. 1986). Shipley – a look at the past. Stanningley, Pudsey: Allanwood Press. ISBN 0-948423-01-3.
- The Edinburgh Gazetteer, or, Geographical Dictionary. Vol. 5. Edinburgh, Scotland: Archibald Constable & Co. 1822.
- Firth, Gary (1996). Shipley and Windhill. Stroud, Gloucestershire: Chalford. ISBN 0-7524-0615-9.
- Sheeran, George (1984). Village to Mill Town: Shipley and its Society 1600–1870. Bradford: Bradford Libraries.
- Shipley Fowk Talking. Shipley, West Yorkshire: Shipley Community History Group. 1986.
- Watson, Ian (1989). In The Shadow Of The Rosse. Shipley, West Yorkshire: Shipley and District Local History Society.
