= John Oates (architect) =

English architect

John Oates (1793–1831) was an English architect born in Salterhebble, near Halifax, West Yorkshire. He was noted in Manchester in 1813, and it is thought that this is where he trained.

He was responsible for several churches and other buildings in Huddersfield and the surrounding areas, including All Saints church at Paddock where he was interred upon his death in 1831.

The inscription upon his headstone reads:

Here lie the remains of John Oates of Springwood, Architect, who died 16 May 1831 in the 37th year of his age.

In private life he was a kind husband an affectionate father and a sincere friend.

Under his superintendence the Infirmary and St Paul's Church, Huddersfield and this adjoining church were built.

Buildings include:

Christ Church, Sowerby Bridge, 1819, St Paul's church, Shipley, 1825; St John's church, Bishop Thornton, 1825 (partly demolished); Lockwood Spa Baths, 1827; Huddersfield Infirmary, 1829; Holy Trinity church, Idle, 1830; Former All Saints Church, Paddock, 1830; Christ Church, High Harrogate, 1831, St Paul's Church, Huddersfield, 1831.
