= Church of St Paul, Shipley =

Anglican church in West Yorkshire, England

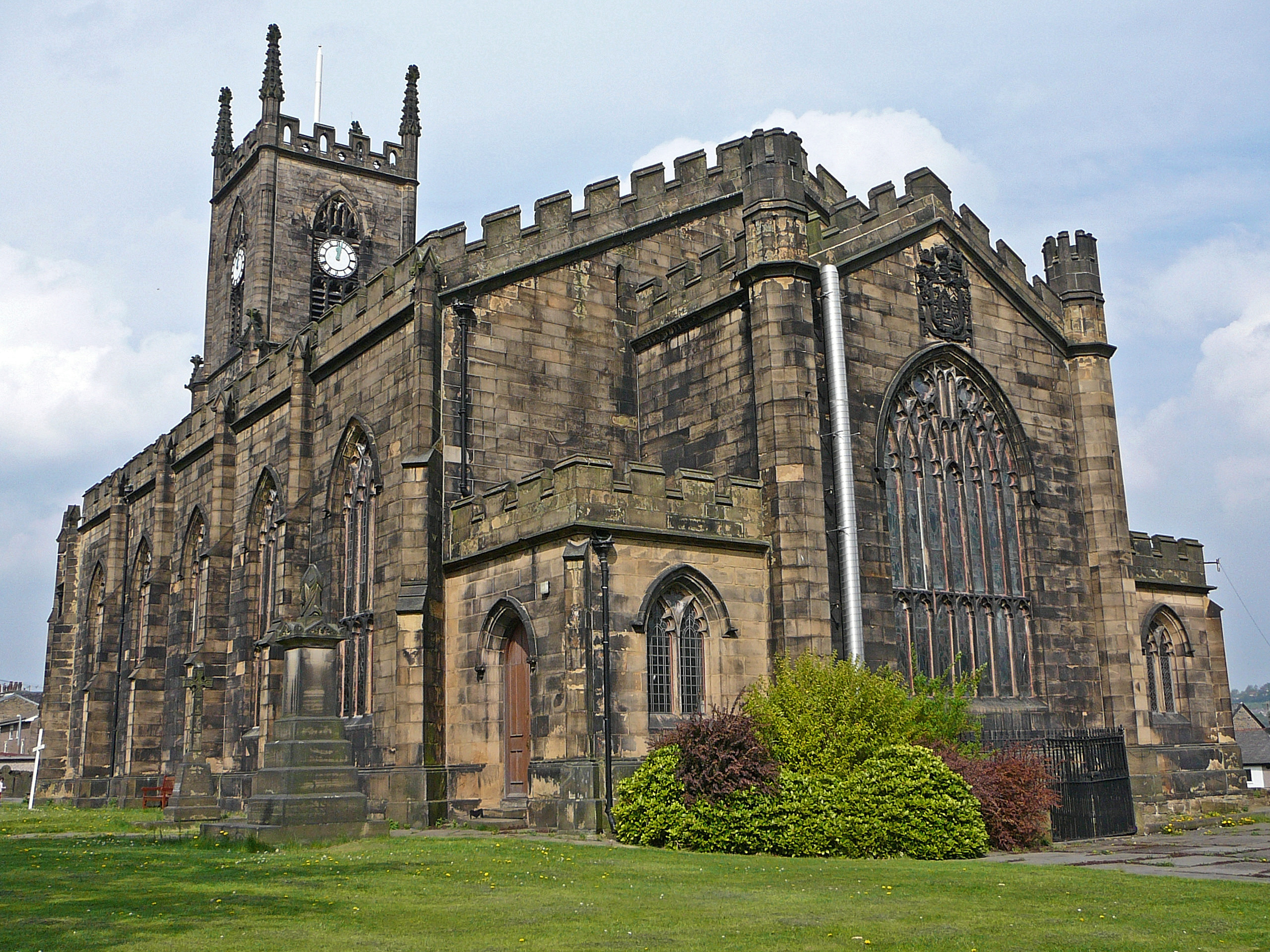
- Church of St Paul, Shipley
- Church of St Paul, Shipley
- 53.8339°N 1.7826°W
- OS grid reference: SE143375
- Location: Shipley, West Yorkshire
- Country: England
- Denomination: Church of England
- Website: Church website

History
- Status: Active
- Dedication: St Paul
- Consecrated: 1 November 1826

Architecture
- Functional status: Parish church
- Architect: John Oates
- Style: Perpendicular
- Years built: 1823–1826
- Groundbreaking: 5 November 1823

Specifications
- Capacity: 1,488 (when built)

Administration
- Diocese: Diocese of Leeds
- Archdeaconry: Bradford
- Deanery: Aire and Worth
- Benefice: Shipley St Paul
- Parish: Shipley

Clergy
- Vicar: Henriette Howarth

Listed Building – Grade II
- Designated: 24 June 1976
- Reference no.: 1133546

The Church of St Paul, Shipley is a parish church in the town of Shipley, West Yorkshire, England. It is the only Anglican church in the benefice of Shipley St Paul. Prior to a church being built in the town, worshippers were expected to go to the Church of St Peter in Bradford. The church was opened in 1826, and consecrated in November of the same year. It is now a grade II listed structure. It was the only Anglican church in the town until a new parish of St Peter was created in 1910.

== History ==
The settlement of Shipley was only a small village at the turn of the 19th century with a population of 2000, and there being no Anglican church, worshippers were expected to go to the Church of St Peter in Bradford on foot or horseback as Shipley was in the Parish of Bradford. Initially, the church and the funds for it were approved under the Church Building Act 1818 (58 Geo. 3. c. 45), with a projected cost of £7,961, but with alterations, it actually cost in the region of £12,000 (equivalent to £970,000 in 2025) by 1825/1826. The five-year interval between the church being authorised in 1818 and the foundation stone being laid in 1823, made the church one of the last to be built under that Act of Parliament. The Church of St Paul was designed by John Oates, and built between 1823 and 1826, with the foundation stone being laid on 5 November 1823. The Church of St Matthew in Wilsden, built in 1826, and demolished in 1962, was identical to St Pauls in Shipley being designed by the same architect.

The church is in the Perpendicular style, which was fashionable at the time, and was provided with 1,488 seats, of which 332 were free seats. A survey conducted by Bishop Bickersteth in 1858 showed a return stating St Paul's had a total of 1,460 seats, of which 640 were free, but Shipley was one of the larger churches in the region, and even though the charge for a pew was 21 shillings per year, this still generated an income of £80 per annum. The church has a west tower with eight bells, a nave, a shorter and lower level chancel and two west porches. Each side of the tower has a clock face, but the east facing clock is 12 feet (3.7 m), whereas the other three sides are all 9 feet 9 inches (2.97 m). The tower is square with three stages and a doorway on the west side.

The 1-acre (0.40 ha) of land made available for the construction of the church was donated by a local landowner, and the stone for its construction came from local quarries. The land had been enclosed only in 1815, and up until the act on enclosure, it was a tract of moorland stretching out towards what is now Cottingley. When the church was built, the adjacent road was called Moor Lane or Church Road, but at some point, the name was changed to Kirkgate. The stained glass window in the chancel was completed in 1860, when the final seven panels, which were vacant previous to 1860, were installed showing several saints below those of Jesus and other saints. The work was undertaken by Francis Barnett of Leith at a cost of £300.

The first organ in the church was fitted in 1829, but the current one was installed in 1892, being built by J. Binns of Bramley, Leeds. The organ is recognised as being of national interest, and is registered by the British Institute of Organ Studies (BIOS) with a grade II certificate. The bells and clock were restored in 1912, and an opening ceremony was performed by the Bishop of Knaresborough. The bells have been described as being "..a splendid peal of musical bells, whose mellow tones are heard to great advantage..." The Ring O' Bells public house at the western end of Kirkgate is so named on account of it being in a place to adequately hear the bells of the church. A listing from 1879 describes eight bells, with the tenor bell weighing 15 long tons (15 t).

The church was renovated in the 1870s when a pulpit was added and some of the pews removed. It was renovated again in 1970 when toilets and a kitchen were added. National Lottery funding paid for repairs to the south slope and the north slope of the nave in 2015 and 2018 respectively. The church was grade II listed in 1976.

== Churchyard ==
In the 1950s, gravestones in the uppermost original graveyard were taken down and laid around the church providing pathways. Some of the graves in the lower graveyard were also taken down, but the inscriptions were recorded. Two of the graves are registered with the Commonwealth War Graves Commission (CWGC). The gates and gate piers which face onto Kirkgate are grade II listed.

A separate burial ground at Hirst Wood (53.835°N 1.804°W) was consecrated in 1895, and was considered an extension of St Paul's graveyard.

== Parish and benefice ==
The church is the parish church for St Pauls, Shipley, and is the only named church within the Benefice of St Paul's, Shipley. Shipley St Paul's is one of 598 parishes in the Diocese of Leeds. Historically, the parish was created as Shipley-cum-Heaton, but Heaton was created as an ecclesiastical parish in 1865, and another parish, Shipley St Peter, was created in 1910. In 1983, the parishes of Shipley and Frizinghall were united as one benefice, however, this was rescinded in 1998 when the parishes separated.

When the parish of St Pauls was created, it was in the Diocese of York. It moved into the Archdeaconry of Craven and the Diocese of Ripon in 1836, and then into the newly-created Diocese of Bradford in 1919. By 2014, when diocesan reform took place in Yorkshire, it was moved into the Diocese of Leeds.

== Clergy ==
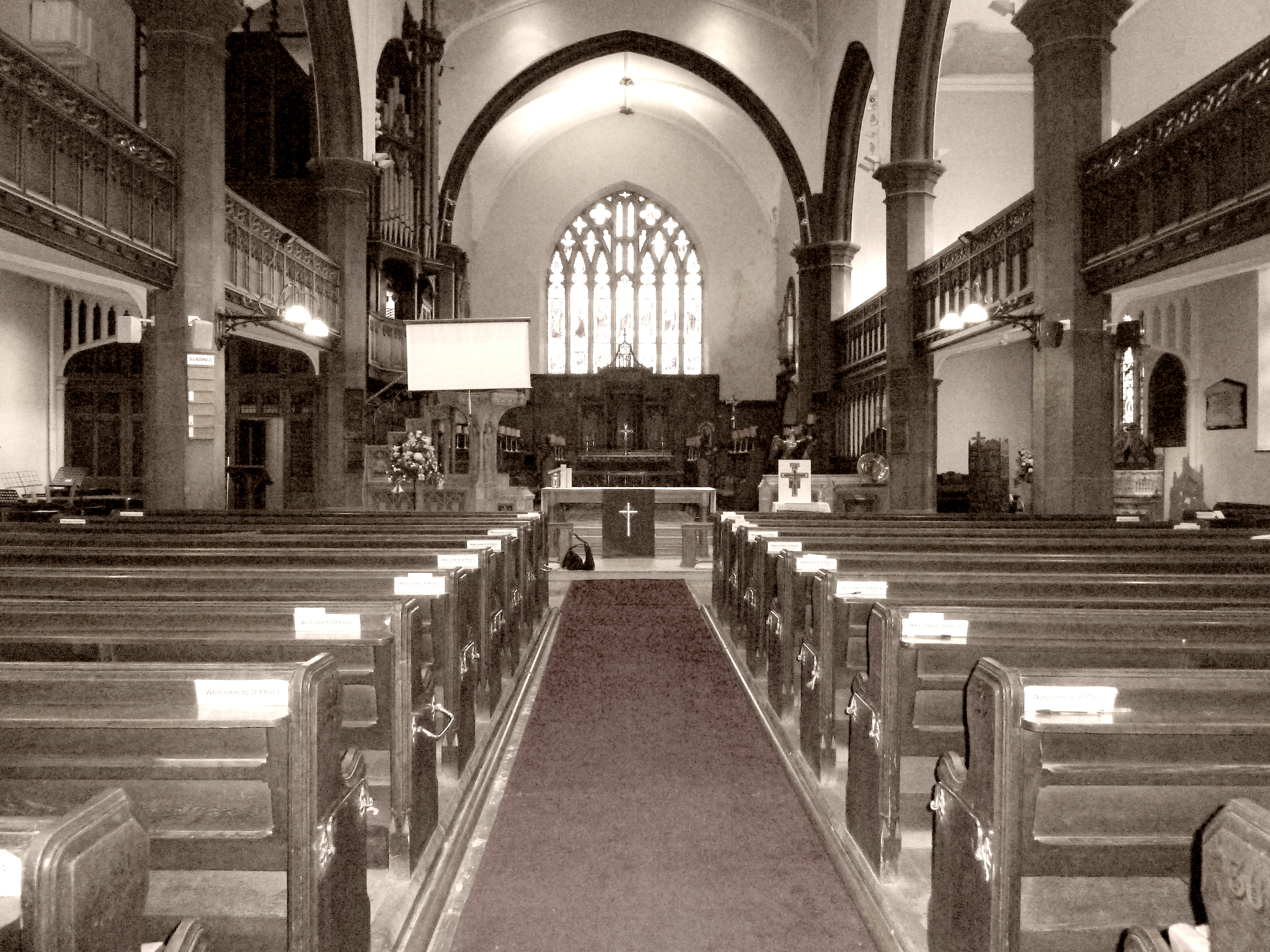
Interior of church

Vicars of St Pauls
Year	Incumbent	Year	Incumbent
1828	Richard Horsfall ♦	1936	William John Perrett
1828	Thomas Newberry	1954	John Keys Fraser
1845	William Kelly †	1964	Philip Harry Green
1884	William Pearson	1978	John Richard Henson
1890	Arthur William Cribb	1992	John R. Poole
1914	Bernard Herklots	1997	Colin R. Penfold
1918	Noel Harding Jolly	2008	Susan M. Hope
1930	Evan Basil Alban	2017	Henriette Howarth

- ♦ Interim vicar until the first appointed vicar took up their post
- † Died in office

All are listed as reverend, apart from Susan Hope who was a reverend canon. Some vicars later became canons, but all were reverends during their tenure at Shipley apart from Hope. Although the church was consecrated in November 1826, the first vicar was not appointed until 1828 as a parish council had not been convened. In the interim, the Reverend Richard Horsfall officiated until Thomas Newberry arrived in 1828. Howarth's appointment in 2017 was made after the choir had made a musical video appeal for a new vicar.
