= Baildon =

Town and civil parish in West Yorkshire, England

Coordinates: 53.851°N 1.763°W

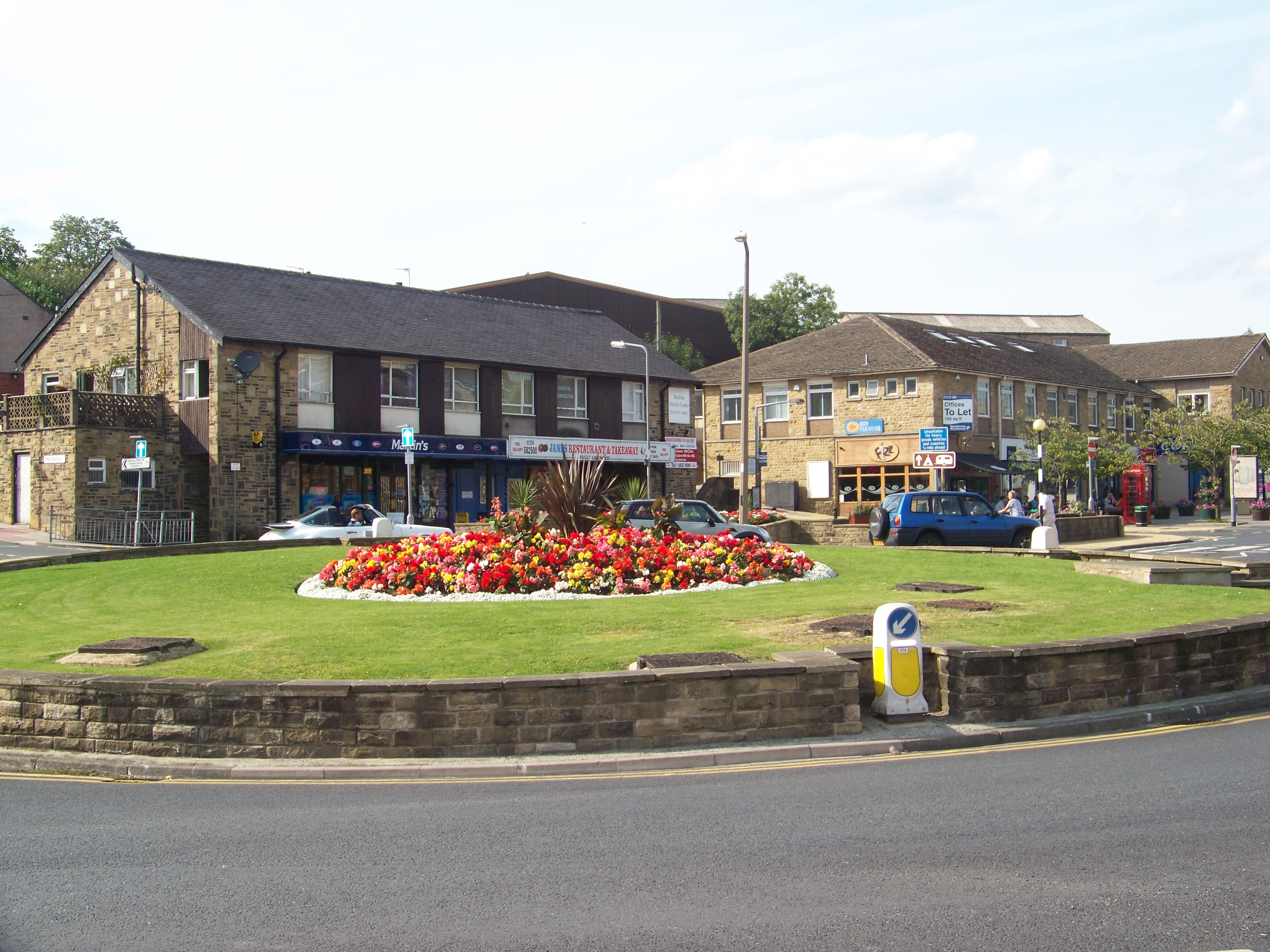
- Baildon, Browgate roundabout

- Location within West Yorkshire
- Population: 15,360
- OS grid reference: SE155395
  - London: 185 mi (298 km) south-east
- Civil parish: Baildon
- Metropolitan borough: City of Bradford
- Metropolitan county: West Yorkshire
- Region: Yorkshire and the Humber
- Country: England
- Sovereign state: United Kingdom
- Post town: SHIPLEY
- Postcode district: BD17
- Dialling code: 01274
- Police: West Yorkshire
- Fire: West Yorkshire
- Ambulance: Yorkshire
- UK Parliament: Shipley
- Councillors: Debbie Davies (Conservative); Mike Pollard (Conservative); Valerie Townend (Conservative)

Baildon is a town and civil parish in the Bradford Metropolitan Borough in West Yorkshire, England and within the historic boundaries of the West Riding of Yorkshire.

It lies 3 miles (5 km) north of Bradford city centre. The town forms a continuous urban area with Shipley and Bradford, and is part of the West Yorkshire Built-up Area. Other nearby suburbs include Shipley to the south and Saltaire to the west. As of the 2011 census, the Baildon ward had a population of 15,360.

== History ==
Cup-and-ring stones on Baildon Moor have shown evidence of Bronze Age inhabitation.

Baildon Moor has a number of gritstone outcrops with numerous prehistoric cup and ring marks. A denuded and mutilated bank represents the remains of an Iron Age settlement known as Soldier's Trench, sometimes mistaken for a Bronze Age stone circle. A Bronze Age cup-marked rock is incorporated in the bank.

The name Baildon derives from the Old English bēgeldūn meaning 'bend hill' or 'circle hill'.

Baildon is recorded as Beldone and Beldune in the Domesday Book. In 1066 it belonged to a Gospatric, son of Arnketil, and had passed to Erneis of Buron by 1086.

Baildon had two manor houses: one on Hall Cliffe, the other in lower Baildon.

During the Industrial Revolution, Baildon developed a woollen industry; Westgate House was built in 1814 by the Ambler family who were prominent in the wool trade and the warehouse part of the building was Feathers Bakery now Nine Café adjacent to the mill which is now the Westgate Bar.

During the 19th and early 20th centuries, conditions in Bradford deteriorated and poverty and ill health became widespread; Baildon began developing as a commuter town along with neighbouring Shipley. In the 1960s, the Hall Cliffe manor house was demolished and replaced with the Ian Clough Hall, named after a local mountaineer. In the latter years of the 20th century, the West Riding suffered from economic decline through the gradual closure of its textile and engineering industries. Bradford was particularly affected by this; however, Leeds grew as a major administrative and financial centre and Baildon with its railway links to Leeds has become a strategic commuter town.

=== Gypsy parties ===
Baildon was an important location for the British Gypsy community. A report of 1929 stated that annual Gypsy Parties had started two to three hundred years before – records were said to go back to 1770 when it was reported to be an ancient custom. In 1881, up to 5,000 people are said to have paid for admission. Gradually the event was taken over by local residents, who dressed up as Gypsies and formed 'tribes'. Proceeds went to the local horticultural society. After 1897 the tradition died out, apparently because the 'real Gypsies' had disappeared. However, in 1929 it was revived to raise funds for Baildon Hospital. A local resident, John Keen, then contacted the so-called King of the Gypsies, Xavier Petulengro, and they re-established large Gypsy gatherings at Baildon, recorded on Pathe News films and shown nationally in cinemas.

The Gypsy Parties ended with the start of the Second World War, and were never revived.

=== Pleasure Grounds ===
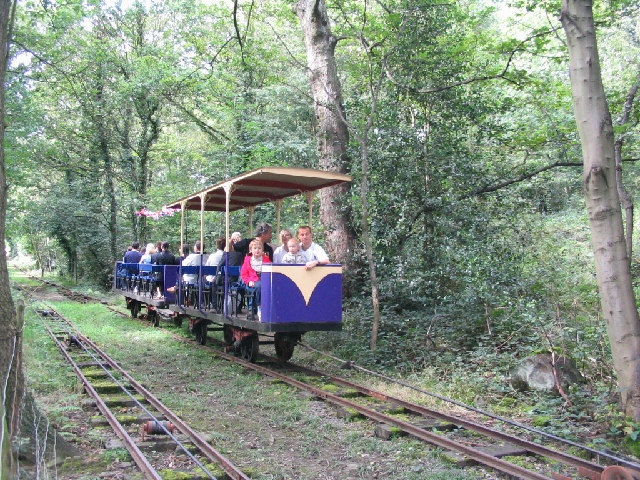
Shipley Glen Tramway

In northern Shipley off Prod Lane there was a small fairground with dodgem cars, booths and a historic "Aerial Glide" suspended roller coaster that for a short period had listed building status. In earlier years the fairground attractions at Shipley Glen were much more extensive. The fairground closed and is now dismantled and newly built (2015/6) private housing now covers the site. The only working remnant of the Pleasure Grounds is the Shipley Glen Cable Tramway, a funicular railway carrying passengers from just north of Roberts Park, Saltaire up the hill side through Walker Wood to the location of the Pleasure Grounds at the top of Prod Lane.

== Geography ==
Baildon lies to the north east of Bradford, and is linked to Bradford and Shipley by the B6151. To the north of Baildon lies Baildon Moor, a part of Rombalds Moor, with several quarries and underlying strata of coal. There are the remains of old bell pits for mining the coal.

Across Baildon Moor is the village of Menston, the town of Ilkley and Ilkley Moor. Baildon is situated on a hill to the north of the River Aire and the Leeds and Liverpool Canal.

Baildon is 9 miles (14 km) from Leeds city centre and 3 miles (5 km) from Bradford city centre.

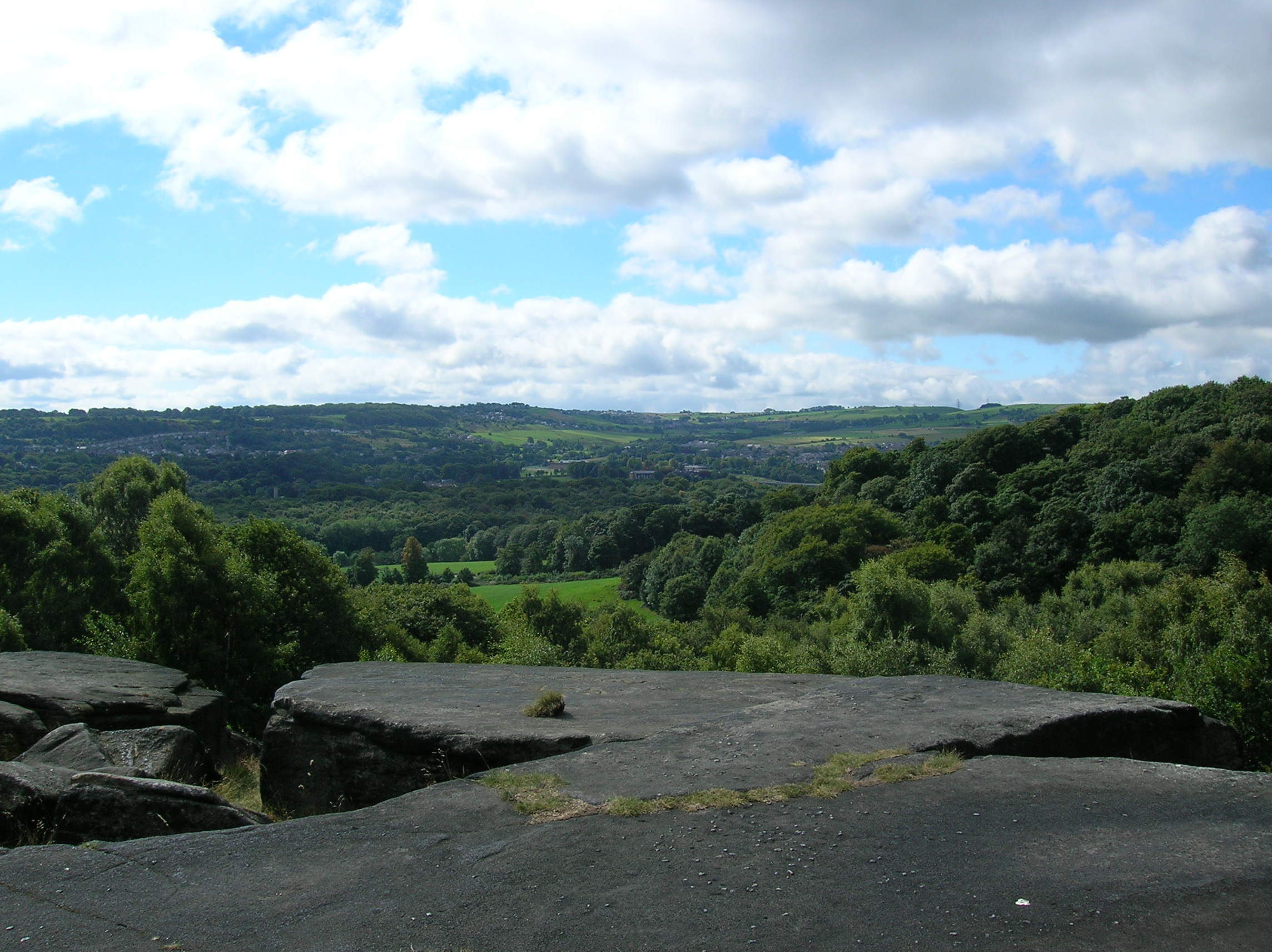
Catten Stones above Shipley Glen

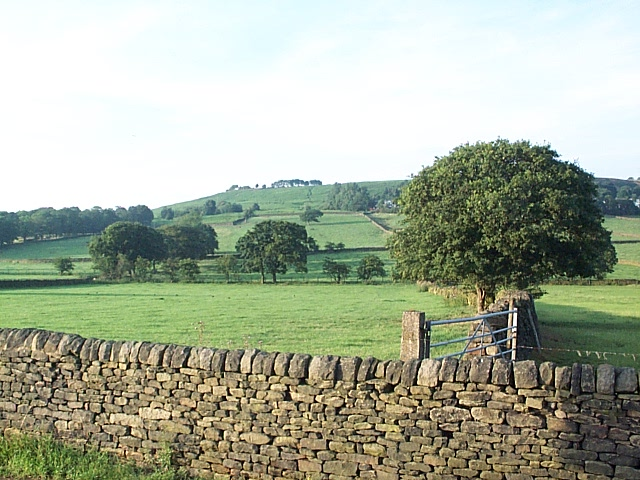
Baildon Moor

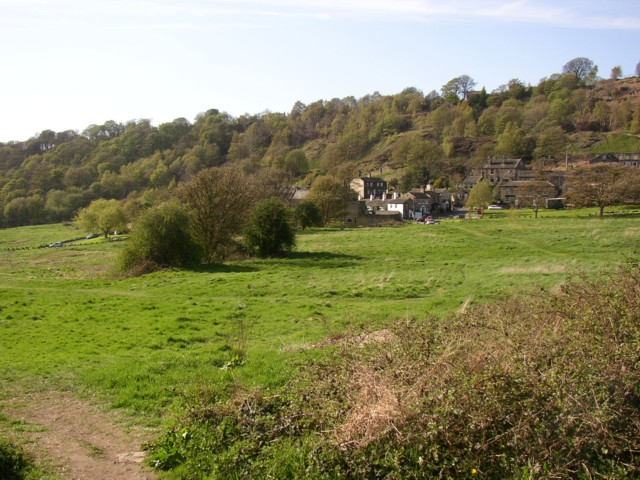
Baildon Green

== Governance ==
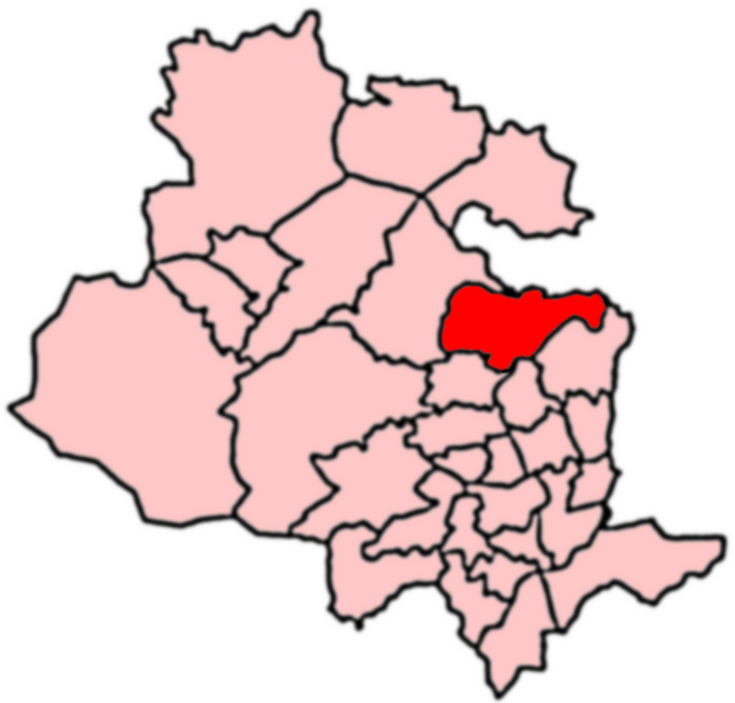
2004 Boundaries of Baildon Ward

History

Baildon was made a local board district in 1852. Elections were held on 16 September 1852, and the first quorate meeting of the local board was held on 9 October 1852. Such districts were reconstituted as urban districts with effect from 31 December 1894 under the Local Government Act 1894. It was then administered by Baildon Urban District Council until it was disbanded when Bradford Metropolitan District Council was established in 1974.

Present day

A group of local residents held an open meeting on 7 May 1997 and as a result the Baildon Community Council came into being on 26 June 1997 as a means of communicating local interest to appropriate authorities. Residents of Baildon went through the appropriate legal process and as a result Baildon Parish Council was formed which held its first full meeting 14 May 2007. The civil parish does not cover nearby Esholt, part of the Baildon Ward at District level, but includes the area North of the River Aire along Coach Road and Higher Coach Road (Baildon South West) which is within the Shipley Ward at District level.

On Monday 10 June 2013 Baildon officially became a town when Baildon Parish Council resolved that, in accordance with the Local Government Act 1972 s245, the Parish of Baildon shall have the status of a town. Consequently, the Parish Council was renamed Baildon Town Council.

Councillors

Baildon ward is represented on Bradford Council by three Conservative councillors, Valerie Townend, Mike Pollard and Debbie Davies.

Election	Councillor	Councillor	Councillor
2004	Valerie Townend (Con)	John Briggs (Lib Dem)	John Cole (Lib Dem)
2006	Valerie Townend (Con)	John Briggs (Lib Dem)	John Cole (Lib Dem)
2007	Valerie Townend (Con)	Roger L'Amie (Con)	John Cole (Lib Dem)
2008	Valerie Townend (Con	Roger L'Amie (Con)	John Cole (Lib Dem)
2010	Valerie Townend (Con)	Roger L'Amie (Con)	John Cole (Lib Dem)
2011	Valerie Townend (Con)	Roger L'Amie (Con)	John Cole (Lib Dem)
2012	Valerie Townend (Con)	Roger L'Amie (Con)	Debbie Davies (Con)
2014	Valerie Townend (Con)	Roger L'Amie (Con)	Debbie Davies (Con)
2015	Valerie Townend (Con)	Mike Pollard (Con)	Debbie Davies (Con)
2016	Valerie Townend (Con)	Mike Pollard (Con)	Debbie Davies (Con)
2018	Valerie Townend (Con)	Mike Pollard (Con)	Debbie Davies (Con)

indicates seat up for re-election.

== Economy ==
Baildon has a modest town centre with most everyday amenities including independent traders, estate agents and family law solicitors.

There is a Co-op supermarket and a small Tesco on the outskirts. The centre is home to many independent shops including Westgate General Stores, Seasons Home, Finesse Gifts and Baildon Interiors. There are also several independently owned hair dressers and beauty salons and a variety of restaurants and take-aways. There are some eight public houses and bars in Baildon.

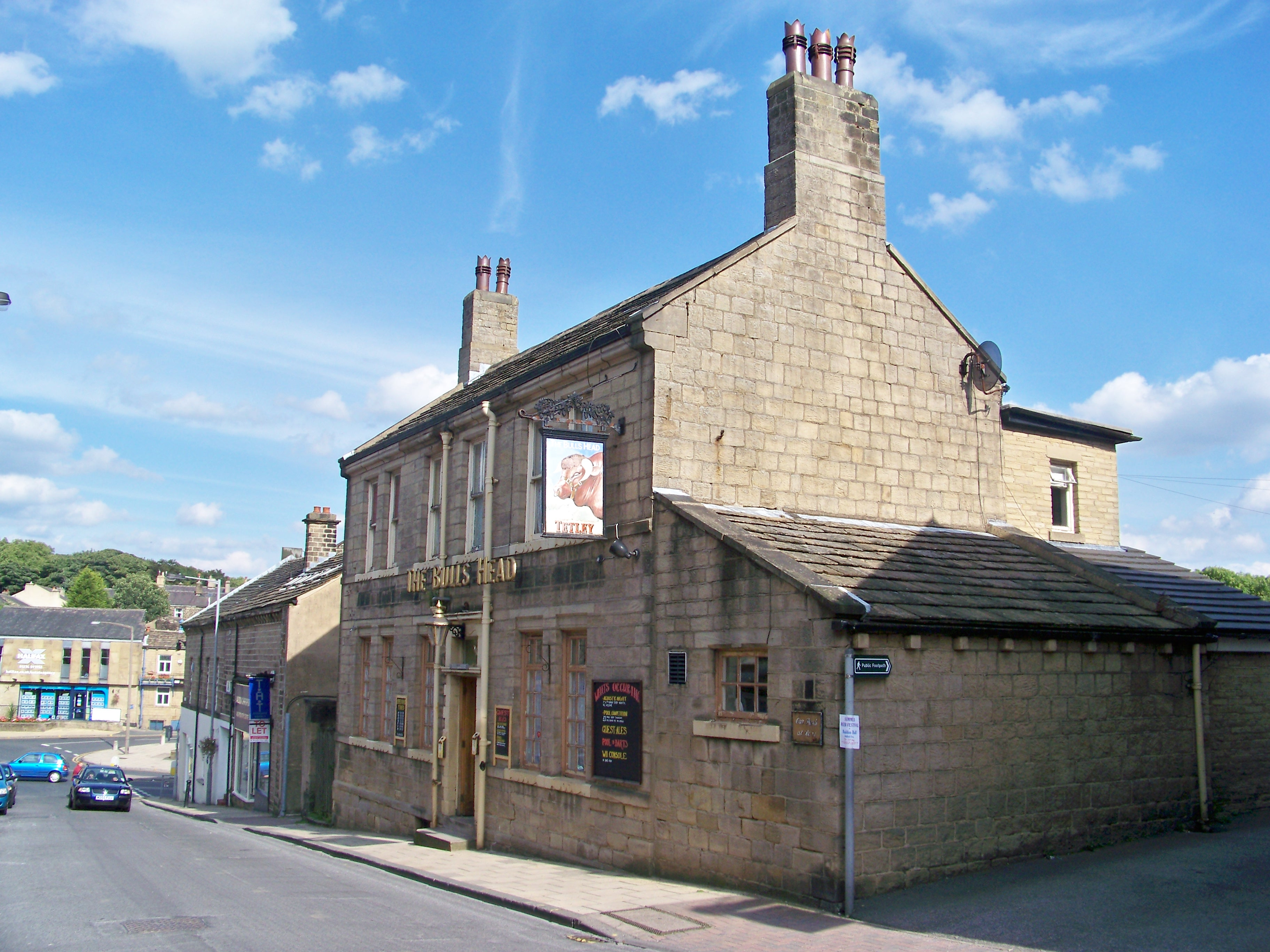
The Bulls Head public house, Westgate

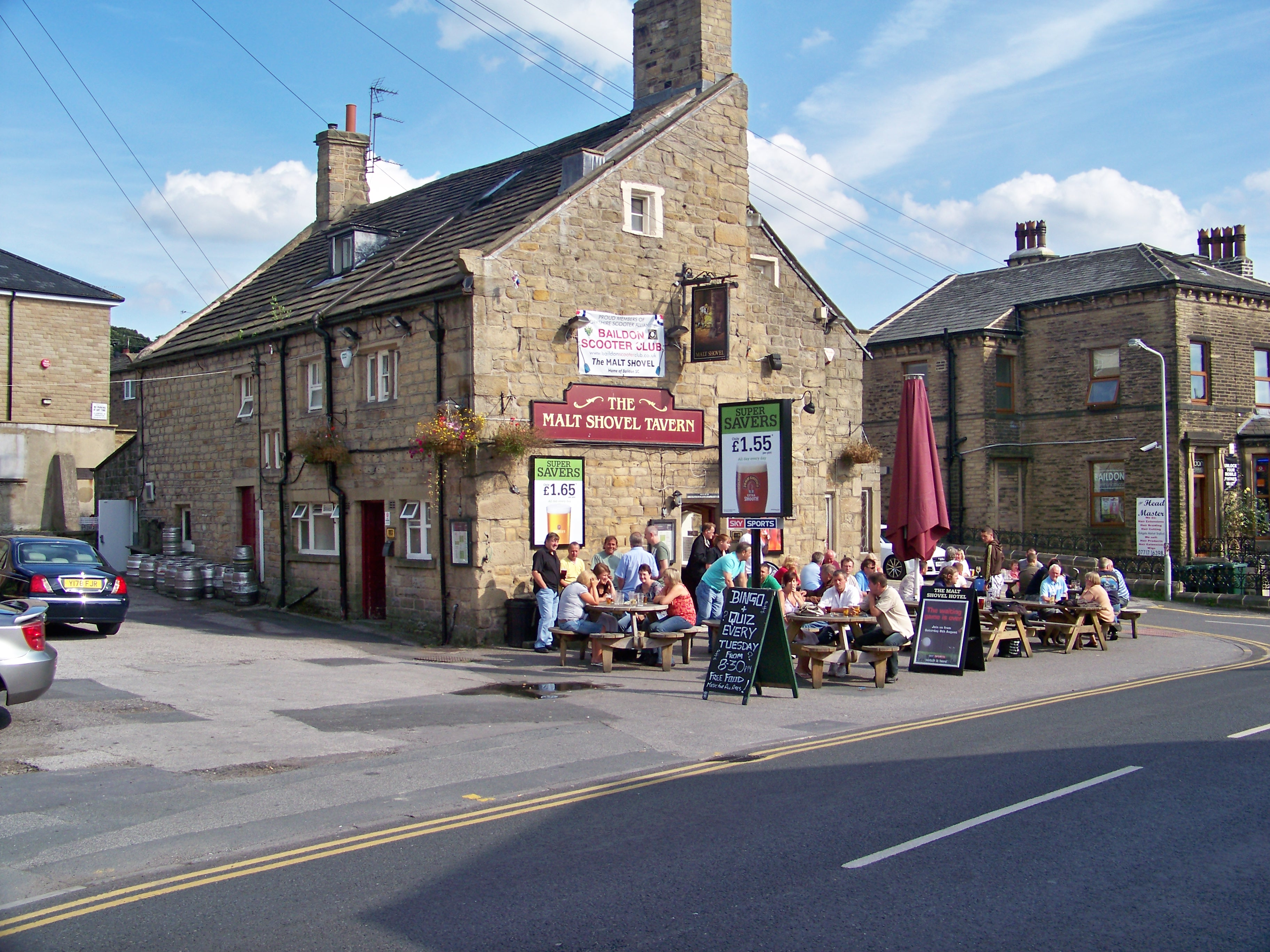
The Malt Shovel Tavern,^{*} Northgate
^{*} listed buildings

=== Charlestown ===
Charlestown in south east Baildon is the area of Baildon with the highest concentration of industry. The area is in the valley bottom between Otley Road and the River Aire, and includes the Acorn Park Industrial Estate and the Butterfield Industrial Estate. Notable companies established in Charlestown include Manor Coating Systems and Denso Marston Radiators.

Further north east in Charlestown there are plans for a 'Baildon Business Park' and hotel on a green field site near Buck Lane, at a cost of £25 million but there is opposition to the move. Another industrial area is the Tong Park Industrial Estate off Otley Road in eastern Baildon.

== Landmarks ==
One of the main monuments in Baildon is the Frances Ferrand memorial fountain, known locally as the 'potted meat stick'. This was built by Baron Amphlett of Somerset as a memorial to his mother-in-law, Frances Ferrand. It still stands today to the eastern side of Browgate. In 1925 the monument was put at threat when plans were produced to replace in with a bus terminus. In the 1960s the monument was removed and dismantled; however, in 1986 the Mechanics Institute raised funds to take it out of storage and restore it. To the north of Towngate roundabout in front of Glendale House is a concrete paved open area created in the 1960s containing what remains of the stocks and a sandstone pillar thought to be the remains of a mediaeval cross, both Grade II listed. On Glen Road on the edge of Baildon Moor, close to Shipley Glen, is Bracken Hall Countryside Centre and Museum, a free-to-visit children's museum, natural history education centre and nature centre.

Baildon's war memorials are situated on Browgate and in Tong Park.

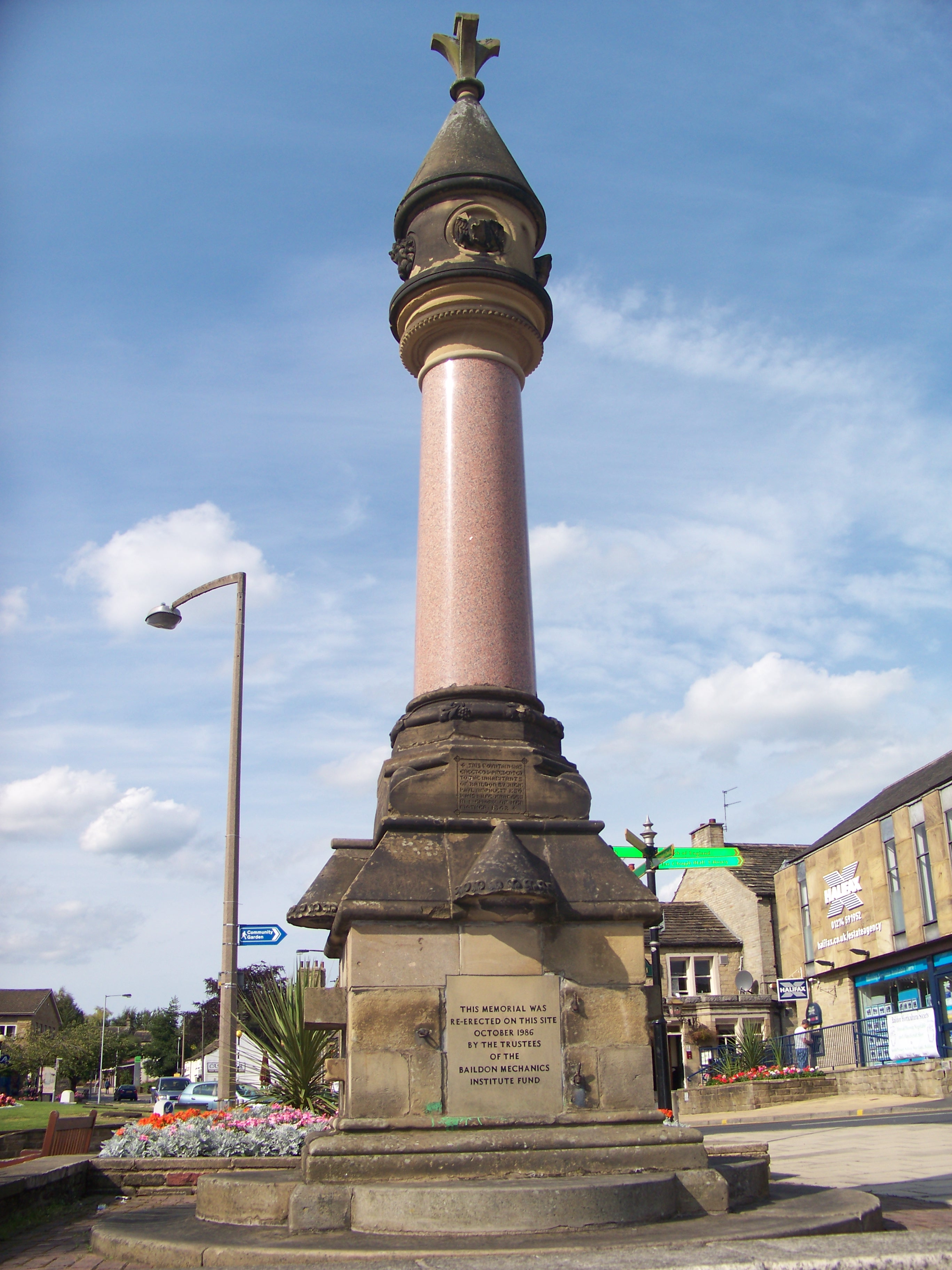
Frances Ferrand memorial fountain

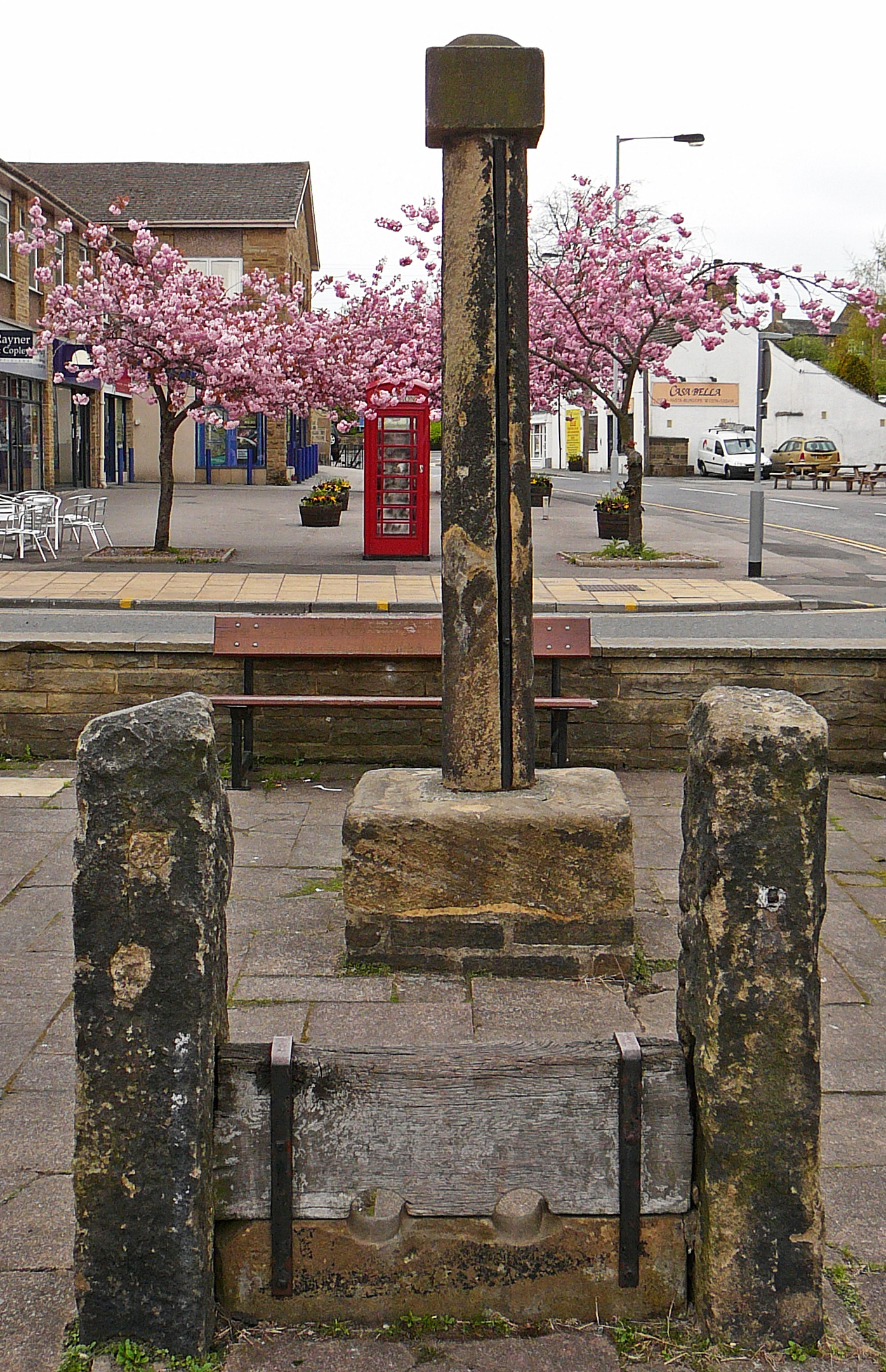
Stocks and sandstone pillar

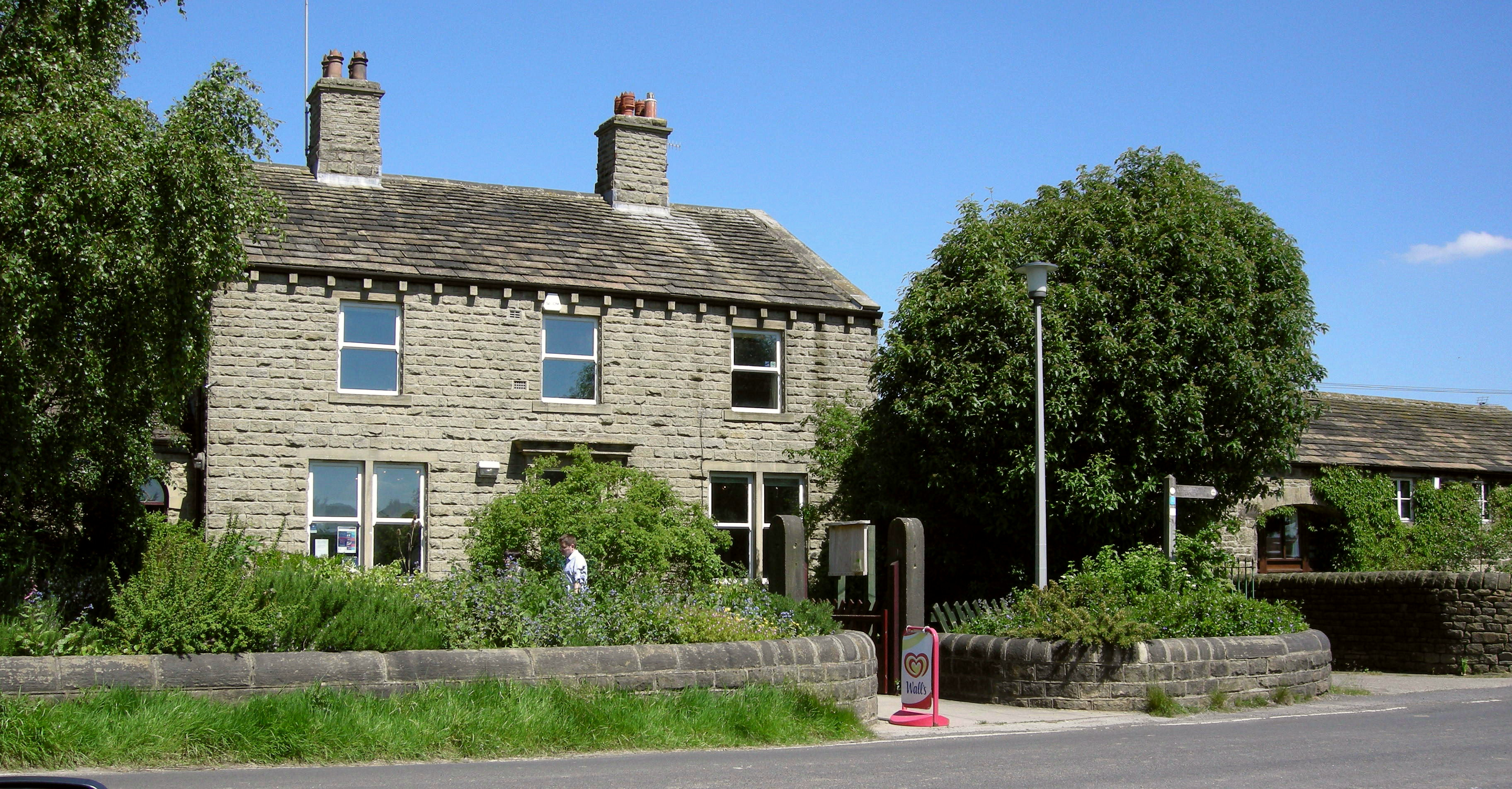
Bracken Hall Countryside Centre

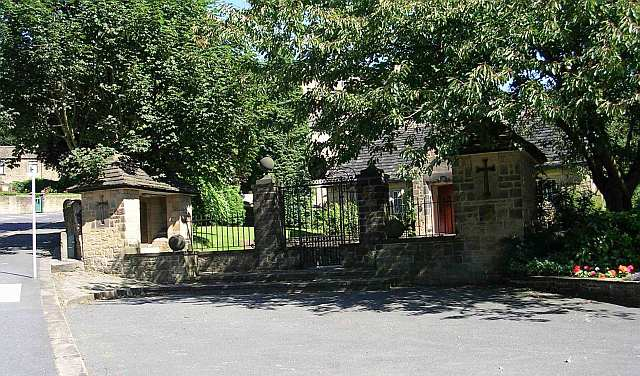
Baildon War Memorial, Browgate

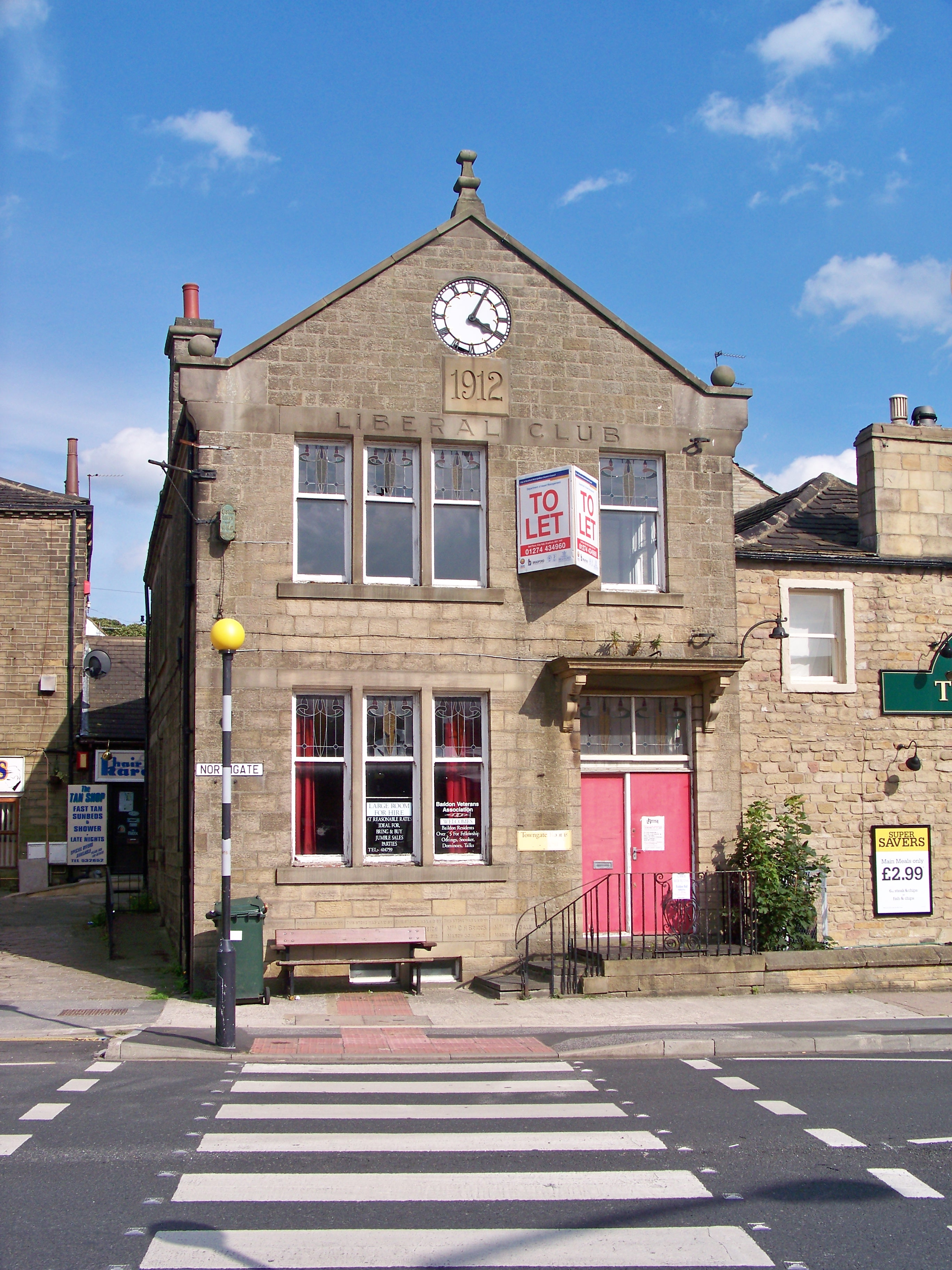
The Liberal Club, Northgate

North of Upper Coach Road in Shipley is Shipley Glen Tramway, a narrow-gauge funicular railway. The railway takes passengers between the valley floor near Titus Salt School to the bottom of Prod Lane, a short walking distance from Shipley Glen.

=== Churches ===
The Church of St. James in Charlestown is a painted tongue and groove timber building, now a grade II listed building. It was moved to Baildon from Great Warley, Essex in 1905. The Reverend N. R. Bailey, rector of Great Warley, had property in Baildon and hoped to retire there. However his obituary was published in November 1900 before he retired. In 2007/2008 the church was moved again, but only by a few yards. This allowed the surrounding land to be sold by the Diocese for development. Rotten timbers were replaced and underground heat pump system installed to make the building more eco-friendly.

The Church of St. John the Evangelist designed by Mallinson & Healey, was built in 1848 though the south tower was not added until 1928. The east window designed by Powell & Sons was added in 1870.

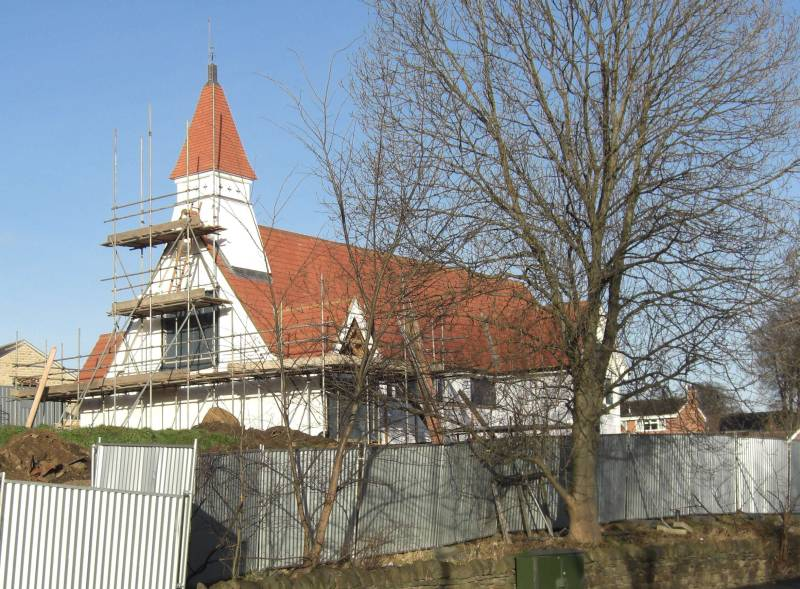
Church of St. James^{*} during the move and refit in 2007

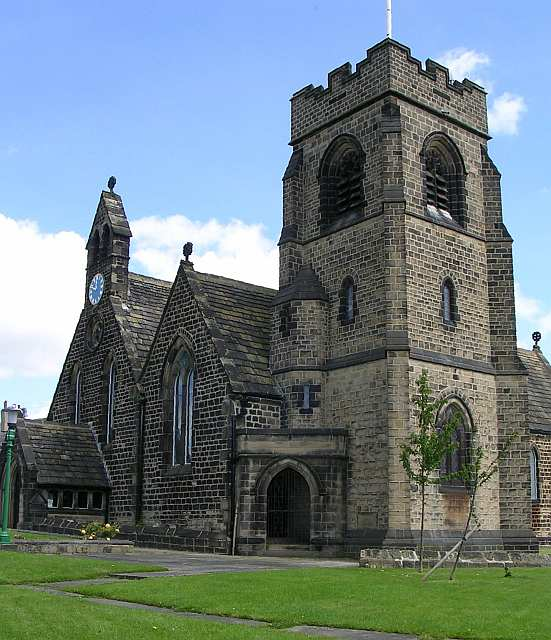
Church of St. John the Evangelist,^{*} Hall Cliffe

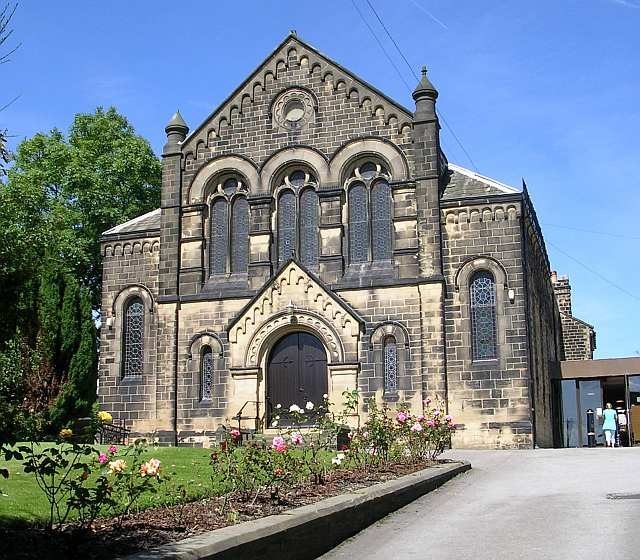
Baildon Methodist Church, Binswell Fold

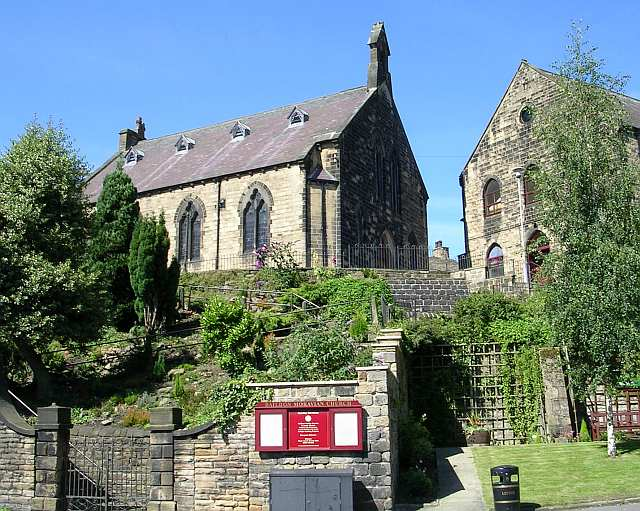
Baildon Moravian Church.^{*}
^{*} listed buildings

== Transport ==
The village is served by Baildon railway station on the electrified Wharfedale Line with connections to Bradford Forster Square and Ilkley. There is however, no service to Leeds owing to its position on the curve between the two lines. Passengers must instead change at Shipley or the nearby Guiseley (Shipley having more services). Baildon is served by the West Yorkshire Metro 626, 649, and 656–659 First and Yorkshire Tiger bus services. The main road through Baildon is the A6038 Otley Road while the B6151 Baildon Road / Brow Gate goes the short distance from Otley Road up to Browgate roundabout.

== Education ==
There were a large number of First and Middle schools in the area, including Ferniehurst First School, Tong Park First School, Belmont Middle School and Ladderbanks Middle School, before the 1998 Bradford Education reform which returned the area to a two-tier school system. Currently, there are four local primary schools: Sandal Primary School to the North on West Lane, Baildon Church of England School to the east off Langley Lane, Hoyle Court Primary school in Charlestown and Baildon Glen Primary School to the south on Thompson Lane.

The nearest secondary school for the area is Titus Salt School on Higher Coach Road, overlooking Roberts Park, Saltaire. There is dispute as to which town the school actually is in, some classing it as Baildon and some as Saltaire.

== Sport and leisure ==
Within Baildon there are sports clubs for cricket, football, golf, rugby and running.

Sconce camp site, near to Baildon, is operated by Aire Valley scout district.

== Media ==
Local news and television programmes are provided by BBC Yorkshire and ITV Yorkshire. Television signals are received from the Emley Moor TV transmitter and the Idle relay transmitter. Local radio stations are BBC Radio Leeds, Heart Yorkshire, Capital Yorkshire, Hits Radio West Yorkshire, and Greatest Hits Radio West Yorkshire. The town is served by the local newspaper, Telegraph & Argus.

== Culture and events ==
For nearly a quarter of a century the August bank holiday weekend saw over 500 Harley-Davidson riders arrive in Baildon as part of the annual UK rally of the Harley-Davidson Riders Club of Great Britain fundraising rally. The HDRCGB ran the rally up to 2001 when it moved to Berkshire. In 2003, Harley-Davidson's Centenary Year, the HDRCGB hosted the event for the last time in Baildon. The rally is now organised by the Shipley Harley-Davidson Club. In 2008 430 riders were given a police escort down Browgate towards Hollins Hill, from where most riders travelled to Harewood House.

=== Cultural references ===
==== Film and television ====
- Billy Liar (1963) – Locations: Midland Road; Hinchliffe Avenue (Number 37 is the Fisher household)
- Monty Python's The Meaning of Life (1983) – Locations: Baildon Moor
- Damon & Debbie (1987) – Locations: St Anne's Terrace; Threshfield
- Rita, Sue & Bob Too (1987) – Locations: Bramham Drive (Number 5 is Bob's House); Baildon Moor; Baildon Village.
- Where The Heart Is (1997) – Locations: Ferniehurst First School, Cliffe Lane West & Baildon Green

==== Music ====
- Baildon Moor is mentioned in the song LS43 by New Model Army

Baildon Orchestra is an amateur orchestra which was formed in the mid-1940s and still meets on a weekly basis throughout the year. website baildonorchestra.weebly.com

== Notable people ==
The late journalist and Countdown TV game show presenter Richard Whiteley was a native of Baildon, and Austin Mitchell, Labour Member of Parliament (MP) for Great Grimsby from 1977 until 2015, was born in Baildon. The former wool merchant and RAF Officer Geoffrey Ambler was born in Baildon in 1904.

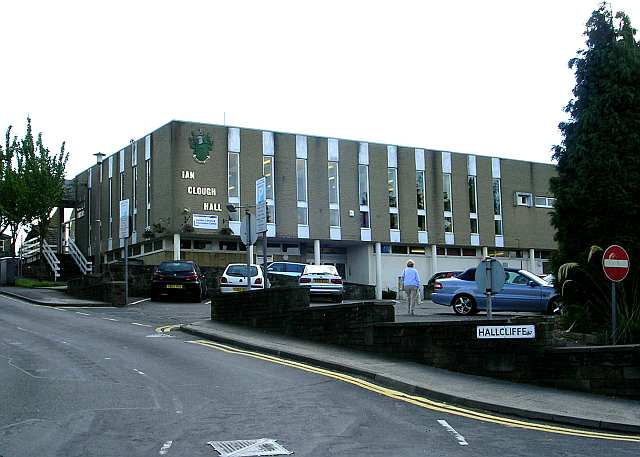
The former Ian Clough Hall, Hallcliffe

Mountaineer Ian Clough was born in Baildon. After he was killed on an expedition to the Himalayan mountain Annapurna in 1970, Ian Clough Hall, a meeting-place and arts venue, was established in Baildon in his memory. The hall was demolished in late 2023; the site was destined to become a complex of private retirement flats but the proposed developer pulled out of the purchase of the land. The site is currently not in use and is off limits to the public. In the 1960s, Clough and close friend Chris Bonington were known to have practised their climbing techniques on Baildon Bank – a 1,000-foot-long (300 m), 50-foot-high (15 m), ex-quarry rock-face that looks out towards Bradford. In 1962, Clough and Bonington were the first Britons to successfully scale the treacherous north face of the Eiger in the Swiss Alps. Ex-Yorkshire & England cricket captain Brian Close, born in nearby Rawdon, settled in the village, and died there in 2015 after a long battle with cancer. Ex-Yorkshire and England cricket fast bowler Matthew Hoggard, though originally from Pudsey, lived in Baildon for some years and was a member of Baildon Cricket Club. The explorer James Theodore Bent (1852–1897) spent his boyhood at Baildon House on Station Road. Family memorials are to be found in St John's church. Geoffrey Brindley, known locally as the Jesus Man of Bradford lived in Baildon until his death in 2015, and there were plans to erect a statue of him in the town.

== See also ==
- Listed buildings in Baildon
