= Listed buildings in Baildon =

Baildon is the name of a civil parish, and also of a ward of the City of Bradford, West Yorkshire, England. The parish and the ward together contain 91 listed buildings that are recorded in the National Heritage List for England. Of these, three are listed at Grade II*, the middle of the three grades, and the others are at Grade II, the lowest grade.

In the parish are the town of Baildon and the surrounding area. Most of the listed buildings in the town are houses, cottages and shops, and the other listed buildings include churches and associated structures, a set of stocks, a cross and cross base, a model farm, a school, milestones, and buildings formerly involved in the textile industry. To the west of the town is Roberts Park, part of the model village of Saltaire, which contains a number of listed buildings.

The ward is to the east of the parish, and its main settlement is the village of Esholt. The listed buildings in and around the village include cottages and houses, farmhouses and farm buildings, a church, a public house, a bridge, a memorial hall, and a telephone kiosk. To the southeast is Esholt Hall, a large house, which is listed together with associated structures, and to the south is the listed Field Lock, a three-rise lock on the Leeds and Liverpool Canal.

== Key ==
Grade	Criteria
II*	Particularly important buildings of more than special interest
II	Buildings of national importance and special interest

== Buildings ==
Name and location	Photograph	Date	Notes	Grade
Baildon Hall; 53.85021°N 1.76548°W	—	14th century	The timber framed part of the manor house was encased in stone in the 16th and 17th centuries, and there have been later extensions. It has a stone slate roof, two storeys, cellars and attics, and a double depth plan. The west front has a hall range that has three gables with moulded coping, and parapets, and a projecting wing to the right. It contains a mullioned and transomed hall window, cross windows in the gables, and mullioned and sash windows elsewhere. The doorway has a moulded surround, composite jambs, and a shallow-arched lintel with spandrels. At the rear is a gabled stair tower.	II*
Bank Walk House; 53.85208°N 1.76837°W	—	c. 1500	The house has a timber framed core, and was encased in stone in the 17th century. It has a plinth, a stone slate roof, two storeys at the front and an aisle at the rear with one storey. There are four bays, and an outshut to the right with a cellar. The doorway on the front has tie-stone jambs and a large chamfered lintel, and at the rear is a two-storey porch with a moulded band. The windows are mullioned.	II
Esholt Old Hall and barn 53.85741°N 1.72475°W		Late 16th century	The hall was extended to the right in the mid-17th century, and the barn was added further to the right in the late 18th or early 19th century. The building is in gritstone with stone slate roofs. The original part has two storeys, and contains two doorways and mullioned windows, the window on the left in the ground floor with round-arched lights and a hood mould. The later section has two storeys and an attic under a gable. There are two bays, and it contains a doorway with a hood mould, and windows, some mullioned and some with single lights. At the rear are two gables and mullioned and transomed windows. The barn has a full-height segmental-arched entrance.	II*
Barn at the rear of the Angel Public House; 53.85360°N 1.76543°W	—	Early to mid 17th century	A stone barn with quoins, a stone slate roof, and four bays. It contains a central cart entry with composite jambs and a raised lintel, and to the right is a doorway with composite jambs and a quoined lintel.	II
Butler Cottage and Farmhouse; 53.85237°N 1.76416°W	—	Mid 17th century	A house, later divided, it is in stone with quoins, and a stone slate roof with a coped gable and kneelers to the right. There are two storeys, three bays, and a rear outshut. The house contains inserted doorways, and the windows are mullioned, with some mullions removed. In the right return is a taking-in door converted into a window.	II
Cross-base and shaft 53.85369°N 1.76627°W	—	Mid 17th century (probable)	The cross base and shaft were restored in the 20th century. They are in stone, and consist of a square base on a plinth, with a circular shaft in the centre surmounted by a block of stone with a modern domed top.	II
Old Hall, Baildon; 53.85238°N 1.76765°W	—	Mid 17th century	The house was later altered, and the cross-wing was replaced in 1908. The house is in stone with a stone slate roof, two storeys, a front with three gables, and a projecting right wing. All the windows are double-chamfered and mullioned. On the front is an inserted doorway with an architrave, a dated and initialled keystone and an entablature. In the cross-wing is a re-used sundial. At the rear is a doorway with a chamfered and moulded surround, composite jambs, a deep dated and initialled lintel, and a hood mould.	II
Trench Farmhouse; 53.84341°N 1.79979°W	—	Mid 17th century	A stone farmhouse on a plinth, with rusticated quoins, a band, and a stone slate roof with coped gables, kneelers, and sculpted finials. There are two storeys, and a double-depth L-shaped plan, with a symmetrical front of five bays, and a rear gabled wing and outshut. The central doorway has pilasters with moulded capitals, and an arched lintel with a raised keystone and daisies in the spandrels. Above it is an oval datestone and a circular window. In the outer bays are cross windows with mullions, and at the rear is a mullioned and transomed window.	II
Barn north of Trench Farmhouse; 53.84365°N 1.79983°W	—	Mid to late 17th century (probable)	A stone barn with quoins and a stone slate roof. There are two ranges, forming an L-shaped plan. In the junction is a cart entry with a porch and a monolithic lintel. To the right is an arched doorway with a chamfered surround and composite jambs, and a doorway with monolithic jambs, a chamfered lintel, and a weathered inscription. The other openings are windows and arched vents.	II
Garden Cottage, Esholt Hall; 53.85388°N 1.71205°W	—	Late 17th century	The cottage, which was later extended, is in gritstone, with quoins and a stone slate roof, hipped at the west end. There is a gabled porch, and the windows are mullioned with two or four lights.	II
Midgley Farmhouse and Farm Cottages; 53.84315°N 1.78323°W	—	Late 17th century	A house and two cottages in one range, they are in stone with a stone slate roof. There are two storeys and an outshut behind the house. The house has a porch and a doorway with a chamfered surround, one cottage has a doorway with tie-stone jambs, and the other has monolithic jambs. Most of the windows are mullioned, and there is a blocked taking-in door.	II
Bracken Hall Farmhouse and barn 53.84740°N 1.80148°W	—	Late 17th to early 18th century	The house has retained portions of earlier timber framing, and the barn dates from the 18th century. The buildings are in stone with a stone slate roof. The house has two storeys and two bays. The doorway has monolithic jambs, a semicircular-arched lintel with sunken spandrels, impost blocks, and a keystone. The windows were mullioned, and the mullions have been removed. The barn is at right angles, it has an aisle, a tall cart entry with a monolithic lintel, and double tie-stone jambs.	II
Malt Shovel Public House; 53.85410°N 1.76580°W		Late 17th or early 18th century	The public house is in stone with quoins, and a stone slate roof with coped gables and kneelers. The doorway has a Tudor arch and sunken spandrels and an oval window above, and most of the windows are mullioned.	II
St Leonard's Farmhouse; 53.85889°N 1.72529°W	—	Late 17th or early 18th century	The farmhouse, which was extended in about 1800, is in gritstone, rendered on the front, and has a stone slate roof, carried over an outshut at the rear. The doorway has a plain surround, on the front are two-light square mullioned windows, and the mullions have been removed from windows elsewhere.	II
Esholt Hall, terrace and conservatory 53.85290°N 1.71482°W	—	1706–10	A large house in gritstone on a plinth, with chamfered rusticated quoins, a moulded band, a modillion eaves cornice and blocking course, and a hipped slate roof. There are two storeys and a square plan, with fronts of seven bays, and an inner courtyard. The middle three bays of the south front project under a modillion pediment. In the centre is a doorway with an architrave and a segmental pediment on consoles, and the windows are sashes in architraves. On the west front is a 19th-century arched porch. The house is built on a terrace, and to the north is a 19th-century conservatory.	II*
Riverside Mill; 53.85193°N 1.71493°W	—	c. 1706–10	A garden feature built on the site of an ancient mill, it is in gritstone with rusticated quoins, and a roof of flat stone slabs. It consists of a single-storey building against the river bank, with an L-shaped plan, plus a wing with two low arches. The main range has three bays, and a central doorway with a rusticated surround and a lintel with a triple keystone. In the outer bays are large circular openings with four keystones.	II
Gate piers, Esholt Hall; 53.85378°N 1.71446°W	—	c. 1707	The gate piers at the north entrance to the garden are in stone. They are panelled and have corniced capping and ball finials.	II
Three piers, Esholt Hall; 53.85255°N 1.71341°W	—	c. 1707	The piers are set on a terrace in front of the hall. They are re-set gate piers in stone, they are panelled, and have corniced caps with carved floral garlands on the sides.	II
27 and 27A Station Road, Baildon; 53.84958°N 1.76144°W	—	1715	A stone house with quoins, and a stone slate roof with coped gables and kneelers. There are two storeys, five bays, a single-storey kitchen wing at the rear, and a 20th-century extension on the front. In the ground floor is a segmental archway on the left, a blocked doorway with composite jambs and an initialled and dated lintel, an inserted doorway with a porch, and sash windows. In the upper floor and at the rear the windows are mullioned.	II
Baildon House; 53.85018°N 1.75975°W	—	1715	A cottage and a house dated 1724 to the right, they are in stone with stone slate roofs. The cottage has two storeys, a coped gable with kneelers and a weathervane to the left, a doorway with tie-stone jambs, a datestone, and mullioned windows. The house has two storeys and an attic, quoins, a moulded eaves cornice, coped gables, and four bays. In the outer bays are canted bay windows, the other windows are mullioned, and there is a datestone in a decorative plaque. The left return contains a porch with cast iron columns and a doorway with monolithic jambs and a lintel. At the rear is an arched stair window with imposts and a keystone.	II
29 Station Road, Baildon; 53.84967°N 1.76100°W	—	1719	A house, at one time a shop, it is in stone, and has a stone slate roof with coped gables and kneelers. There are two storeys, a symmetrical front of three bays, and a rear outshut. The doorway has monolithic jambs, and a lintel with a false keystone. Above it is a date plaque, and an oval window with a raised surround and a keystone, and in the outer bays are mullioned windows with some mullions removed. At the rear are inserted shop windows.	II
Bridge, Esholt Estate; 53.85214°N 1.71471°W	—	Early 18th century (probable)	The bridge carries the drive to Esholt Hall over a stream It is in gritstone, and consists of a single semicircular arch. The bridge has voussoirs and a keystone, and the walls are coped and slightly swept to the abutments.	II
Laundry, Esholt Hall; 53.85309°N 1.71459°W	—	Early 18th century	The building is in gritstone, with chamfered quoins, a sill band, corbelled eaves, and a hipped slate roof. There are two storeys and a rectangular plan, and the windows have raised flat surrounds. Built into the main wall is an embattled 16th-century tombstone.	II
Stocks; 53.85367°N 1.76627°W		Early 18th century (probable)	The stocks, which have been moved from their original site, consist of two tall rectangular stone piers with grooves on their inner sides for rails.	II
Coach House Range, Esholt Hall; 53.85335°N 1.71523°W	—	c. 1727–30	The former coach house, which has been converted for residential use, is in sandstone with hipped stone slate roofs. There are two storeys, a symmetrical front, and a single-story extension to the south. In the centre is a full-height pedimented archway with an impost, string course, and an archivolt arch. Flanking the archway are segmental-arched coach doorways. The other doorways have fanlights, and there are blind oculi panels between the upper floor windows.	II
1 and 2 Ghyllbeck Farm; 53.85378°N 1.73859°W	—	Early to mid 18th century	A house, later divided, it is in stone with quoins, and a stone slate roof with coped gables and kneelers. There are two storeys, a symmetrical front of three bays, and a rear wing. The central doorway has monolithic jambs and a lintel with a moulded surround, and above it is a circular window with a raised surround. The windows are mullioned with two lights.	II
Gill Beck Bridge; 53.85383°N 1.73781°W	—	Early to mid 18th century (probable)	The bridge carries Esholt Lane over Gill Beck. It is in stone, and consists of a single segmental arch, and it is hump-backed. The voussoirs are recessed, and the parapets have coping that rises to form an arch in the style of a Tudor arch.	II
Lambspring Farmhouse and barn 53.86024°N 1.73806°W	—	Early to mid 18th century	The farmhouse and integral barn are in gritstone with quoins, a stone slate roof and two storeys. The house has three bays, a central doorway with squared jambs, and the windows are mullioned with three lights. The barn contains a recessed quoined portal with a timber lintel and side doors.	II
Outbuilding, Esholt Hall; 53.85362°N 1.71494°W	—	Mid 18th century	The outbuilding is in sandstone, it has a stone slate roof with gables and a finial, and two storeys. In the upper storey are four circular windows with keystones and round-headed vents. In the ground floor is a central segmental-arched entrance with voussoirs, and four doorways with squared jambs. The gable ends contain round-headed windows with imposts and keystones.	II
9, 11 and 13 Browgate, Baildon; 53.85273°N 1.76633°W		1755	A row of three buildings, No. 13 dating from the early 19th century. They are in stone with stone slate roofs and two storeys, forming a U-shaped plan, with No. 11 recessed. No. 9, on the right, originated as a Methodist meeting room. It has quoins, a modern shop front in the ground floor, a tall semicircular-arched window with voussoirs above, and a coped gable with kneelers. To the left is a projecting gabled outshut. No. 11 has three bays, a doorway with monolithic jambs, a window in the middle bay, to the right is a segmental-arched dated doorway with voussoirs, and in the upper floor are sash windows. No. 13 has two bays, a doorway in the right bay with tie-stone jambs, a shop window to the left, and sash windows in the upper floor.	II
Crowtrees; 53.84981°N 1.76159°W	—	Mid to late 18th century	A stone house with quoins and a stone slate roof. There are two storeys and four bays. On the ground floor are a doorway with tie-stone jambs and a lean-to porch, a doorway with tie-stone jambs converted into a window, and an inserted doorway with monolithic jambs. The windows are mullioned.	II
22, 24 and 26 Brook Hill, Baildon; 53.84962°N 1.76024°W	—	Mid to late 18th century	A row of four stone cottages with a stone slate roof. There are two storeys and four bays. In each bay is a doorway with monolithic jambs and mullioned windows, with three lights in the ground floor and four in the upper floor. No. 26 has an inserted bow window, and at the rear most of the windows have been altered.	II
Barn, St Leonard's Farm; 53.85891°N 1.72558°W	—	Mid to late 18th century (probable)	The barn is in sandstone grit, and has a stone slate roof. There is an external stone staircase to the loft.	II
Field Three-Rise Lock; 53.85392°N 1.72805°W		1774–77	The three locks are numbers 16, 17 and 18 on the Leeds and Liverpool Canal. They consist of three adjoining wide chambers in stone with coping, and steps at the sides. The lock gates are in wood, there is a wooden footbridge over the tail of each lock, and there is an overflow weir on the side opposite to the towpath.	II
16 Low Fold, Baildon; 53.85491°N 1.76758°W		Late 18th century	A pair of back-to-back houses, they are in stone with quoins, and a stone slate roof with coped gables and kneelers. There are two storeys and an attic, and a symmetrical front of three bays. The central doorway has tie-stone jambs, and in the outer bays are three-light mullioned windows, with the central lights higher. Elsewhere, there is another doorway with tie-stone jambs, mullioned windows, and a blocked attic window.	II
24, 26, 28 and 30 Northgate, Baildon; 53.85427°N 1.76643°W		Late 18th century	Two cottages combined into one, and a house to the right, forming a T-shaped plan, all later used as shops. They are in stone, rendered on the front, with quoins, stone slate roofs, and two storeys. The cottages have paired doorways with chamfered surrounds in the centre with an open gabled porch, and the windows are sashes, some with mullions. To the right is a passage entry, and at the rear is a wing and an outshut. The house has a gable end facing the street, and this contains a shop front in the ground floor and a single-light window above. At the rear are mullioned windows.	II
Bunkers Hill; 53.85788°N 1.72870°W		Late 18th century	A terrace of estate cottages, in sandstone, with a stone slate roof, and two storeys. The doorways have plain surrounds, some of the windows are mullioned, some have single lights, and two cottages have Venetian windows.	II
Cunliffe House; 53.85772°N 1.73028°W	—	Late 18th century	An estate farmhouse in sandstone, with rusticated quoins, a band, a moulded gutter cornice on consoles, and a stone slate roof. There are two storeys and a central doorway with square jambs. The windows are mullioned, with three lights.	II
Barn southwest of Cunliffe House; 53.85749°N 1.73049°W	—	Late 18th century	A field barn in sandstone, with quoins, a stone slate roof, and two storeys. It contains a segmental archway, and a hay loft entrance in the upper floor at the rear.	II
L-shaped block, St Leonard's Farm; 53.85887°N 1.72589°W	—	Late 18th century	The block consists of a barn and mistal at right angles in sandstone with stone slate roofs. The barn contains a segmental archway and ventilation slits, and there are plain openings in the mistal.	II
Upper Esholt Farm, mistal and barn 53.85783°N 1.72803°W	—	Late 18th century	A house and a cottage, a mistal and a barn, they are in sandstone, with quoins and a stone slate roof. The house and cottage have doorways with squared jambs, and the windows are mullioned.	II
10 Church Lane, Esholt; 53.85830°N 1.72471°W	—	c. 1800	A cottage in sandstone, with a stone slate roof, two storeys and two bays. The windows, which are mullioned, and the doorway have plain surrounds.	II
22 and 24 Esholt Lane, Esholt; 53.85752°N 1.72817°W	—	c. 1800	A pair of sandstone estate cottages with a stone slate roof and two storeys. The doorways have square jambs, some windows have single lights, and the others are mullioned with two lights.	II
High View House; 53.85967°N 1.72353°W	—	c. 1800	A cottage in gritstone with quoins and a stone slate roof. There are two storeys, three bays, a later rear extension, and outshuts at the rear and on the east. On the front is a gabled porch, and the windows are mullioned with three lights.	II
Upper Mill Cottages; 53.85639°N 1.73189°W		c. 1800	A row of former weavers' cottages, one converted into a sports club, they are in sandstone with quoins, a gutter eaves cornice on consoles, a stone slate roof, and two storeys. The doorways have squared jambs, and most of the windows are mullioned.	II
14 Low Fold, Baildon; 53.85496°N 1.76746°W	—	Late 18th to early 19th century	A stone cottage that has a stone slate roof with a coped front-facing gable and kneelers. There are three storeys and one bay. In the gable end is a doorway with monolithic jambs, a single-light window to the left, and a sash window above. In the right return is a former taking-in door converted into a window, and more windows, one of which is mullioned.	II
Butler House; 53.85229°N 1.76428°W	—	Late 18th to early 19th century	A stone house on a plinth, with quoins, sill bands, a moulded eaves cornice, and a stone slate roof with coped gables. There are two storeys, a double depth plan, and a symmetrical front of three bays. The central doorway has pilasters, a fanlight, an entablature, and an open pediment. Over the doorway is a single-light window, and the other windows are mullioned with two lights. To the left of the door is a re-used dated and initialled plaque.	II
High View, 2 Station Road, Esholt; 53.85962°N 1.72321°W	—	Late 18th to early 19th century	Two cottages, later combined, they are the rebuild of an earlier building and incorporate parts of it, including a retaining wall in the left gable end. It is in sandstone with a stone slate roof and two storeys. The two central doorways have squared jambs, and on the front are mullioned windows. At the rear are five 17th-century windows in the upper floor, and the lower floor contains three single-light windows.	II
High View, 3 and 4 Station Road, Esholt; 53.85948°N 1.72304°W	—	Late 18th to early 19th century	A pair of cottages, they are the rebuild of an earlier building and incorporate parts of it, including quoins. They are in sandstone with stone slate roofs, and each cottage is gabled. There are two storeys, and to the right is a single-story extension. The doorways have squared jambs, and the windows are mullioned with three lights.	II
6 and 8 Main Street, Esholt; 53.85830°N 1.72362°W		c. 1800–20	A pair of sandstone estate cottages with a stone slate roof. The windows are casements, and on the front are later porches.	II
10–18 Main Street, Esholt; 53.85848°N 1.72382°W		c. 1800–20	A row of stone estate cottages with a stone slate roof and two storeys. The windows are two-light mullioned casements, and there are two lean-to porches and one gabled porch.	II
28 Main Street, Esholt; 53.85882°N 1.72447°W	—	c. 1800–20	A sandstone estate cottage with gutter brackets, a stone slate roof, and two storeys. The central doorway has square jambs, and there are two three-light mullioned windows in each floor.	II
Holme House; 53.85766°N 1.72715°W	—	c. 1800–20	A sandstone house with a moulded cornice, a blocking course, and a stone slate roof with coped gables, hipped over the wing. There are two storeys, a main block with a symmetrical front of three bays, and a wing on the right with two bays. The doorway has a moulded surround, a fanlight and a pediment, and the windows are sashes.	II
3–11 Main Street, Esholt; 53.85822°N 1.72383°W	—	c. 1820–30	A row of five sandstone estate cottages with sill bands, bracketed eaves, and a stone slate roof. There are two storeys, and each cottage has two bays. The doorways in the right bays have square jambs and fanlights, and in each cottage is a two-light mullioned window in the ground floor, and two casement windows in the upper floor.	II
2 and 4 Brook Hill, Baildon; 53.84966°N 1.76115°W		Early 19th century	A pair of mirror-image cottages, in stone, with a stone slate roof and two storeys. Each house has a doorway in the outer part with tie-stone jambs, a two-light millioned window in the ground floor and two single-light windows in the upper floor.	II
14 Church Lane and smithy, Esholt; 53.85848°N 1.72486°W	—	Early 19th century	A cottage and attached smithy, the smithy being the earlier, and the cottage added in 1830–40. They are in stone with stone slate roofs. The cottage has two storeys, a central doorway, and casement windows. The smithy to the left, which has been converted for residential use, has a single storey, and contains two doorways and multi-paned windows.	II
1 Cunliffe Lane, Esholt; 53.85753°N 1.72826°W	—	Early 19th century	A house in sandstone, with a stone slate roof, two storeys, two bays, and a lean-to extension on the right. It contains a single-light window, two two-light mullioned windows, and a doorway, all with plain surrounds.	II
Boggart House; 53.85634°N 1.71427°W	—	Early 19th century	An estate cottage in sandstone, on a plinth, with chamfered quoins, a band, and a stone slate roof with coped gables. There are two storeys, two bays, and a single-storey outbuilding. The doorway has a cornice, and the windows are mullioned with three lights.	II
The Old Mill Restaurant; 53.85317°N 1.76667°W		Early 19th century	The textile mill and warehouse, later used for other purposes, is in stone with a modillioned eaves cornice, and a stone slate roof. There are three storeys, a basement and an attic, and a symmetrical front of three bays. The middle bay contains loading doors, the lower two of which have been converted, and in the outer bays are single-light windows. The right return has a coped gable and, with the cornice, forms a pediment.	II
The Woolpack public house 53.85865°N 1.72404°W		c. 1830	The public house is in sandstone with a stone slate roof. There are two storeys and a symmetrical front of three bays. In the centre is a doorway with squared jambs, above it is a sash window, and in the outer bays are two-light mullioned sash windows.	II
1, 3 and 5 Chapel Lane, Esholt; 53.85831°N 1.72499°W		c. 1830–40	A row of three stone estate cottages with a half-hipped stone slate roof. The cottages have two storeys and two bays each. The doorways have plain surrounds, there are two single-light windows, and the other windows are mullioned with two lights, and some mullions removed.	II
2–8 and 8A Church Lane, Esholt; 53.85749°N 1.72414°W		c. 1830–40	A row of sandstone estate cottages with eaves gutter brackets, a stone slate roof, and two storeys. In the ground floor are two-light mullioned windows, the upper floor contains casement windows, and the doorways have plain surrounds.	II
Four-storey mill warehouse 53.85454°N 1.76690°W	—	Early to mid 19th century	The warehouse is in stone with a corrugated iron roof and four storeys. The gable end facing the street has three bays. In the ground floor are two semicircular-headed cart entries, one blocked, and above them is a band. In the middle bay the upper floors each contains a loading door, and in the outer bays are windows. The left return contains four bays of windows, and in the right return are five bays of windows in the lower two floors and seven in the top floor.	II
Milestone, Charlestown; 53.84339°N 1.76115°W		Early to mid 19th century	The milestone is on the north side of Otley Road (A6038 road), and consists of a stone with a triangular section. It is inscribed with the distances to Otley and Bradford.	II
Milestone, Tong Park; 53.85337°N 1.74423°W		Early to mid 19th century	The milestone is on the northwest side of Otley Road (A6038 road), and consists of a stone with a triangular section. It is inscribed with the distances to Otley and Bradford.	II
Moorfield; 53.85513°N 1.76655°W	—	Early to mid 19th century	A stone house with an eaves band, gutter brackets, and a stone slate roof with coped gables and kneelers. There are two storeys, a double-depth plan, a symmetrical front of three bays, and a rear extension. The central doorway has pilasters, an entablature, and a dentilled cornice. The windows are sashes, and in the left return is a semicircular-headed stair window with impost blocks and a keystone.	II
13–21 Main Street, Esholt; 53.85840°N 1.72420°W		c. 1840	A row of sandstone estate cottages with paired eaves brackets, a stone slate roof, and two storeys. The doorways have squared jambs, and the windows are casements.	II
22, 24 and 26 Main Street, Esholt; 53.85870°N 1.72421°W	—	c. 1840	A group of sandstone estate cottages with gutter brackets, a stone slate roof, and two storeys. The doorways have squared jambs, and the windows are casements.	II
The Vicarage, Esholt; 53.85713°N 1.72475°W	—	c. 1840	A sandstone house, with a fretted eaves board, and a hipped slate roof. There are two storeys, a square plan, and three bays on each front. The windows are sashes with thin lintels, and there is a large round-headed stair window at the rear.	II
St Paul's Church, Esholt; 53.85713°N 1.72426°W		1840–42	A small church designed by Anthony Salvin, it is in sandstone with a stone slate roof. The church consists of a nave, a gabled south porch, and a short chancel. At the west end is a corbelled-out chimney, which also acts as a bellcote. Along the sides of the church are paired lancet windows with hood moulds.	II
Sexton's Lodge; 53.85728°N 1.72448°W	—	1846	The lodge at the entrance to the churchyard of St Paul's Church is in sandstone on a plinth, with quoins, and octagonal chimneys as finials. There is a single storey and a T-shaped plan, with a rear wing. On the front is a gabled porch, and the doorway has a dated and initialled lintel. The windows are chamfered and mullioned, they contain diamond-leaded casements, and have hood moulds.	II
St John's Church, Baildon; 53.85289°N 1.76443°W		1847–48	The church is in Early English style, and in 1928 the tower, in Perpendicular style, was added. The church is built in stone with a stone slate roof, and consists of a nave, a west porch, a south aisle under a separate roof, a chancel, and a south tower. The tower has three stages, diagonal buttresses, a stair tower in the angle with the aisle, and an embattled parapet. On the west gable of the nave is a bellcote containing a circular window and a clock face.	II
23 Main Street and 12 Church Lane, Esholt; 53.85839°N 1.72468°W	—	c. 1850	A pair of houses on a corner site, they are in sandstone, with consoles to the gutters, and a stone slate roof. There are two storeys and the lower storey is splayed on the corner. The doorways on the fronts have cornices on consoles, there is another door in the splayed corner, and the windows are casements.	II
St James' Church; 53.84695°N 1.75183°W		Mid to late 19th century	The church, which was moved to its present site in about 1905, is timber framed with weatherboarding and a pantile roof. It consists of a nave, a gabled south porch, a chancel, and a gabled transeptal chapel. On the west end is a belfry tower with a pyramidal roof. The west and east windows have four lights with traceried heads.	II
Baildon Moravian Church; 53.85245°N 1.76668°W		1868	The church is in stone with a blue slate roof, and is in Gothic Revival style. In the north gable end is a doorway with a pointed arch, chamfered jambs, and a cusped lintel, and it is flanked by cusped lancet windows. The gable is coped with kneelers, and has a bellcote. On the sides are four bays with two-light windows, and in the roof are gabled vents.	II
East Lodge, Roberts Park; 53.84070°N 1.78920°W		c. 1870	The lodge was designed by Mawson and Lockwood, and is in Italianate style. It is in stone with a Welsh slate roof, one storey, and a T-shaped plan. There is an open porch with a semicircular arch on Corinthian columns and floral decoration in the spandrels, and on the gable end is a hooded bellcote. The windows are round-arched sashes with pointed-arched hood moulds and imposts forming a continuous string course. In the right return is a semicircular bay window containing three arched windows with Doric columns as mullions.	II
East Shelter, Roberts Park; 53.84087°N 1.78910°W		1870	The shelter was designed by Mawson and Lockwood. It is in stone with a hipped Welsh blue slate roof and a wooden entrance surround. At the sides are pilasters with floral decoration, above is a moulded cornice, and it contains three wooden arches with drop finials and cusped roundels in the spandrels.	II
North Shelter, Roberts Park; 53.84179°N 1.79128°W		1870	The shelter was designed by Mawson and Lockwood. It is in stone with a hipped Welsh blue slate roof and a wooden entrance surround. At the sides are pilasters with floral decoration, above is a moulded cornice. It contains three wooden arches, the central arch higher, the outer arches with drop finials, and there are cusped roundels in the spandrels.	II
Tea room, balustrade and steps, Roberts Park; 53.84113°N 1.79155°W		1870	The building was designed by Mawson and Lockwood, and is in stone. It has a semicircular plan, and contains six doorways with monolithic jambs, between projections with rusticated quoins. In the centre is a drinking fountain in an arched recess. There is an entablature, a cornice, and a balustrade with five circles over each doorway. The building is flanked by flights of steps with balustrades.	II
West Shelter, Roberts Park; 53.84148°N 1.79338°W		1870	The shelter was designed by Mawson and Lockwood. It is in stone with a hipped Welsh blue slate roof and a wooden entrance surround. At the sides are pilasters with floral decoration, above is a moulded cornice, and it contains three wooden arches with drop finials and cusped roundels in the spandrels.	II
Ferniehurst Farm; 53.84206°N 1.76954°W	—	1860s to 1870s	A small model farm consisting of buildings in sandstone with slate roofs. The main group of buildings forms an L-shaped plan, with two ranges at right angles, and there is a detached cattle pen and piggery. Most of the buildings have a single storey.	II
Langley House; 53.85104°N 1.75608°W	—	1877	A large house in brick and stucco with hipped slate roofs, and in Italianate style. There are two storeys, a moulded plinth, a band, and a bracketed entablature. In the centre of the entrance front is a two-storey porch with a fluted Doric door surround, a pediment, and double doors with a fanlight. To the left is a square bay window with a balustrade, and to the right is a canted bay window with a balustrade, a large segmental pediment and an open pediment above. The garden front has eight bays with bay windows, sash windows and a projecting wing with a bow window.	II
Stable block and cottage, Langley House; 53.85090°N 1.75429°W	—	1889	The former stable block and the cottage are in stone with slate roofs, and form a U-shaped plan. The north range has two storeys, and contains the stables, with doorways and mullioned windows, and is surmounted by a cupola. The east range has a single storey, it contains the carriage houses, and has three pairs of double doors, and a steel and glass canopy. The south range contains a two-storey cottage. Its entrance front has a canted bay window, and a doorway with a chamfered surround. The upper floor projects on brackets, and contains a mullioned window with an openwork gable above. In the south front is a triangular bay window with an ogee cap. At the entrance on the west side are ornate gate piers with iron lamps flanked by ramped coped walls.	II
Sandal First School; 53.84865°N 1.76962°W		1893–94	The school is in stone with sill bands, and a tile roof with coped gables and ball finials. There are two storeys, a front of six bays with two gables, recessed side wings, and paired rear wings. The windows are mullioned, or mullioned and transomed, and some have single lights.	II
Roundwood Grange; 53.85129°N 1.75109°W	—	1898	A stone house on a plinth, with a string course, and a stone slate roof with coped gables, kneelers, lantern finials, and a parapet. There are two storeys and an attic, and a U-shaped plan consisting of a hall range and projecting gabled wings. In the hall range is an elliptical-headed doorway with voussoirs and a moulded impost. Some windows are mullioned, some are mullioned and transomed, and some have single lights.	II
Woodlands; 53.85244°N 1.75279°W	—	1899	A large house, later divided, it is in stone with quoins, and a stone slate roof with coped gables, kneelers and finials. There are two storeys, and a U-shaped plan consisting of a hall range and projecting cross-wings. The wings contain two-storey canted bay windows, and in the hall range are mullioned and transomed windows in the ground floor, mullioned windows in the upper floor, and a scalloped parapet. In the left return is a segmental-arched doorway with a moulded and chamfered surround, Ionic pilasters, an entablature, and a triangular pediment with a heraldic shield in the tympanum.	II
Gate piers, walls and lodge, Woodlands; 53.85165°N 1.75336°W		c. 1899	The lodge at the entrance to the drive is in stone with a moulded eaves cornice at the rear, and a slate roof with coped gables, giant kneelers, and ball finials. The lodge is in Jacobethan style, and has a single storey and an L-shaped plan. The gabled wing to the left has an oriel window containing mullioned windows. There is an open porch and a doorway with a chamfered surround and a shaped lintel. Each gate pier has a plinth, triple pilasters, a moulded capital, a carved motif, and a cornice. The flanking walls are curved, they have coping with voussoirs, and end in piers with ball finials.	II
Statue of Sir Titus Salt, Roberts Park; 53.84116°N 1.79154°W		1903	The statue of Sir Titus Salt is by F. Derwent Wood. It is in bronze, on a stone base, and depicts a standing figure holding a parchment. On the rear is an inscribed bronze plaque, and on the sides are carvings in low relief of an Angora goat and an alpaca.	II
Hoyle Court; 53.85001°N 1.75122°W	—	1912	A large stone house with a hipped stone slate roof in Edwardian Baroque style. There are two storeys with attics, a symmetrical front of eleven bays, and a U-shaped plan with projecting wings. The wings have quoins, windows with decorative surrounds, and a shaped gabled dormer with a keyed oculus. The hall range has a central doorway with a Gibbs surround and a triple keystone, windows, some with pediments, and a parapet with a Lombard frieze rising over a central urn. At the rear is a porch and doorway with Ionic pilasters, an architrave, a triple keystone, a pulvinated frieze, a cornice, an open triangular pediment, and a parapet with an urn.	II
Esholt Memorial Institute; 53.85822°N 1.72329°W	—	1920–21	The hall is built in re-used stone and rendered, and has a stone slate roof. There is one storey and a rectangular plan, with a wing to the left, a porch in the angle, and a lean-to on the right. The porch is approached by five splayed steps, above the door is an inscribed tablet with the names of four men, and the dates of the First World War. Above this is a shaped parapet, the windows are multi-paned, and there are dormers in the roof space.	II
Telephone kiosk 53.85847°N 1.72429°W		1935	The telephone kiosk is outside the POst Office, 21 Main Street, Esholt. It is of the K6 type, designed by Giles Gilbert Scott. Constructed in cast iron with a square plan and a dome, it has unperforated crowns in the top panels.	II
