= Shipley Glen Tramway =

Tramway in West Yorkshire, England

Coordinates: 53.84256°N 1.79023°W

Operation
- Locale: Shipley Glen, West Yorkshire, England
- Open: 18 May 1895
- Status: Operational
- Lines: 1
- Operator: Shipley Glen Tramway Preservation Co Ltd

Infrastructure
- Track gauge: 20 in (508 mm)
- Propulsion system: Electric (since 1920)
- Stock: 2 tramcars

Statistics
- Track length (double): 440 yards (400 m)
- Route length: 440 yards (400 m)

The lower station of the funicular is some 660 feet (200 m) by foot from Saltaire railway station, and a similar distance from the historic Salts Mill, now occupied by shops and restaurants as well as the David Hockney gallery.

== Operation ==
The line is operated by volunteer staff on behalf of a charitable trust, Shipley Glen Tramway Preservation Co Ltd.

The Shipley Glen Tramway is a preserved cable funicular tramway located in the wooded area of Shipley Glen near the town of Baildon and the village of Saltaire, West Yorkshire, England.

== History ==
The line was opened on 18 May 1895 by Sam Wilson, a local publican, showman and entrepreneur. It was intended to ease access to a number of other, now long closed, attractions at Shipley Glen, including a wooden toboggan ride and a massive fairground. As built, the line was powered by a gas engine. Since 1920 the line has been electrically operated.

In 2002, operation of the line was taken over by a charitable trust under a lease from Bradford Council. The tramway was temporarily closed in 2010, to bring it up to modern safety standards. This involved fitting the two tramcars with new chassis, wheels and decks, and improving braking systems on both cars and haulage drum. The line reopened in 2011.

== See also ==
- List of funicular railways
