= Jesus Man of Bradford =

Religious figure in Bradford, West Yorkshire

- Born: Geoffrey Brindley; 1926/1927; Buxton
- Died: 24 August 2015; Bradford
- Website: www.bradfordjesusman.co.uk

Geoffrey Brindley, known locally as the Jesus Man of Bradford, was a well-known figure in the city of Bradford, West Yorkshire. For over 50 years, Brindley would walk the streets of Bradford dressed in a monk's habit and sandals waving hello and smiling to people wherever he went.

== Life ==
According to local legend, Geoffrey Brindley gave up his job as a machinist to live in a cave near Settle in order to receive a message from God. He spent 12 days in the cave before setting off to Bradford wearing a habit. After moving to Bradford he would spend his days walking the streets and became such a popular figure around the city that he regularly stopped at homes where his hosts served him a cooked dinner.

During his early life as a Christian, Mr Brindley is thought to have been arrested for causing a breach of the peace outside a bingo club whilst preaching about gambling and protesting about a Beatles concert.

In 2011, a petition nominating Bradford Jesus Man to carry the Olympic torch amassed over 23,000 signatures.

After his death, £2,000 was raised to build a statue of him in Baildon.

== Death ==
Geoffrey Brindley died in 2015 at the age of 88. He suffered a stroke and subsequently fell down the stairs at his home, leaving him hospitalised. With little known about him, a request was put out in the town of Buxton to find any relatives. At his funeral, hundreds of people lined the streets near Bradford Cathedral to pay their respects.
