= Sir James Roberts, 1st Baronet =

Sir James Roberts (1848–1935) was a Yorkshire industrialist and businessman. He was born at Lane Ends in the parish of Oakworth, Yorkshire on 30 September 1848. He was one of eleven children of a weaver who became a tenant farmer. His parents were illiterate but determined that their children would receive an education

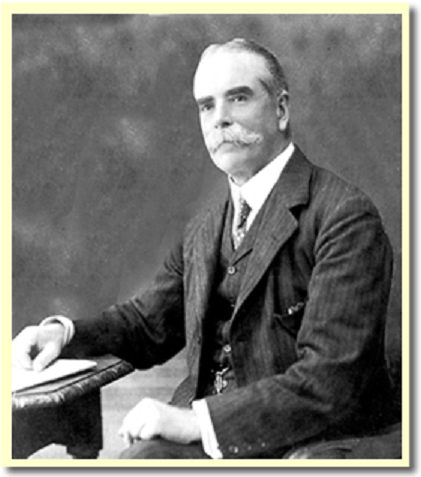
Sir James Roberts

== Early life and education ==
Roberts attended the local school at Haworth, where he learnt to read and write. As a boy he is said to have known Charlotte Brontë. He attended a school established by her father, the Rev Patrick Bronte. He left school at eleven to become a part-time millworker in Oxenhope, and two years later was apprenticed at William Greenwood's mill there. Initially recorded as a worsted spinner, at the age of 24 years he became manager of the mill. In 1873 he set up a wool and top merchant company with his cousin Joe Feather at premises in Palmerston buildings, Manor Row Bradford and soon achieved commercial success.

== Personal life ==
On 14 May 1873 at All Saints' Church, Bingley, he married Elizabeth Foster (1852–1935).

James and Elizabeth had 6 children, 4 sons and 2 daughters. They experienced several family tragedies. During Roberts' early years as a director at Salts Mill his eldest son (James William) contracted tuberculosis and died aged 24 years. His second son (Bertram Foster) became an important co-director at Salts Mill but died suddenly at 36 years of age. His youngest son (John Edward) died aged 11 years when he was swept into the sea whilst fishing on a family holiday at Port Rush, Ireland. His only remaining son (Joseph Henry) was refused exemption from army service during World War One and was seriously injured in France in 1917. He was not fit to return to support his father in managing the Salt Business.

His eldest daughter Alice eloped with Norman Rutherford, a medical student, on 27 August 1902 marrying in Scotland. He became a war hero earning the DSO in 1917. On 13 January 1919 Rutherford shot and killed Major Miles Seton who was seeing Alice while he was away. At his trial Rutherford was found guilty but insane and sent to Broadmoor. While in Broadmoor he wrote An Outline History of the Great War anonymously.

== Business ==
In 1892 the well-known firm of Sir Titus Salt, Sons and Co went into voluntary liquidation and Roberts was one of a consortium of local businessmen who purchased the concern. Within eight years he was the sole owner. The business prospered markedly under his management. The consortium of four local businessmen included Isaac Smith (1832-1909); John Rhodes (1821-1913); John Maddocks (1840-1924) and James Roberts. Rhodes an owner of coal mines in South Yorkshire was the main financier for the purchase of the company.

Smith and Maddocks continued to operate their own textile businesses after the purchase. In 1898, Maddocks sold his shares in the company to Rhodes and Roberts, followed quickly by a transfer of shares by Isaac Smith to Rhodes and Roberts later in the same year. Rhodes remained as a director until 1901, resigning after a protest about increased salaries awarded to James and Bertram Forster Roberts, who became sole owners of the business. From 1901 the bank balance sheets for the company increased exponentially from around £20,000 to over £130,000 after Roberts and his son Bertram had become sole owners of the business.

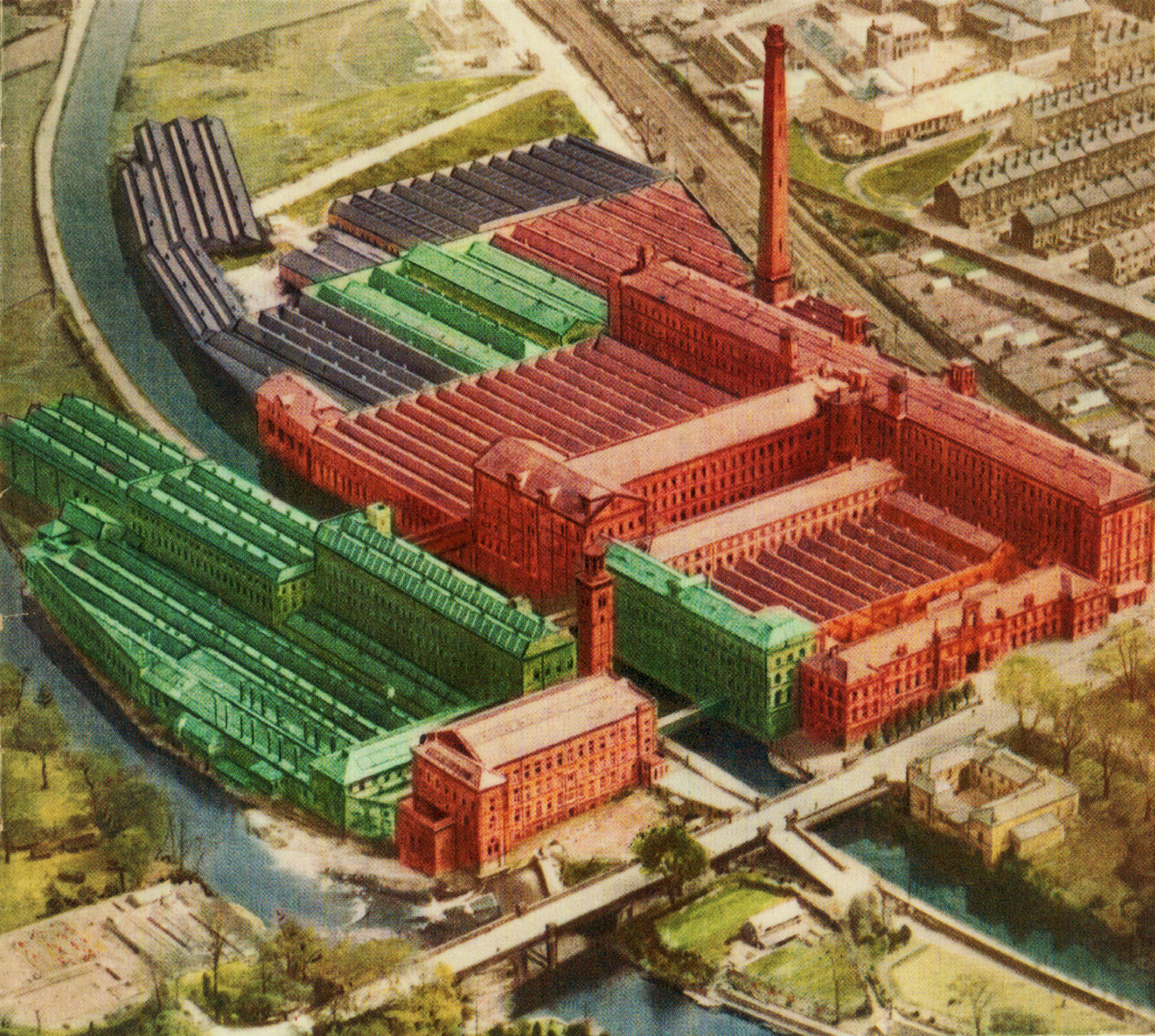
Salts Mill Extension (in green)

James Roberts chose not to change the name of the company founded by Sir Titus Salt. He was an admirer of Salt, commissioning Salts Statue in Saltaire Park in 1903. He was instrumental in extending the mill by a third in size and in providing work for 4,000 employees.

He was active in many aspects of public affairs in Saltaire and sustained annual payments to all the charitable bodies founded by Sir Titus Salt. He did not collect rents for Saltaire residencies if workers were placed on short time. He purchased a new cricket pavilion for Saltaire Cricket Club and purchased ‘War Bonds’ for his workers during World war One. The only memorial to him in Saltaire is due to his request to re-name Saltaire Park, when he gifted this to Bradford Council in 1920, as a memorial to his son Bertram Foster Roberts. The park is now named Roberts Park.

As part of his business activities Roberts travelled extensively abroad. He went to Russia many times and learnt to speak Russian. But his business interests suffered badly as a result of the Revolution. This meant a visit to his bankers in London, where the bank official he met was TS Eliot. This is said to have caused the poet's reference in his poem The Waste Land to "a silk hat on a Bradford millionaire".

Roberts' 'Salts Company' business had suffered throughout World War One, due to supplies of dye products from Germany being cut off and loss of trade with Russia from 1917. He managed to continue to achieve healthy profits at Salts Mil when, worn out with family troubles and business difficulties, he put the company up for sale.

When Roberts sold the Salts Mill company in 1918, it was for the sum of £2,000,000. The business, still named Sir Titus Salt (Bart) Sons and Co. Ltd. was purchased by a symposium of Bradford ‘woolmen’ that included Sir James Hill. The first directors were Arthur Hill, Ernest Henry Gates and Sir Henry Whitehead. Sir Frank Sanderson was appointed Chairman of the company shortly afterward.

The business then experienced a serious downturn in profit after 1920, due in part to the worldwide economic collapse, but recovered well after a flotation as Salts (Saltaire) Ltd. In 1923 and the sale of Saltaire Village in 1933 to the Bradford Property Trust. Its managing director from this point in time was Robert Whyte Guild and in 1957 the company reported record profits of £1,208,261. In 1957 the business was subject to a surprise takeover by Illingworth, Morris.

The public life of Roberts was also distinguished. In 1897 he became a member of the Urban District Council for Shipley, West Yorkshire, eventually becoming chairman of that council. He was also a member of the County Council for the West Riding of Yorkshire and a Justice of the Peace. In 1909 he was created a baronet in the King's Birthday honours. He was a keen advocate of free trade and was the first chairman of the West Riding Free Trade Federation. He endowed a leaving scholarship at Bingley Grammar School and the chair of Russian at Leeds University. He also bought Haworth Parsonage, which was opened to visitors in 1928 as the Brontë Parsonage Museum.

His philanthropy extended beyond Saltaire, for example - he purchased a large house in Harrogate for the Barnardo’s charity and subscribed generously to the Prince of Wales Fund. There is a Roberts Street in central Bradford and Roberts Park in Saltaire, is named as a memorial to his second son, Bertram Foster Roberts.

== Later life ==
In 1910 Sir James Roberts purchased Strathallan Castle from the Earl of Perth. Roberts retired to the south of England, whilst also maintaining Strathallan Castle in Scotland. As of 2021 the Roberts family still has Strathallan Castle which is rented as function and event space. He died in 1935. He was buried in Fairlight in East Sussex.

Baronetage of the United Kingdom
New creation	Baronet (of Milner Field); 1909–1935	Succeeded by James Denby Roberts
