= Roberts Park, Saltaire =

Public park in West Yorkshire, England

Roberts Park
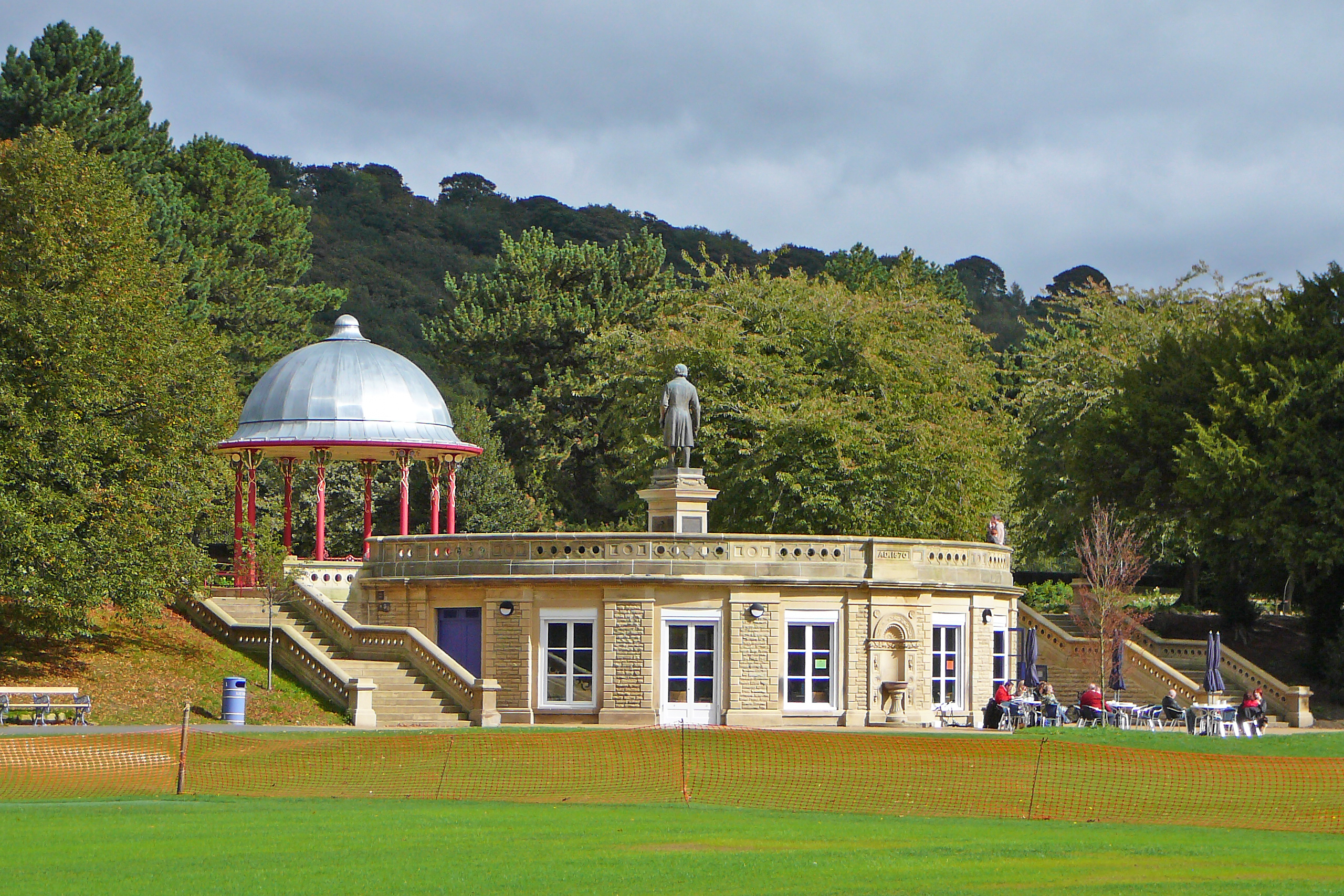
- Bandstand, statue and Half Moon Pavilion
- Interactive map of Roberts Park
- Type: Urban Park
- Location: Saltaire, Shipley, City of Bradford, West Yorkshire
- Nearest city: Bradford
- Coordinates: 53.841°N 1.791°W
- Area: 14 acres (5.7 ha)
- Created: 1871
- Opened: 25 July 1871
- Designer: William Gay
- Etymology: Named in memory of Bertram Foster Roberts
- Operator: City of Bradford, Parks and Landscape Services
- Visitors: up to 3,000 people per day
- Open: Open all year
- Status: Restored
- Awards: Green Flag Award

Roberts Park is a 14 acres (5.7 ha) public urban park in Saltaire, West Yorkshire, England. Higher Coach Road, Baildon, is to the north and the park is bounded to the south by the River Aire. A pedestrian footbridge crosses the Aire and links the park to the village of Saltaire. The park is an integral part of the Saltaire World Heritage site.

The park is grade II listed in English Heritage's Register of Parks and Gardens and is a Green Flag Award winner. Visitor numbers are estimated to be up to 3,000 people per day.

== History ==
The park was designed and laid out by William Gay (1814–1893) for Sir Titus Salt (1803–1876) and was opened on 25 July 1871 by Sir Titus, although conceived of as early as 1850. The park was named Saltaire Park but was known informally as The People's Park, and Salt's Park. The development included a widening and deepening of the River Aire for boating and swimming purposes, and for the construction of a boathouse on the southern bank of the river. In the centre of the park is a semi-circular pavilion designed by architects Lockwood and Mawson, constructed in 1870.

In 1891 the park was purchased by Sir James Roberts (1848–1935). In 1903 to commemorate the fifty years Salts Mill had been operating and the centenary of his birth, a bronze statue of Sir Titus Salt was erected by the main promenade commissioned by Roberts. The bronze statue was by Francis Derwent Wood RA (1871–1926) of Chelsea, London.

In 1910 the park was offered to Shipley Urban District Council by Sir James Roberts, leader of the council at the time, but later in 1920, after a dispute with the council this offer was rescinded. In 1920 Sir James Roberts named the park Roberts Park as a memorial to his second son Bertram Foster Roberts (1876–1912) when he gave the park to Bradford Council on 1 August that year.

The park was accessible from Saltaire village via Victoria Road on the Saltaire Bridge across the Aire but after showing signs of collapsing the bridge was demolished in 1967. Later the two were reconnected with an iron footbridge over the river. In 1971 Saltaire including Roberts Park was designated a conservation area and in December 2001, Saltaire including Roberts Park was designated a World Heritage Site by UNESCO. In 2009–10 the park was refurbished with help from lottery funds and other grants.

== Landmarks and refurbishment ==
The main entrances to the park are in the east by the lodge, and in the south east via a cast iron bridge. The park is divided by a long broad east–west promenade with east and west shelters at the ends. To the north of the promenade are serpentine paths and flower beds, and to the south a cricket ground and open playing field. At the centre of the park below the main promenade is the listed Lockwood and Mawson tea room pavilion housing the Half Moon Cafe operated by the cricket club. The cafe has Wi-Fi and adjacent toilet facilities. On either side of the Half Moon Pavilion are steps leading up to the promenade and a semi circular balustraded viewing platform on top of the pavilion. Centrally located in the few steps leading up to this platform from the promenade is the listed bronze statue of Sir Titus Salt.

To the north of the statue was the location of the original bandstand demolished during the Second World War. As part of the park refurbishment the bandstand was rebuilt, but to a different design and on a larger scale. To the north of the bandstand, located next to the north entrance is the North Shelter containing a poster exhibition of the park's history. After refurbishment the park was opened on 22 May 2010 with a bandstand concert from the Hammonds Saltaire Band. In the east of the park next to the East Shelter is the Park Lodge and main gates. The pavilion, park lodge and all three shelters are listed buildings and were designed by Lockwood and Mawson or in the case of the shelters, thought to be. The work included the refurbishment of the park shelters, pavilion, park lodge, and statue plus additional park furniture, signage, the reinstatement of the park railings, and the resurfacing of 3,700 m^{2} of footpaths with resin bonded gravel. A children's play area and a 280 m^{2} BMX skate park were created in the east of the park.

The park with the mills in the background

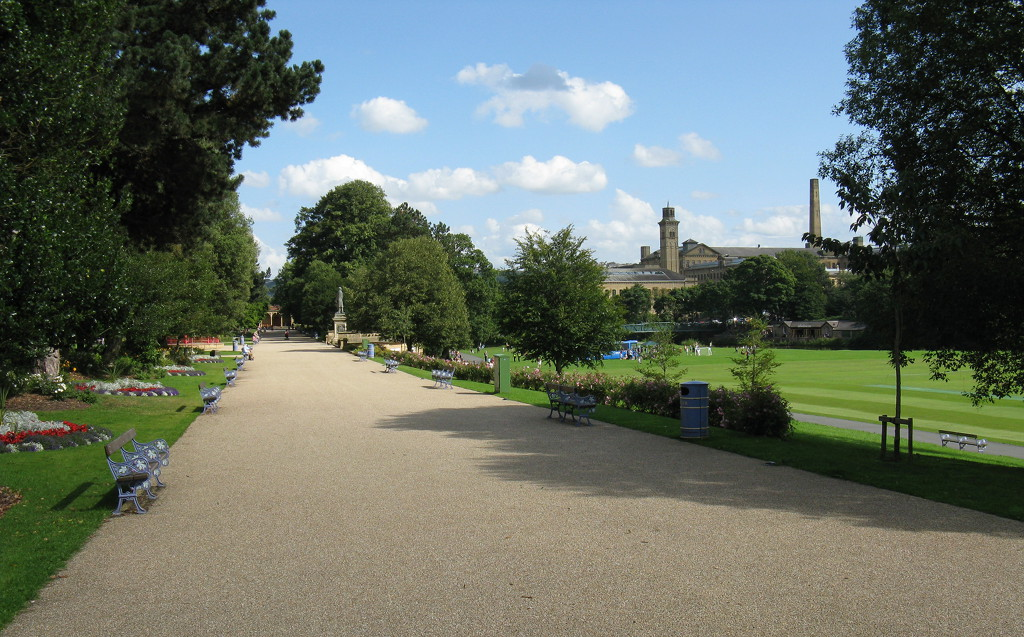
View along the main promenade

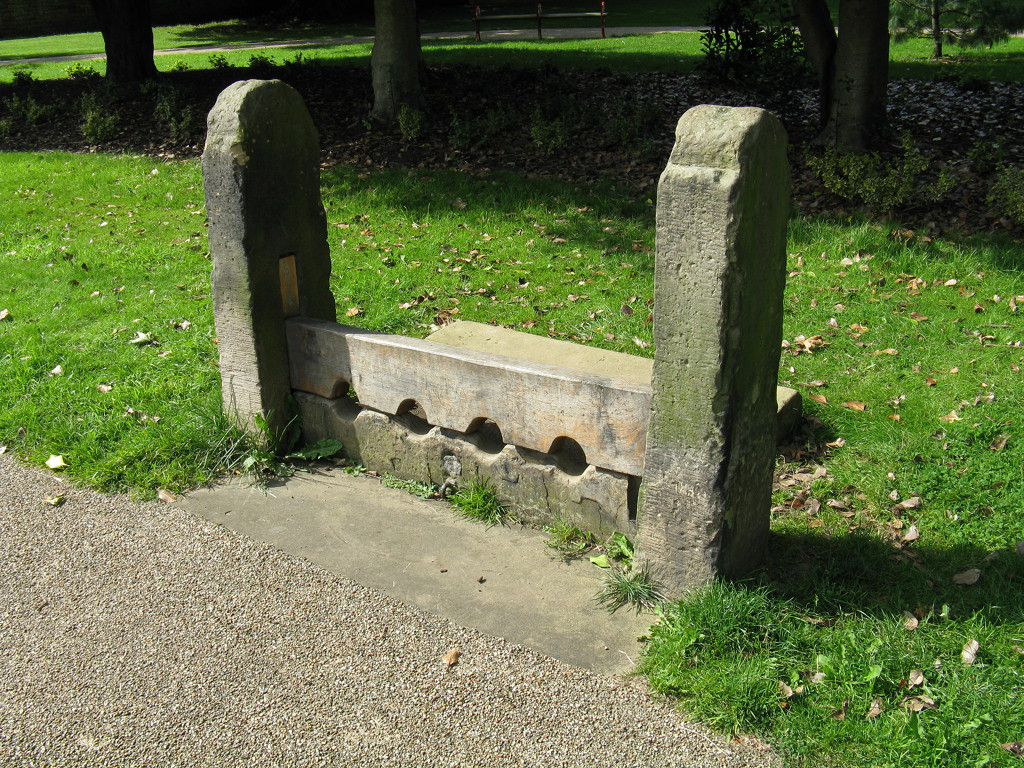
The stocks

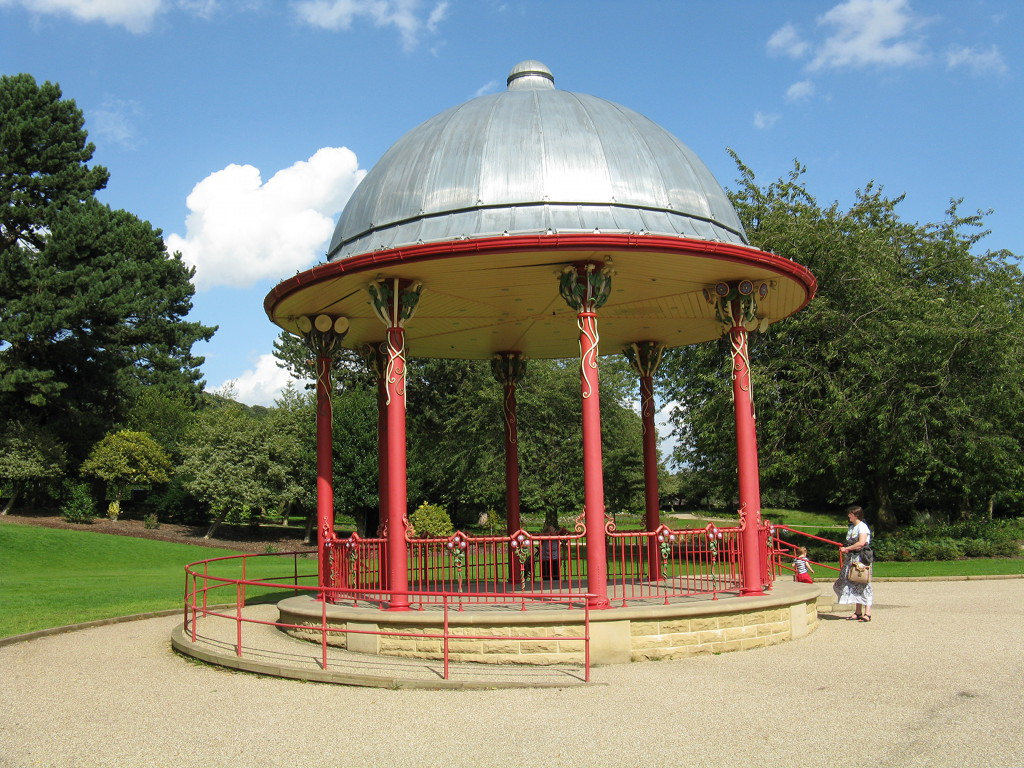
The bandstand

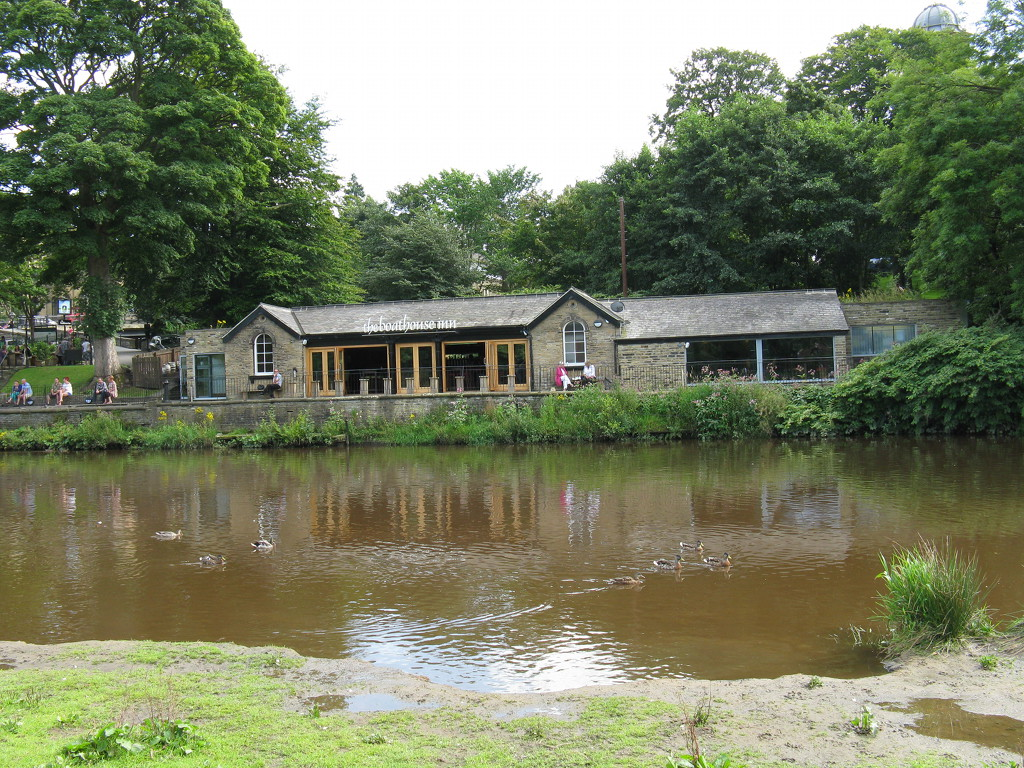
The former boathouse

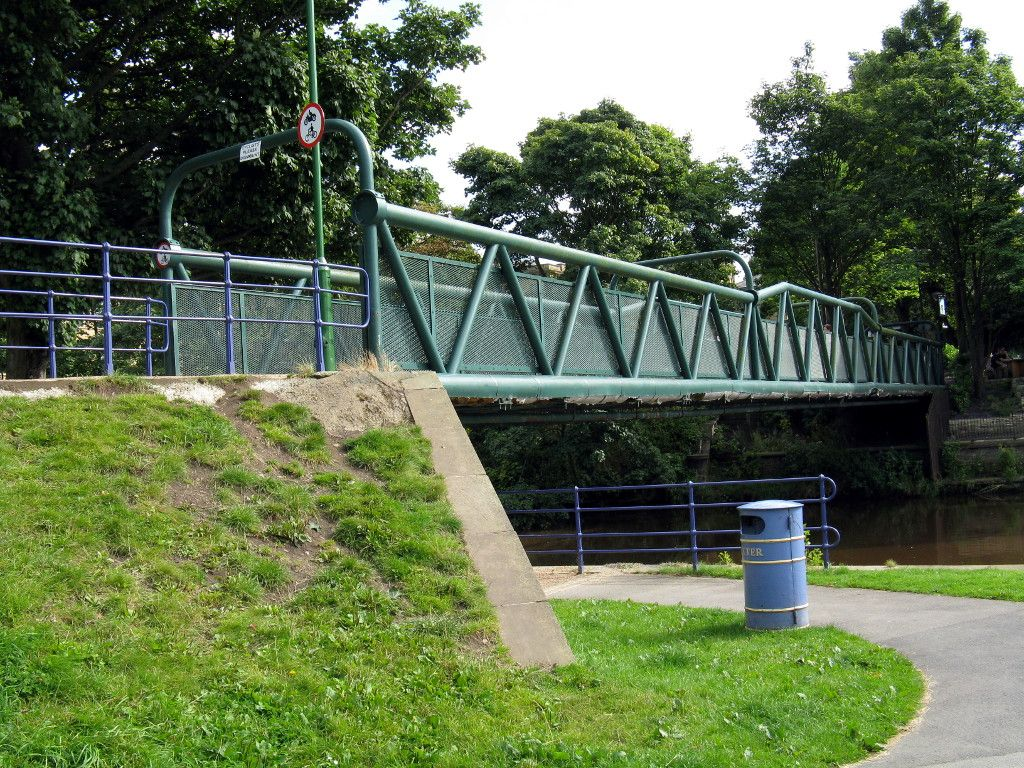
Iron bridge over the River Aire linking the mills and houses of Saltaire with Roberts Park

Statue of Titus Salt

A bench

The total cost of the refurbishment was £4.5 million with £3.2 million coming from the Heritage Lottery Fund, £1.2 million from Bradford Council, and £0.1 million from other sources. Work on restoration was started in February 2009 and completed in April 2010.

== See also ==
- Listed buildings in Baildon
