= Warhurst =

Warhurst is a surname. Notable people with the surname include:

- Blane Warhurst (born 1961), US international rugby union player
- David Warhurst (1938–2021), British scientist
- Don Warhurst (1920–2001), American football coach and college athletics administrator
- John Warhurst (athlete) (born 1944), British athlete
- John Warhurst (academic) (born 1948), Australian academic and republican activist
- John Warhurst (sound editor), British music and sound supervisor
- Matt Warhurst (born 1975), Canadian musician and record producer
- Myf Warhurst (born 1974), Australian broadcaster
- Nina Warhurst (born 1980), British journalist
- Pamela Warhurst (born 1950), British Incredible Edible cofounder
- Paul Warhurst (born 1969), English footballer
- Ron Warhurst (born 1942), American sports coach and Purple Heart recipient
- Roy Warhurst (1926–2014), English footballer
- Sam Warhurst (1907–1981), English footballer
- Tom Warhurst Sr. (1917–2004), Australian tennis player
- Tom Warhurst Jr. (born 1963), Australian rules footballer
