= Austerity urbanism =

Urban planning paradigm

Austerity urbanism is a relatively recent notion that refers to urban planning projects emerging from crisis situations. Such initiatives are often temporary, informal and citizen-led as well as taking place in unused, if not abandoned, urban spaces.

== Definitions ==
Austerity urbanism can be described in several ways and gathers different components. The following lines present the main definitions and interpretations of the concept.

First, austerity urbanism is based upon two main notions: austerity and urbanism.

Generally speaking, austerity is “a situation in which people’s living standards are reduced because of economic difficulties”. Austerity is also described as “a condition of enforced or extreme economy” . Here, austerity refers to the reduction of investment, as well as expenditure in general, by the state due to an economy in jeopardy.

Recent episodes of austerity are often linked with neoliberalism, which is the latest form of capitalism. Its main idea is to restrict the power of public institutions as well as government spending and to give precedence to the market economy, in order to increase the role of the private sector in the society as well as maintain public sectors in good financial health. Given that the private sector is in charge in the neoliberal system, public expenditures are less likely to occur. This is what leading to austerity in bad economic times.

Second, austerity urbanism is a type of urbanism that shows the repercussions of austerity. The critical situation of the economy has a significant effect on the development of cities. Investors, due to economic crisis and lack of attractive investment options, reduce the amount of money they invest in cities, leaving neighborhoods or entire cities worse off. In other words, an episode of austerity may leave municipalities with no alternative but the lack of investment of private actors, and create difficulties to manage the development of their cities. Moreover, the possibility for actors from the private sector to withdraw at any moment puts municipalities in a position where they may not have the means to manage their urban development themselves.

Finally, austerity urbanism happens when the private sector reduces its investment. Due to the lack of funds of the municipalities, neighborhoods are at risk of not receiving proper investment. At that point, individuals or local associations may take control and launch their own urban initiatives in places neglected by municipalities. This process often leads to attracting, once again, the private sector after those places have been reshaped for temporary use by the local community. In the meantime, the actions of local communities work as transitional uses before future developments.

== Origins ==
To understand the emergence of austerity urbanism, it is necessary to explore first the notion of austerity and its impacts throughout history as austerity urbanism appears later as a consequence of such a context.

The notion of austerity is not new in the history of humankind, but as an explicit concept, it did not start until the beginning of the 20th century. The economist John Maynard Keynes was amongst the first ones to use it. In the wake of World War I, he made known his disagreement on the Treaty of Versailles, opining that it was not a good idea to impose an economy of austerity on Germany. He argued that it would also weaken other countries in Europe. The risk was also that the impoverishment of Germany could raise fierce opposition to the treaty in Germany and maybe even a revolution. At that time, Keynes supported a more interventionist economic policy and was therefore against a deliberate austerity build up.

In the 1930s, the notion of austerity reappeared with the Great Depression and its consequences, Europe as a whole being in a situation of austerity. This crisis framework appeared again after the Second World War, plunging several European countries into a state of misery, which can be qualified as austerity. At this moment, it was clear that the continent needed to rebuild its devastated lands and cities.

This state of austerity gradually faded away during "The Glorious Thirty" but resurfaced quickly in the 1980s with the general awareness of ecological limits and key resource depletion which suggested the rethinking of the socio-economic system. Then, with the subprime crisis in 2007–2008, the notion of austerity came back strongly and explicitly especially in the economic and urban realm. Indeed, the changing economic conditions led to the emergence of the concept of austerity urbanism. In austerity urbanism, cities have to take care of themselves since “municipal governments act as cost-saving business actors that envisage running cities like corporations”. Even if the situation is not uniform across cities, nor completely comparable, the manifestation of austerity became “evident at the urban scale”.

Nowadays, there are several ideological undercurrents involved in the austerity narrative. On the one hand, the “economy of means” current suggests that one must stop living beyond one's means. In order to reduce the negative consequences of austerity urbanism, such as the rise of youth unemployment as well as poverty, social exclusion and the increasing debt prevailing in most Western economies for example, it is considered necessary to be cautious regarding public expenses. However, this can result in mistrust in the institutions and this increasing dissatisfaction leads to the weakening of the aforesaid institutions. On the other hand, when austerity reaches its limits, it can also open up new opportunities and therefore generate great possibilities in the urbanistic field, such as citizen-led initiatives taking place in unusual spaces or forms, in an attempt from the population to counteract the crisis situation and austerity measures.

To sum up, there is therefore a crisis-linked austerity situation in opposition to an ideological vision of prudence, which tends to maintain a pressure for unnecessary cost-avoidance. Between these two perspectives, it may be quite difficult to carry out urban planning assignments, as it necessarily implies investments at a time when funds are seemingly lacking. This is the global context in which the notion of austerity urbanism emerged, whose definition was proposed in 2012 by various authors, including Fran Tonkiss and Jamie Peck. The notion of austerity in urban planning is evolving, not being always a negative assertion, but also valuing the opportunities and innovative solutions that are created within the practice of urban planning. The notion of austerity urbanism is in fact more and more linked to that of tactical urbanism and improvisational urbanism, emphasizing in particular the growing importance of citizen solidarity. These connotations complement what has to be considered, altogether, as a progressive vision of urbanism where the game is to take advantage of a crisis to allow for new collective achievements to emerge.

== Practical interventions under conditions of austerity ==
Planning under austerity can lead to alternative and critical spatial practices, that are described by Kevin Lynch as a strategy for “dealing with the existing city [in] the search for underused space and time, and its readaptation for a desired activity. We can explore the use of streets as play areas, or the possibilities for using roof tops, empty stores, abandoned buildings, waste lots, odd bits of land, or the large areas presently sterilized by such mono-cultures as parking lots, expressways, railroad yards, and airports”.

These makeshift, informal and often temporary urban interventions were categorized by Fran Tonkiss in four protocols for planning under austerity, depending on the degree of facilitation by existing policies:

1. The “Positive model” provides the best conditions for the development of such self-organized interventions as it integrates their informal nature into formal processes, by offering building permits for instance.
2. The “Permissive model” neither facilitates, nor excludes unconventional planning strategies, being based on a tolerant approach regarding them.
3. The “Proscription model” on the other hand leaves almost no space for negotiation and improvisation initiatives by criminalizing or implementing punitive measures against them.
4. The “Abandonment model” positions these interventions as an urbanism of last resort, in response to the complete roll back of the state in terms of territorial governance.

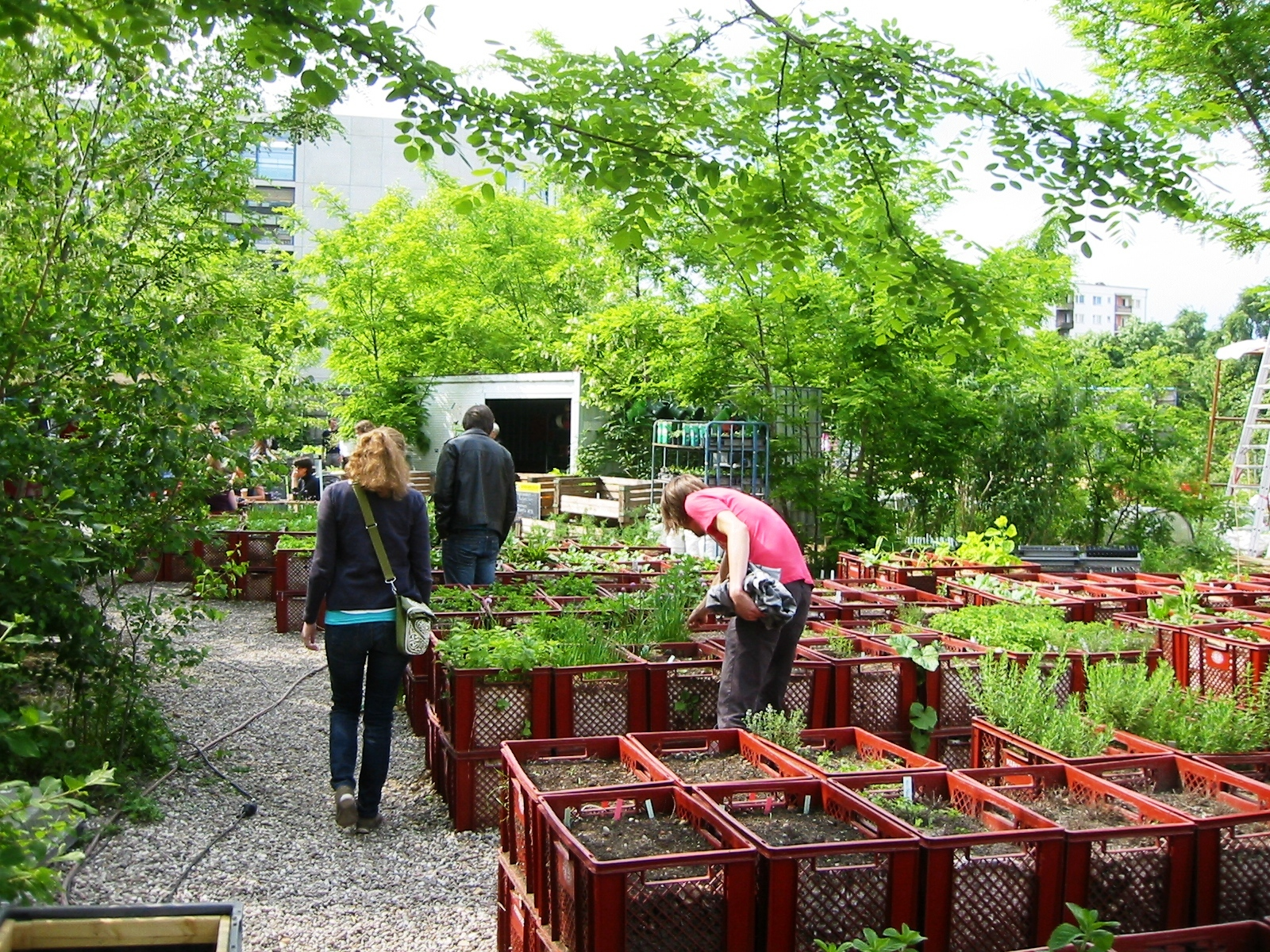
Prinzessinnengärten, Berlin Kreuzberg

In reality, these four approaches are often combined, as the case of squatting in some British cities that is a mix of the third and the fourth model. Indeed, in 2012, residential squatting was criminalized in England, and at the same time, budget cutback made it difficult to positively promote alternative practices, despite the ambitions of the Big Society political ideology. This situation was paradoxical considering that at that time the number of empty houses in the country well exceeded the number of squatters in the UK.

On a more micro-scale level, interstitial urbanism such as community gardening is another form of alternative urban interventions, open to improvisation and adaptation. Such initiatives can take place on brownfields, waste ground like the Prinzessinnengärten in Berlin or even in-between two buildings, as it is the case with the self-managed space on the rue Saint-Blaise 56 in Paris. In a context of austerity, these sites represent an important testing ground for urban experimentation as well as providing local services and spaces to counteract the lack of public policy.

=== The case of Todmorden, England ===
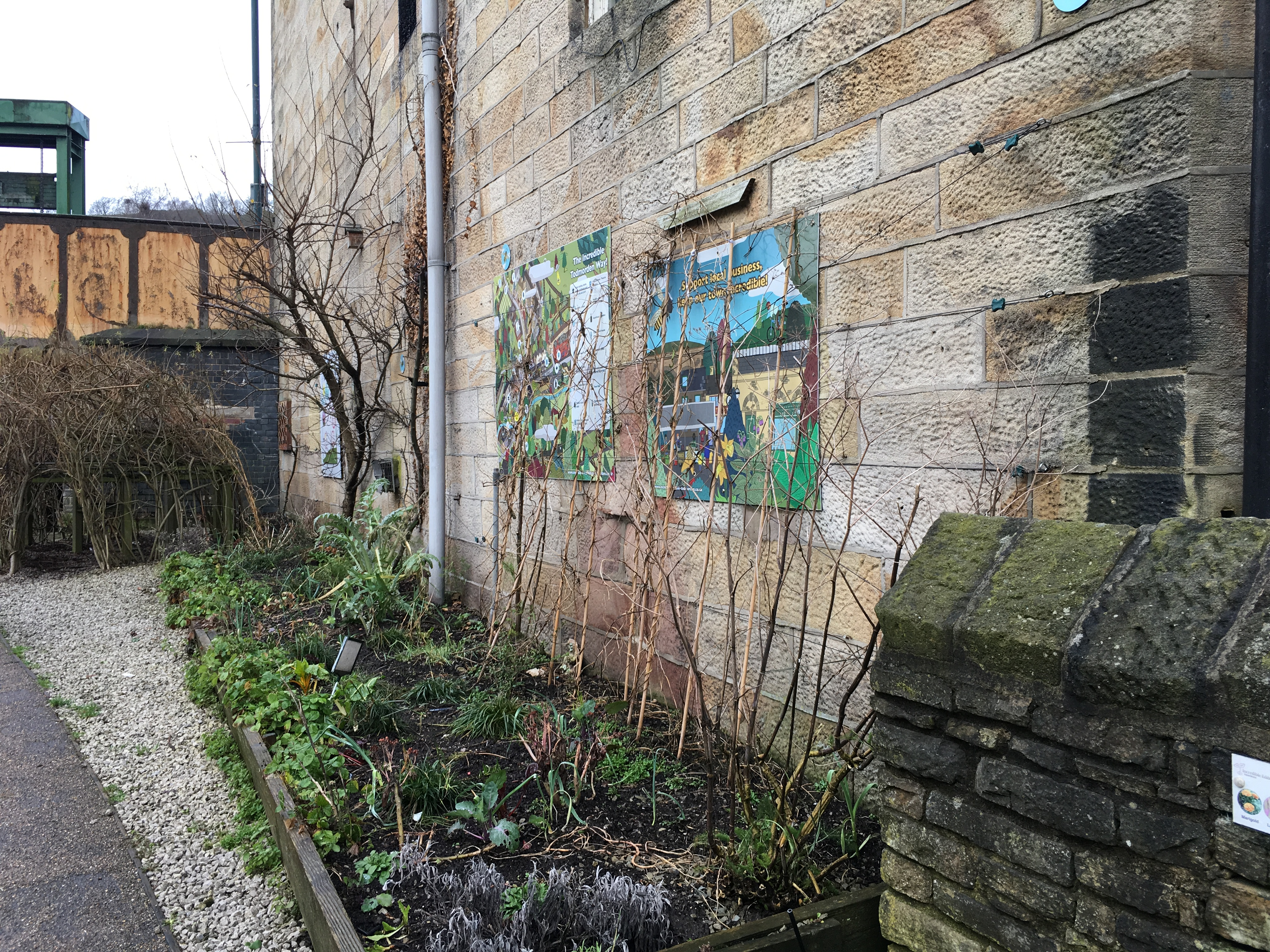
Urban vegetable gardens along the Rochdale canal, Todmorden

Todmorden is a northern English town that engaged in austerity urbanism following the deindustrialization. Between the 1970s and 2010, the city lost about half of its population, mostly being workers that became unemployed. In response to the crisis, citizens had the idea of producing food in public spaces, cultivating vegetables in urban gardens located in every unused space around the city like next to the train station, the main road or even the police station. Todmorden is in fact the first city in the world to have launched, in 2008, a food self-sufficiency initiative, called the Incredible Edible. Nowadays, the project is still successfully going and contributes to strengthening social bonds and solidarity among the population.

== Criticism ==
Temporary urbanism can involve risks. Indeed, temporary and self-organized projects could also be used to keep unused lands attractive while the economy is in crisis and therefore facilitating the state withdrawal from its responsibilities. As Margit Mayer pointed out, “principles such as self-management, self-realization and all kinds of unconventional or insurgent creativity (…) have lost the radical edge they used to entail in the context of the overbearing Keynesian welfare state - in today’s neoliberal urbanism they have been usurped as essential ingredients of sub-local regeneration programs”.

The concept itself of austerity urbanism is the subject of different critical points of views. From a free-market perspective, austerity is a necessary, if temporary, measure to assure the financial health of the public sector where it has been spending too much and faces a large amount of debt and deficit. This perspective relates to the orthodox neoclassical economic theory which argues, against a Keynesian ideology, that public investments are bad for the economy in a long term. For the free-market advocates, austerity is a way to purge non-efficient institutions and enterprises and let new technologies and strategies emerge in a Schumpeterian "creative destruction" perspective. Translated to urban planning theories, austerity means that it is beneficial for the economy to cut public investments in urban development and let private initiatives and the private sector run cities. Entrepreneurial urbanism argues that the public sector should function more like the private sector and seek to make returns on investment on public spending and be competitive to decrease the distortions of public intervention in the market.

On the other hand, heterodox economy, radical geography, other fields of research, and left wing or Marxists political parties see austerity as a punitive and non-justified policy related to a pejorative perception of neoliberalism. Increasing inequalities, gaps in the rights to the city, and social injustice, austerity urbanism leads to what David Harvey describes as “accumulation by dispossession”. In this point of view, austerity should be stopped and new social strategies of urban development should be organized to fight the commodification and financialization of cities.
