= QJL =

QJL may refer to:

- Quantized Johnson–Lindenstrauss
- qjl, the ISO 639-3 language code for Bailang
- Qualified Junior Leader
