= Activities of the Air Training Corps =

Within the framework of the training programme Air Training Corps cadets have the opportunity of taking part in many activities. On most Squadrons the only compulsory activities in the ATC year are attendance at various church parades, usually ATC Sunday (to celebrate the founding of the Air Training Corps on 5 February 1941, see below) and Remembrance Sunday. Many wings also insist that attending Wing Parade is compulsory.

== Parade nights ==
Squadrons usually meet or parade during the evening, twice a week. Parade nights always begin and end with a parade. First parade is usually used as an opportunity for uniform inspection and to instruct cadets on the evening's activities, while final parade is usually used as an opportunity to inform cadets of upcoming events that they may wish (or may be required) to take part in. On some squadrons subscriptions, or 'subs,' are paid on a per-parade night basis. On other squadrons, subs are paid monthly either in person or by automated standing order. Subs vary from squadron to squadron and are set by the civilian committee in consultation with the squadron's Officer Commanding and other staff. Each night's activities, between first and final parade, are normally structured into two sessions with a break in between. The activities are normally pre-planned and may include lessons, drill, aviation-type activities such as aero-modelling, radio communications and map reading. Some squadrons will include physical training. Some nights are used for fieldcraft training or exercises – sometimes colloquially referred to as 'greens nights'.

== Flying ==
=== Air Experience ===
Cadets from both the Air Training Corps and CCF(RAF) are offered opportunities to fly in light aircraft, gliders and other RAF and civil aircraft. Cadets can take part in regular flights in the Grob Tutor at one of 12 Air Experience Flights (AEFs) around the UK. These flights typically last 30 minutes; as part of a structured syllabus of training it is usual for the cadet to be offered the chance of flying the aircraft or of experiencing aerobatics. The staff are all qualified service pilots, usually serving or retired RAF officers. Prior to the introduction of the Tutor, AEFs were equipped with Bulldogs as a temporary measure following the retirement of the Chipmunk in 1996. The Chipmunk was introduced in 1957 and during its service flew many thousands of cadets. Prior to the Chipmunk and established AEFs, cadet flying was a more ad hoc affair, although during the 1940s and 1950s, Airspeed Oxfords and Avro Ansons were used specifically to fly cadets. Cadets were most often used to manually pump the landing gear up or down when flying in the Ansons. Some Cadets who stand out from the rest may also get the opportunity to fly on a civil airliner or go on an overseas flight in an RAF Tri-Star, VC10 or Hercules. A few cadets have also had the opportunity to fly in a variety of other aircraft including fast jets and the Red Arrows. In general, every cadet will be given opportunities to fly during their time as an active member of an ATC or CCF squadron.

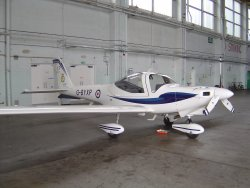
One of the Grob Tutor T1 aircraft used by Air Experience Flights.

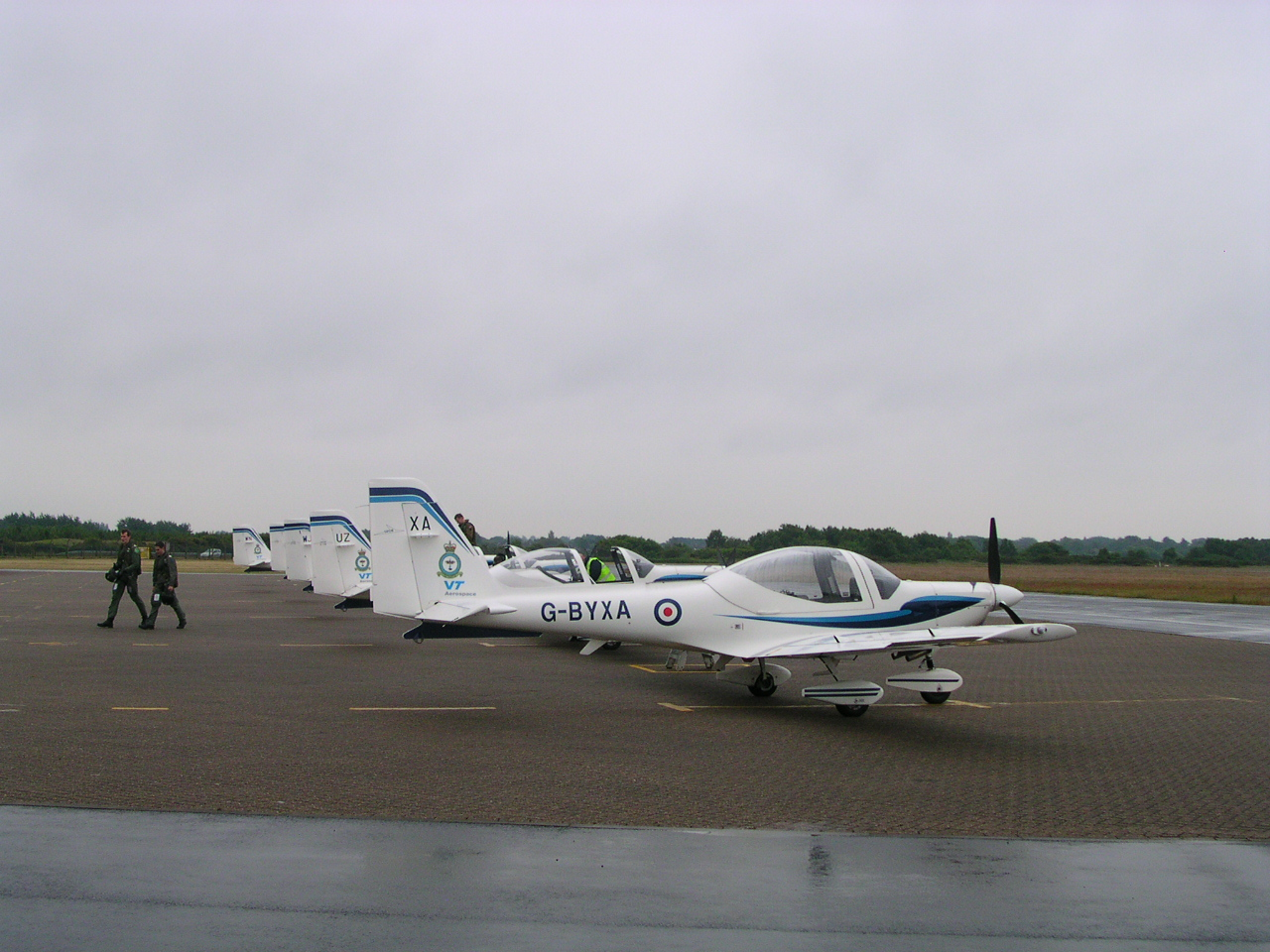
Grob Tutors at RAF Woodvale

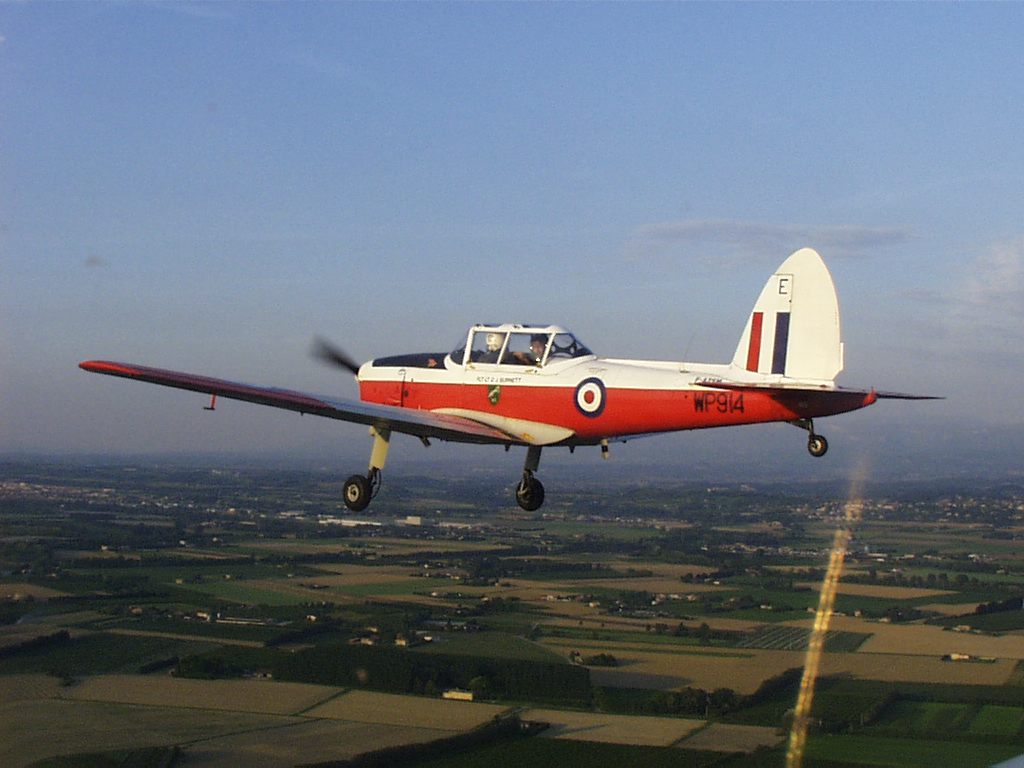
Chipmunk T.10 previously used by AEFs until 1996.

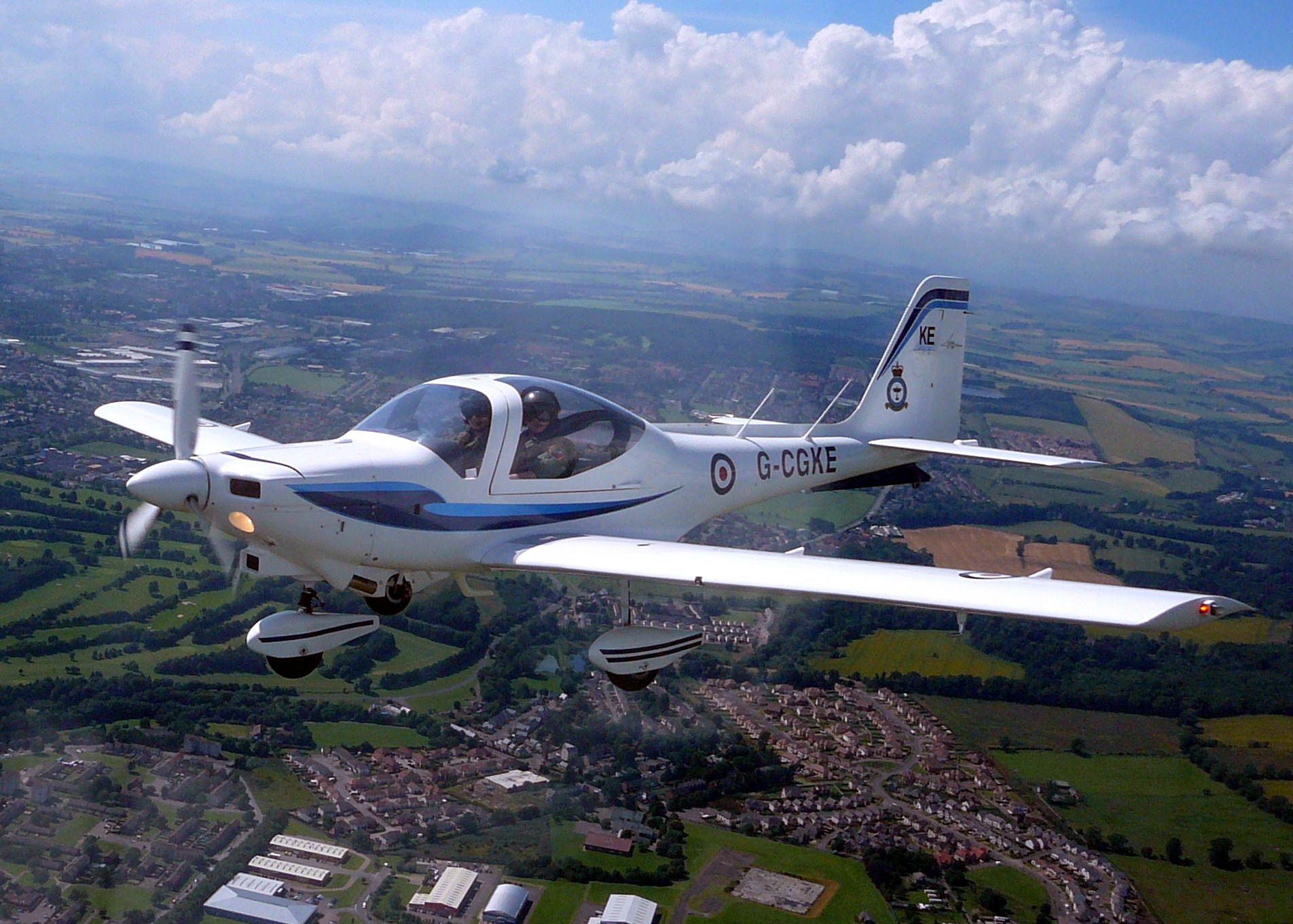
Grob Tutor in flight

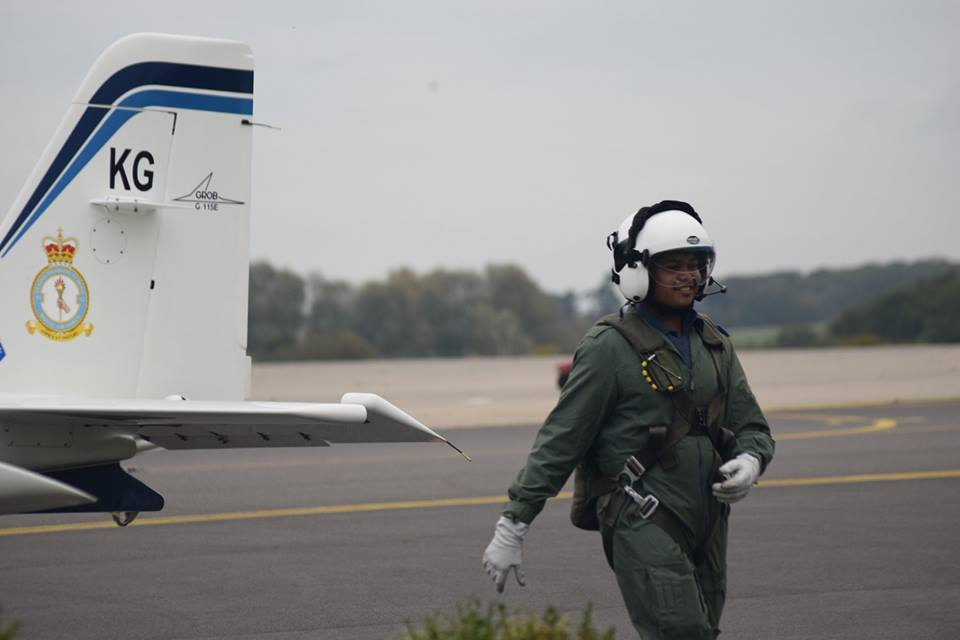
Tail of the Grob Tutor T1 'Kilo-Golf' aircraft as used by members of the Air Training Corps. ATC cadets would normally wear a flying suit, a helmet, and a parachute; in some cases, a life jacket is also required.

=== Gliding ===
Cadets can also undertake elementary flying training at a Volunteer Gliding Squadron (VGS) in Air Cadet gliders. The staff are all qualified service gliding instructors, usually made up of a mixture of regulars, reservists and Civilian Instructors.

At age 16 onwards, cadets can apply for gliding scholarships through their squadron staff. If selected, the cadet will receive up to 40 instructional launches on the Viking conventional glider (although if the student is close to solo standard it is not unusual for this limit to be exceeded). Cadets who successfully complete either of these programmes will be awarded blue wings. Cadets who show the required aptitude and ability may go on to perform a solo flight and be awarded silver wings. Further training is available to a select few cadets who show potential to progress onto Advanced Gliding Training (AGT) where on completion they are awarded gold wings. Usually these cadets will be enrolled as Flight Staff Cadets (FSCs) and further training to instructor categories is possible.

A FSC can achieve a Grade 2 award, which recognises them as a competent solo pilot, a Grade 1 award, allowing them to carry passengers in the air and perform the basic teaching tasks involved in the GIC courses, a C category instructors rating which is a probationary instructor who is qualified to teach the Gliding Scholarship course, and possibly a B category instructors rating which allows them to perform the duties of a 'B cat' explained below, with the exception that they cannot perform the role of duty instructor (DI) who is in control of the day's flying and decisions for the time that they are in that role.

Once a cadet reaches 20 years of age, he can no longer be a FSC and must become a Civilian (Gliding) Instructor, CGI, (although a FSC has this option at age 18) or a commissioned officer. Once either of these adult statuses has been gained, 'B cat' and 'A cat' is possible. B cats can carry out AGT flying training. An A cat is able to send first solos, whereas a B cat can only send subsequent solos. Both can perform SCT (Staff Continuation Training) to keep other members of staff well trained and current in their flying categories.

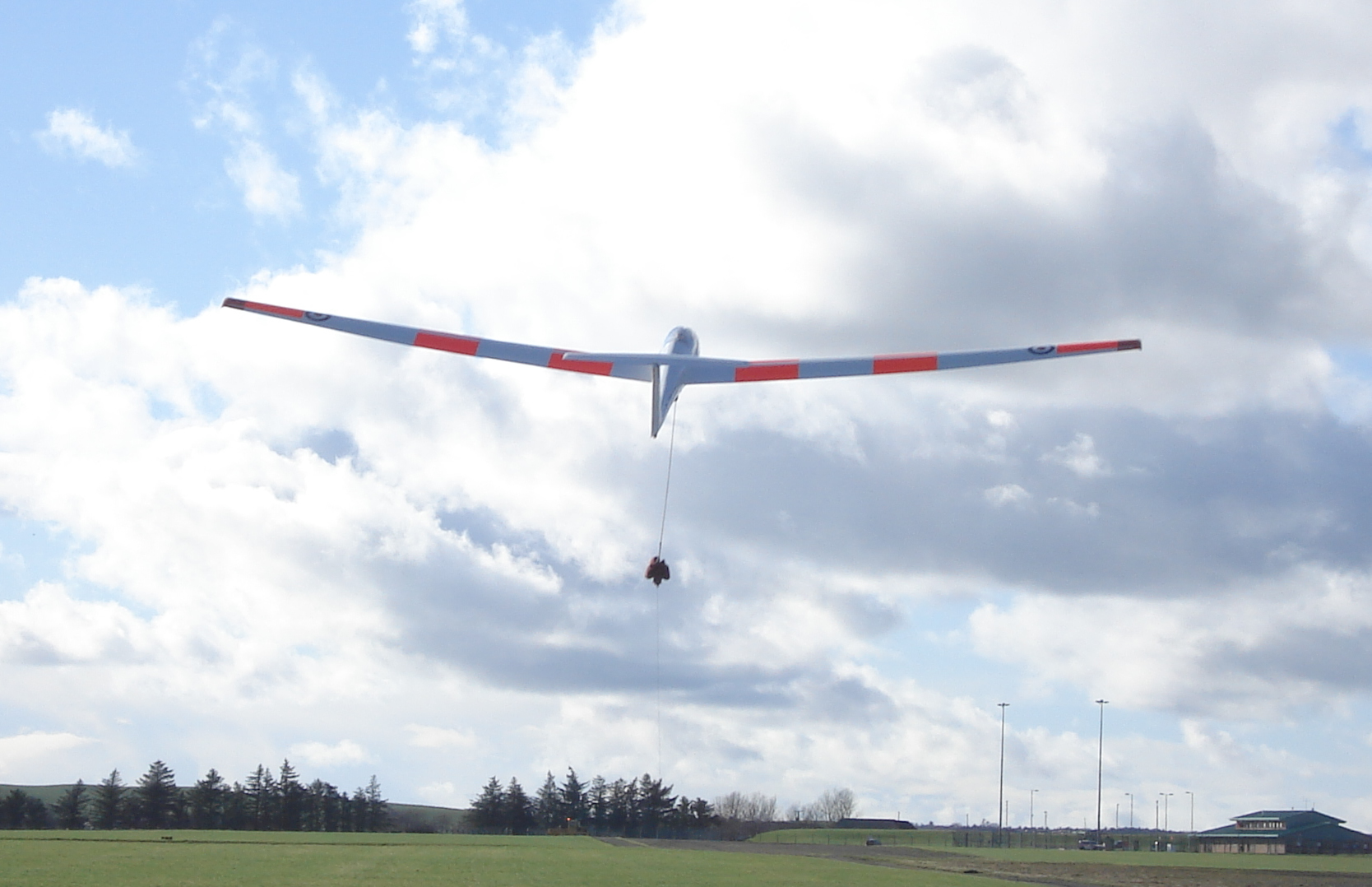
One of the Grob Viking TX1 gliders used by the Volunteer Gliding Squadrons.

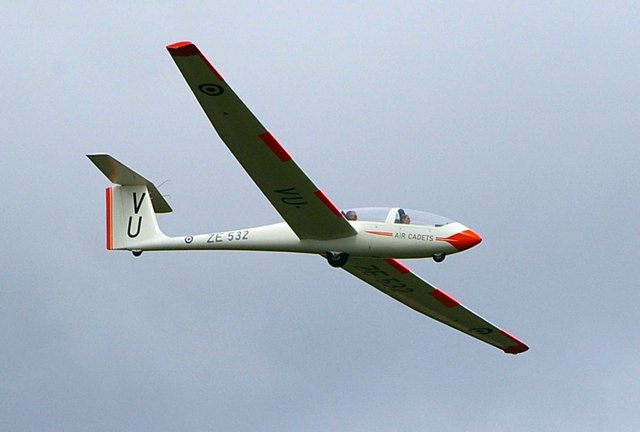
Viking TX1 glider

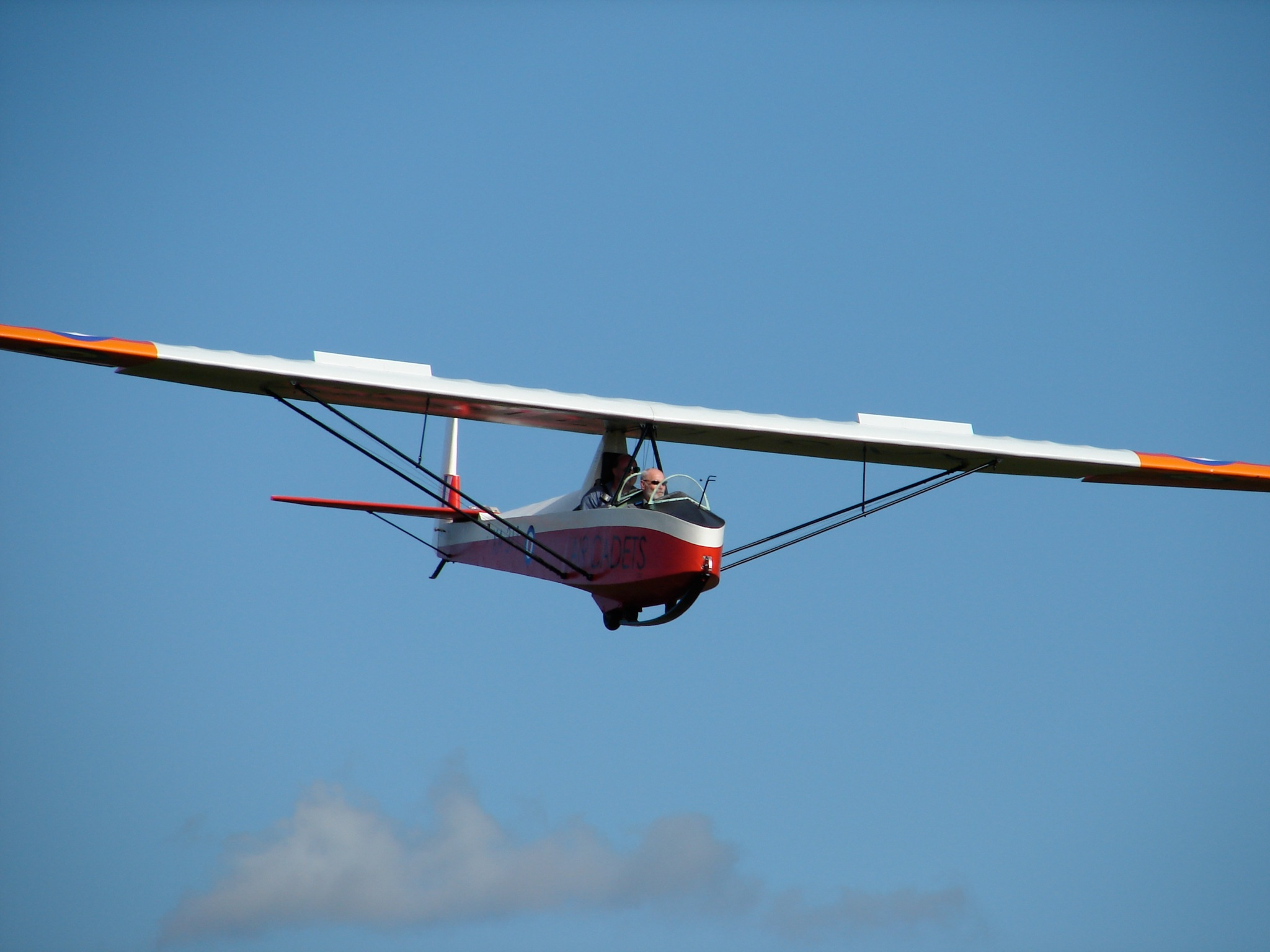
Slingsby Cadet TX.3 glider used by the ATC from 1953 to 1986

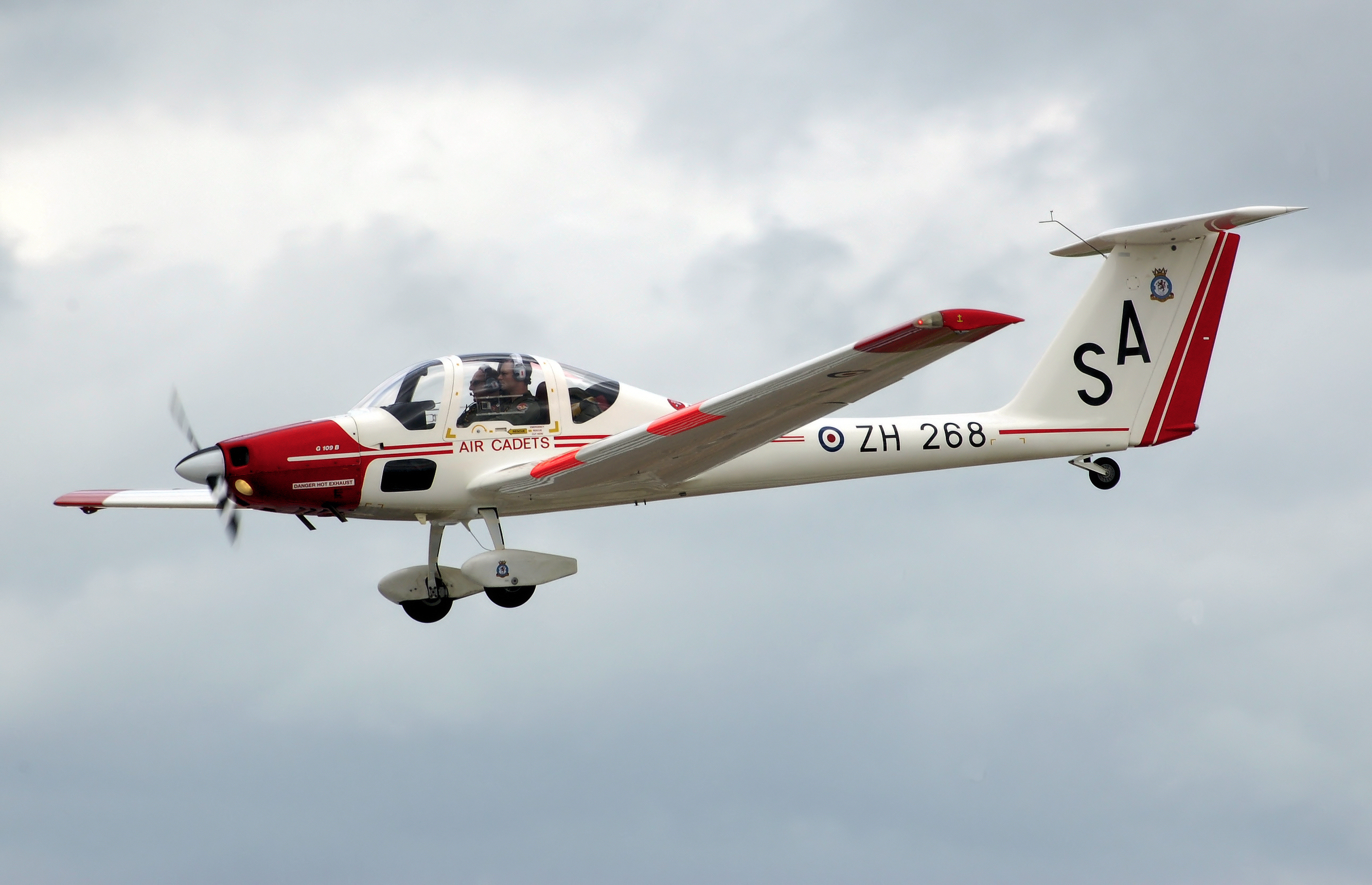
Grob Vigilant T1 motor-glider, previously used by the RAF Air Cadets.

== Marksmanship ==
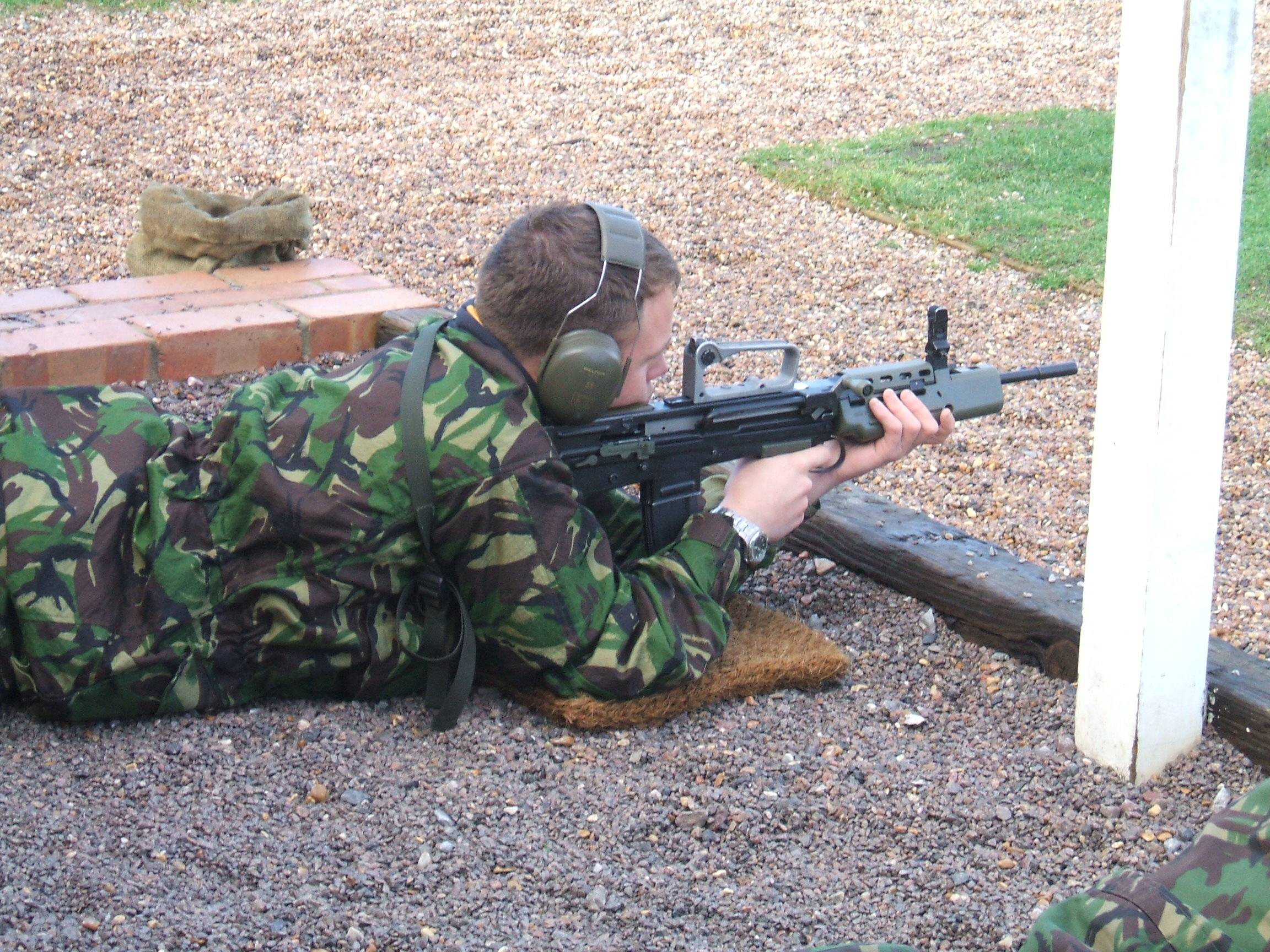
A Sea Cadet Corps Petty Officer Cadet firing the L98A1 Cadet GP rifle

Cadets at all levels of the Air Training Corps have the opportunity to participate in the sport of rifle shooting. Since the ATC was originally a recruiting organisation for the Royal Air Force it made good sense for marksmanship to be on the training syllabus. Shooting remains one of the most popular cadet activities. Cadets have the opportunity of firing a variety of rifles on firing ranges. Cadets first train with and fire either the L144A1 Cadet Small Bore Target Rifle (CSBTR) .22 rifle or .177 air rifles. They can then progress to the L98A2GP (GP standing for Cadet General Purpose), a variant of the 5.56 mm L85A2, with the selector switch removed and locked on repetition. The 7.62 mm Parker Hale L81A2 Cadet Target Rifle is also used at long ranges for competition shooting such as ISCRM. Although safety has always been the main concern when shooting, with everything done by the book, recent years have seen the introduction of a wider range of training courses for staff involved in shooting to improve quality and safety even further. There are many competitions, from postal smallbore competitions to the yearly Cadet-Inter-Service-Skill-at-Arms meet (CISSAM or commonly pronounced "siss-amm")and the annual Inter-Service-Cadet-Rifle-Meet (ISCRM or commonly pronounced "iss-crum") at Bisley, the home of UK shooting. There are currently four types of marksman award that a cadet can achieve, ranging from "Trained Shot", through "Marksman" and "Advanced Marksman", up to "Competition Marksman". To achieve these awards the cadet needs to undergo a special shooting "marksman" practice and then achieve a high enough qualifying score depending on the award specified. The top 100 cadets in the ISCRM competition are awarded the prestigious "Cadet 100" marksman award, and the top 50 cadets in the CISSAM competition are awarded the equally prestigious the "Cadet 50" award.

== Drill ==
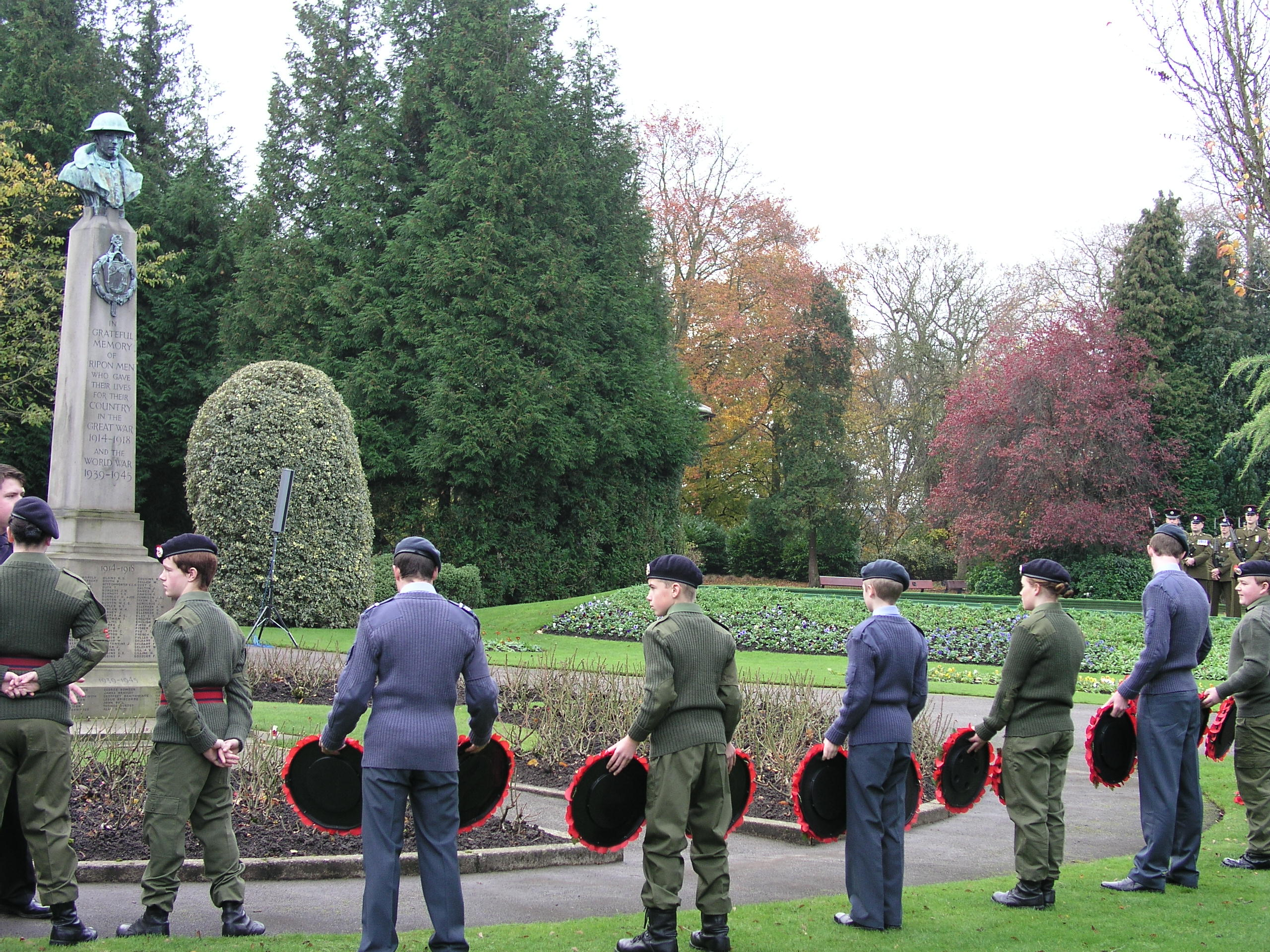
ATC and ACF cadets at a Remembrance Sunday parade.

The Air Cadets, as a uniformed youth organization, sets itself and its members very high standards, including dress and behaviour. Drill is a vital part of encouraging teamwork. All ATC squadrons practice drill as a means of instilling discipline and teamwork and a means for Officers and NCOs to develop the ability to command and control. It is also used in formal parades and for moving around military bases and moving cadets in a smart, uniform manner. There are also drill competitions: inter-Squadron, inter-Wing, and inter-Region Exhibition drill competitions. Air Cadet drill is taken from the RAF Drill Manual (AP818). All drill instruction should be solely conducted by a qualified Drill Instructor (DI). However, as not all units have access to a DI other WOs, SNCO (ATC) will assume this responsibility. More often than not, cadet NCOs will instruct drill within their squadron and drill competition squads must consist of only cadets, led by a cadet drill co-ordinator.

Cadets participate in various forms of drill, some of which include:

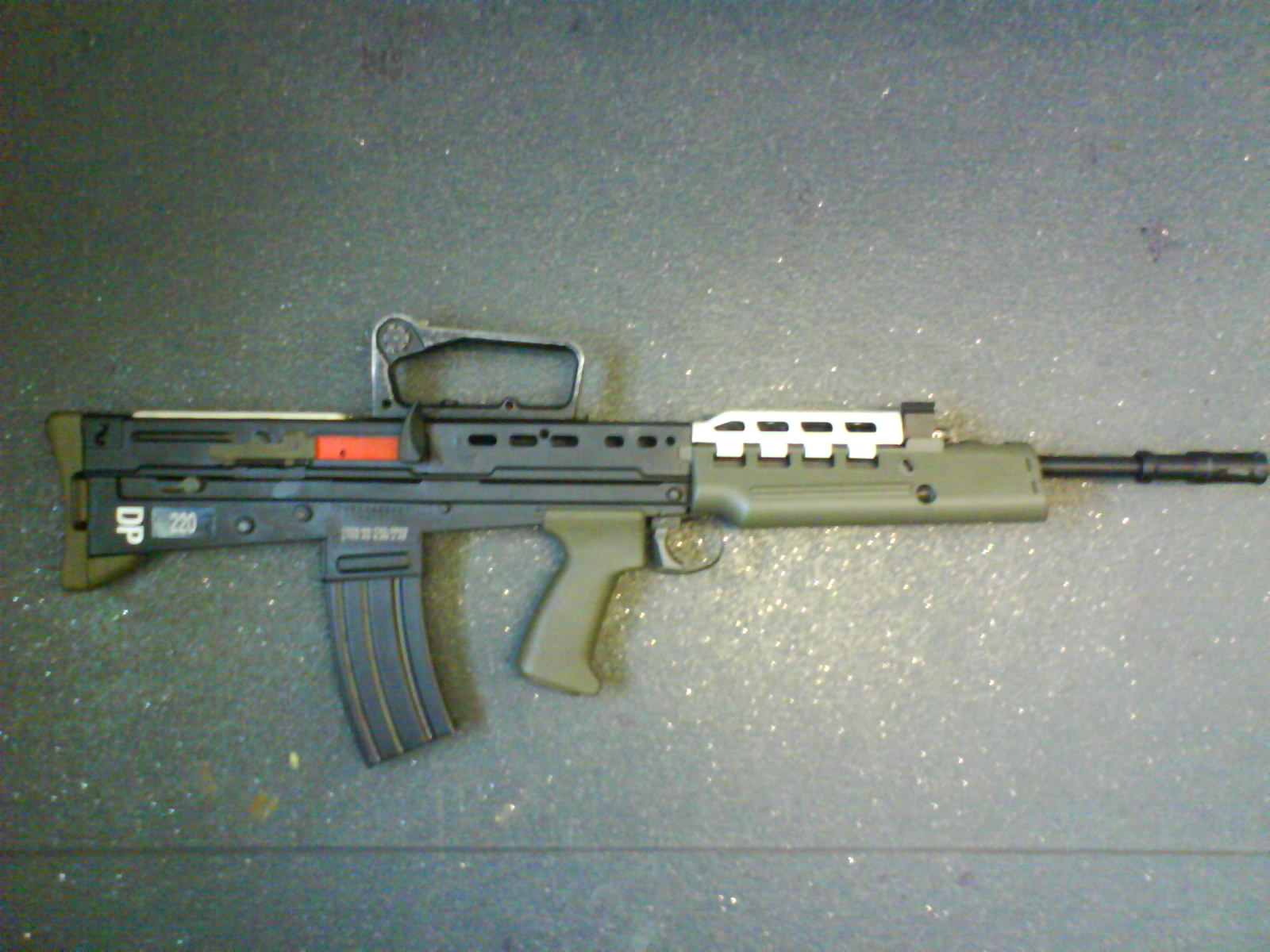
The L103A2 - a drill purpose version of the L98A2 - used by cadets for practising rifle drill and weapons handling tests.

- Static Drill
- Basic Drill - Quick & Slow Time
- Banner Drill
- Ceremonial Parades
- Band Drill
- Rifle Drill

Drill & discipline is the responsibility of the WOs and/or NCOs on a squadron. Once a cadet has gained a few years of experience and has attained NCO rank, the cadet will pass on knowledge and experience to other cadets, such as instructing cadets how to participate in a drill squad, taking charge of a drill squad or flight or even taking a major part in ceremonial drill such as a Standard Bearer at Remembrance Day Parades. Some Wings run Drill courses in order to improve NCO drill.

== Adventure Training ==
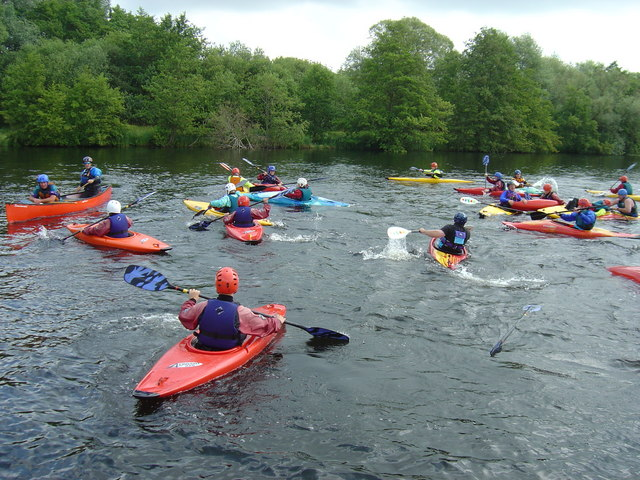
Kayaking at Buckenham Tofts Lake on the Stanford Training Area (STANTA)

Adventure Training is defined as:

"Challenging outdoor training for Personnel in specified adventurous activities, involving controlled exposure to risk, to develop leadership, teamwork, physical fitness, moral and physical courage, among other personal attributes and skills vital to operational capability."

It is an important part of ATC activities and can help develop teamwork as well as leadership skills.

Within the ATC there are many opportunities to take part in adventure training, such as hillwalking, canoeing, kayaking, camouflage and concealment expeditions, hiking, and camping. All activities of this kind are supervised by appropriately qualified staff (Mountain Leader for Hill walking, British Canoe Union (BCU) instructors for canoeing and kayaking). There are also nationally run courses such as Parachuting, Basic Winter Training and Nordic Skiing to name a few. Adventure training can take place as part of regular squadron parade nights, weekend and week-long centres. There are also two national ATC adventure training camps. NACATC (National Air Cadet Adventure Training Centre) Llanbedr in Snowdonia and NACATC Windermere in the English Lake District. Here cadets stay for a week participating in various activities in adventure training. There is a wide-ranging Adventure Training syllabus in the ACO – although specifics depend upon the squadron.

=== Camps ===
ATC activities which include annual camps, in the UK and overseas, are intended to help develop teamwork as well as leadership skills.

One large annual camp is the Royal International Air Tattoo (RIAT) camp held annually in July for the major airshow at RAF Fairford. Each year, cadets aged above 16 years and their staff spend between one and three weeks, carrying out essential work in the preparation, and the subsequent taking-down of the infrastructure for RIAT.

=== Climbing ===
Climbing is a physical challenge for the cadet, and also helps develop concentration and judgement as well as Teamwork. Many squadrons go on climbing trips regularly – a few even have their own climbing walls. All climbing is supervised by professionally qualified instructors (either internal or external staff members).

=== Fieldcraft ===
Fieldcraft is an exciting part of any squadron's training programme, and the promise of a good exercise is always guaranteed to get good attendance. Fieldcraft is, to put it simply, the art of living and moving in the field. Although the ACO is generally focused on different activities, fieldcraft does play a part in most squadrons' training programmes.

Fieldcraft is taught from a single manual, common to all squadrons, so the basic lessons are very similar across the ATC; however, 'Consolidated Practical Training' (CPT) and full exercises differ greatly depending on local resources, staffing and skill levels. Exercises and CPT place emphasis on different aspects of fieldcraft – some might need you and your team to move slowly and quietly while approaching an 'enemy' installation, others require speed as well as stealth, and a quick decision on how much of the one to trade off against the other.

As of 2019, the ATC has introduced blank-firing and pyrotechnics into its fieldcraft syllabus; an activity that was previously reserved for advanced level courses such as the Junior Leaders course.

A generally acknowledged advantage of fieldcraft exercises is that it forces cadets to use their initiative. A relatively junior member of the squadron could find themselves in a decision-making position. For this reason, fieldcraft is often used by squadrons as a method of assessing cadets' leadership qualities, as it forces cadets to make quick decisions and perhaps to effectively lead a team, even when they're unsure of exactly what's going on or what they're supposed to be doing. For this reason, fieldcraft forms the core of the ATC's Junior Leaders course.

== Leadership training ==
Leadership training is an important part of many squadrons' training programmes, with training available at higher levels too. Most wings run NCO courses (also run on a regional basis), designed to help newly promoted NCOs to perform their duties well, or to train those eligible for promotion, these are normally two days in length.

The Air Cadet Leadership Course is run by the Combined Cadet Force (RAF) at RAF Cranwell. Successful completion of this leads to the award of the Cadet Leadership badge.

In the Air cadets, there are four levels of leadership, Blue, Bronze, Silver and Gold (ACLC). With each stage the leadership tasks get more difficult and more knowledge is expected. Both Blue and Bronze can be taught and assessed on the squadron, and will consist of a number of lessons spread out over the syllabus. Silver is taught and assessed at wing level, having one day with multiple lessons. Gold is taught and assessed on Corps (national) level, Gold leadership or the Air Cadet Leadership Course (ACLC) is a 10-day course, that comprises taught lessons, practical lessons and demonstrations, multiple high level Command tasks/practical leadership exercises (PTEs) Physical exercises intended to tire you and strain you (to see how you lead when your tired, worn out and under stress) two nights camping and assessments. ACLC is taught at RAFC Cranwell by leadership experts.

=== Junior Leaders ===
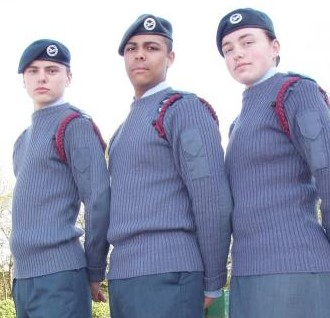
Qualified Junior Leaders wearing the maroon JL lanyard.

Junior Leaders course crest

Cadets over the age of 17 and of the rank of at least Cadet Corporal can complete a leadership course called Junior Leaders, abbreviated simply to, 'JL'. This course requires over a hundred hours of planning and a high degree of physical fitness. Upon completion, the cadet is awarded a maroon lanyard (which replaces the yellow Instructor Cadet lanyard on the cadet's uniform) and a green and wedgwood blue DZ Flash for wearing on the DPM or MTP uniform as well as qualifying for the ILM level 3 diploma in Team Leading.

The course culminates in the award of a Level 3 Certificate in Leadership & Management from the Institute of Leadership and Management. Some JL's once completing the course, come back to the following year's Course as a Qualified Junior Leader, (QJL).

The course is also open to Sea Cadets and Army Cadets.

==== Structure ====
Junior leaders flash

This course is run in three phases and split into 8 separate training weekends and a 10-day test phase.

Phase one covers the core skills of management, life skills, armed forces knowledge, L85 weapon handling, interview skills, social skills, public speaking, project management, elementary infantry tactics, Fitness, and teamwork. At the end of Phase One, they are tested on their knowledge on air power which they will have to study for before hand. They will also have to complete a presentation on a pre-chosen topic and pass an L85 weapons handling test, and remain physically fit throughout the whole course.

Phase two is where cadets develop their tactics and leadership development (TLD). During this phase Cadets have to be able to use their skills in real life fieldcraft scenarios and receive coaching by members of the Regular and Reserve Forces. The emphasis is on leadership under high pressure, within the context of combat scenarios. By the end of Phase Two, they must have also submitted the workbook for the ILM Level 3 diploma.

Phase three consists of 10 days at a graduation camp (eight days completing a field exercise, followed by a day of R&R and then a day of awards with a graduation dinner). All participants have to have a twelve-hour period to lead a section. It is during these days that the skills and knowledge gained by the cadet over the previous months is put to the test.

Finally by the end of Phase Three, they must have raised at least £250 for the John Thornton Young Achievers Foundation (JTYAF).

== Duke of Edinburgh's Award ==
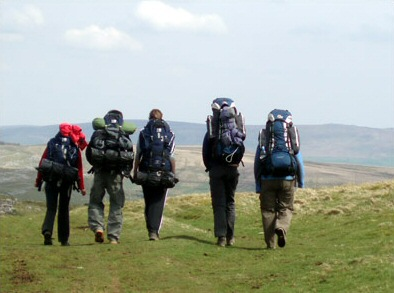
Setting off on the Expedition phase of the DoE Award

The Air Training Corps is the single largest operating authority of the Duke of Edinburgh's Award system and celebrated its 50th year of providing this opportunity to its cadets in 2006. The Duke of Edinburgh's Award Scheme is a voluntary, non-competitive programme of practical, cultural and adventurous activities for young people aged 14–25. The Award programme consists of three levels, Bronze, Silver and Gold. Each has differing criteria for entry and the level of achievement necessary to complete each award. Air Cadets who meet the age criteria can join the award scheme.

Cadets are often encouraged to achieve the Bronze, Silver and Gold awards as they progress through their cadet careers. Some cadets aged 16 or over were formerly able to participate in the Duke of Edinburgh's Millennium Volunteers Award. As of 2012, this has been taken over by another authority and whether cadets will be able to undertake it is under review.

The Award is widely recognised by employers as it helps demonstrate that award holders are keen to take on new challenges, have a higher level of self-confidence than many of their peers, leadership qualities and the experience of teamwork.

== Sport ==
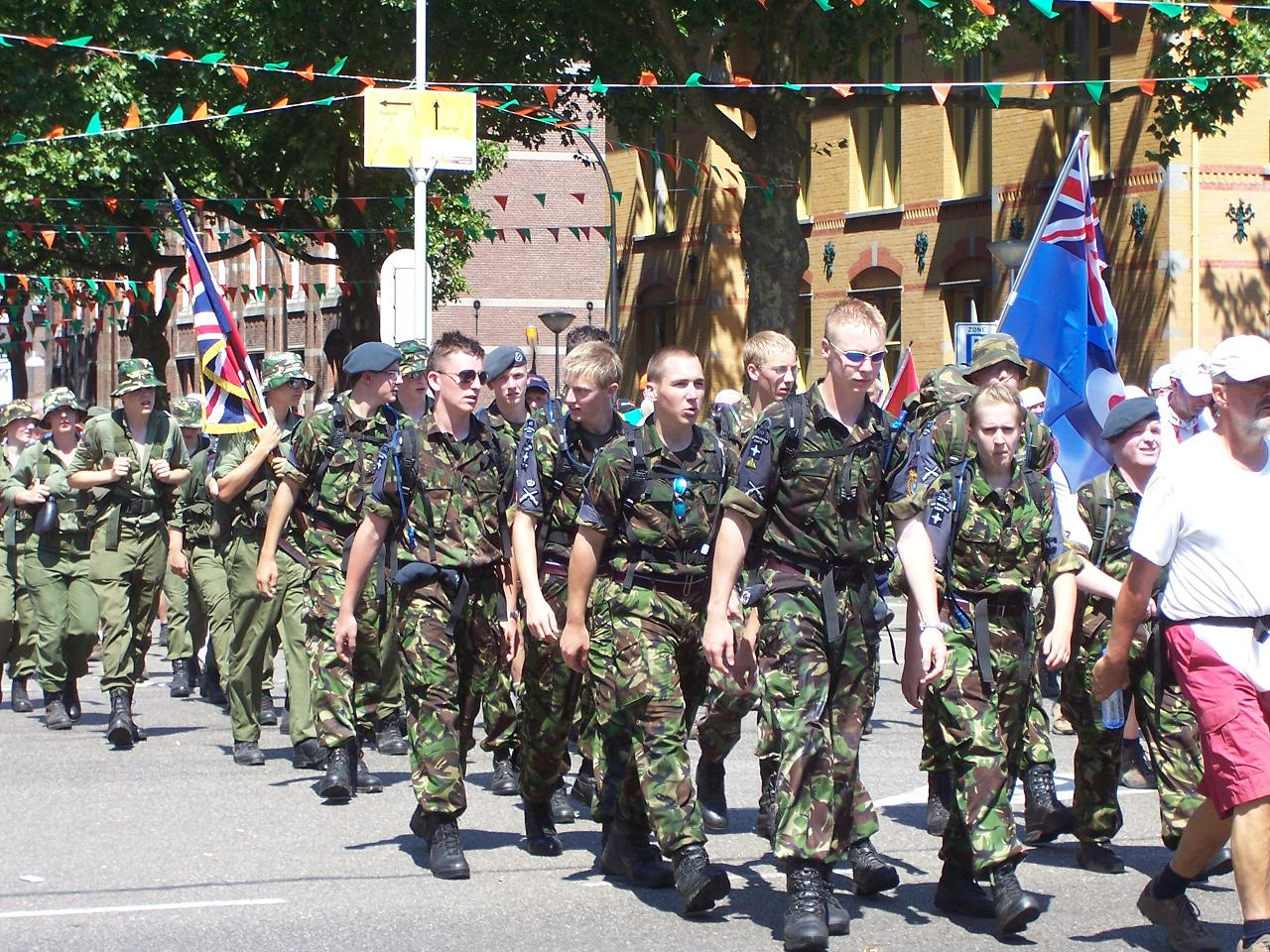
A Nijmegen road marching team from South & East Midlands Wing, Air Training Corps from 2006.

Sport plays a key part in the activities of every squadron. Seven sports are played competitively between squadrons. Cadets who show talent can be selected to represent their Wing, Region or the Corps in competitive matches; these cadets are awarded wing, regional or corps 'Blues'. The main sports played are:

- Rugby Union
- Hockey
- Netball
- Association football
- Swimming
- Athletics
- Cross-country running
- Orienteering

Other sports are also played, sometimes in matches between squadrons, including volleyball, five-a-side football, table tennis, etc. Cadets also use various sports to take part in the physical recreation section of the Duke of Edinburgh's Award. Orienteering in the ATC only came about in 2006 where cadets from the different wings go to the cadet orienteering championships.

Various units send two teams to the annual Nijmegen Vierdaagse Marches where on successful completion of the event they are awarded a medal.

== Qualified Aerospace Instructor's Course (QAIC) ==
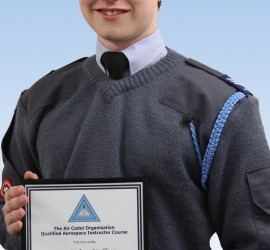
A Qualified Aerospace Instructor Cadet wearing the blue QAI lanyard.

The Qualified Aerospace Instructors Course (QAIC) has been available since September 2008. The course is held at RAF Linton-on-Ouse, and as of 2011, also at MOD Boscombe Down (as of RAF Linton-on-Ouse's closure in December 2020, the North centre was moved to Inskip Cadet Centre as of QAIC 14). The course is held from early September to Easter of the following year, beginning with a selection weekend in early September, and seven total weekends (as of QAIC 8, prior to this there were only six training weekends) from late September until early March. QAIC aims to "deliver an aerospace course to senior cadets of the ACO that combines academic and synthetic training in aerospace based subjects combined with personal development training". The course is split into QAIC North, at RNAS Inskip (HMS Nightjar) and QAIC South at MoD Boscombe Down.

The course culminates in a 'Graduation Week' which is organised to coincide with the Easter holidays to avoid clashing with school programmes. After completing training in various modules, they carry out examinations in all modules (air traffic control, air power, flight simulators, aerodynamics, and Instructional Teaching and Presentation Skills (ITPS)); satisfactory performance in all exams results in the cadet being awarded the pale blue QAIC lanyard and flight suit badge. Upon completion of the course, graduating students are offered affiliated membership to the Royal Aeronautical Society.

Cadets who pass the course are known as Qualified Aerospace Instructors (QAIs), and wear a light blue lanyard over their left shoulder.

== Communications ==
An extensive range of communication training is offered where appropriately skilled instructors and equipment are available. This can range from hand-held radio operating procedures to long-distance HF radio and networked digital communication, and even encompasses publishing online.

The Basic 'blue' Radio Certificate is the first step, followed by the Full Radio Operator 'bronze' Certificate. These qualifications have been part of the curriculum since 2000. Cadets are then encouraged to pursue this training further across a range of mediums and technologies. Once a sufficiently broad spectrum of skills have been mastered and validated by the Wing Radio Communications Officer the cadet is awarded the Air Cadet Communicator Certificate and the Communicator Badge, which is worn on the brassard. Communication training provides valuable practical lessons in information handling and management, develops interpersonal skills and meets one of the Corps' prime objectives: 'providing training useful in both civilian and military life'.

== Cyber Security ==
An extensive curriculum of Cyber Security Courses is available to Cadets. In joint award with the Blue Radio Operator, 'blue' Cyber Security is also awarded.

The Cyber Security Courses can range from basic Anti-Virus protection to large scale hacking programmes. Most Cyber Courses take place on the Squadron HQ however the more advanced courses take place at the No.2 Radio School situated in RAF Cosford.

== Community volunteering ==
Cadets often volunteer to help at various national and local events. For their services, a small payment is usually offered to their squadron's funds. Typical examples of such work include car parking duties at events and delivering copies of Gateway Magazine to RAF married quarters.

The largest example of cadets involved in volunteer work is at the Royal International Air Tattoo, an annual air display held at RAF Fairford. Each year several hundred air cadets volunteer to stay on the base in temporary accommodation. During the course of the event they help with duties such as selling programmes, crowd control and clearing litter.

== Band ==
Members of squadron bands may be entitled to wear specific band badges, subject to passing the appropriate assessment as per ACP 1812.

- A Drummer's badge is a blue, bronze, silver or gold drum, displayed in the middle of the brassard.
- A Piper's badge depicts a blue, bronze, silver or gold set of pipes, again displayed in the middle of the brassard.
- A Buglers badge depicts two blue, bronze, silver or gold crossed trumpets, displayed in the middle of the brassard.
- A Bandsman's badge, is a blue, bronze, silver or gold bell lyre, displayed in the middle of the brassard. It is given to any other bandsmember that doesn't play drums, bagpipes or bugle.

The Pipe Major's badge, composed of four inverted chevrons surmounted by a bagpipes is not permitted to be worn at any level. However, the standard Royal Air Force Blue Drum Major rank slides, consisting of four inverted chevrons surmounted by a drum, may be worn by Drum Major's when acting as such.

=== Music camps ===
There are also specific music camps, which is where a cadet of musical proficiency applies to attend, and they are selected depending on the musical skill (grades) and their other qualities. About 35 - 40 cadets are selected for this each year. The annual national Air Cadet music camp is held at RAF College Cranwell, HQ of the ATC. Upon attending this camp, cadets are rewarded by receiving a gold-coloured band badge, to replace the silver-coloured badges worn by ATC band members.

The National Concert Band of the Air Cadets, composed of attendees of the National camp, have recently performed at some very prestigious events. These include The Royal International Air Tattoo (RIAT), held at RAF Fairford. A Garden Party at Buckingham Palace, playing the National Anthem for the arrival of Prince Charles and Camilla. The band has also performed at The Mansion House, London for the Royal Centenary Banquet of the Air League in the presence of distinguished guests such as the Lord Mayor of London, and Anne, Princess Royal.

Towards the second half of 2008, the ACO Music Services agreed to establish a corps marching band, formed of cadets from all 6 regions throughout the Air Training Corps. The first National Marching Band camp was held in October 2008 at Browndown Battery, with a performance being made in front of HMS Victory.

The Nation Marching Band of the Air Cadets, now uses Fort Blockhouse as its training ground. The band's most recent performances have been at Royal Air Force Museum London, the previous Hendon Aerodrome. On 13 July 2010, the 72 cadets forming the band marched down Pall Mall and into Buckingham Palace in a contingent featuring 575 other Air Cadets, celebrating the 150th Anniversary of Cadet Forces.

== First aid ==
=== Essential First Aid ===
The St John Ambulance Essential First Aid course replaces the British Heart Foundation Heartstart Scheme as the blue-level first aid qualification as part of the PTS, and is usually delivered at squadron-level.

=== Youth First Aid ===
The St John Ambulance Youth First Aid course is the bronze-level PTS first aid course, and may be provided at squadron-, wing- or region-level. The course can be completed over a weekend, or over a series of parade nights. Either way, the course is assessed by a practical exam, where cadets have to deal with three situations: a conscious, breathing casualty; an unconscious, breathing casualty; and an unconscious non-breathing casualty, involving CPR on a Resusci Anne mannequin.

A series of first aid topics are covered during the course such as fainting, bleeding, head injuries and bites and stings. These are taught by qualified staff, often qualified to the level of First Aid at Work. Upon completion, cadets receive a red Youth First Aid badge for sewing onto the brassard as well as a certificate.

=== Activity First Aid ===
Some cadets have the opportunity to undertake the St John Ambulance Activity First Aid Course, a much more detailed course for more senior cadets over the age of sixteen. Completion of the Activity First Aid Course trains cadets to the level of first aid required for many adult 'outdoor' qualifications such as the Mountain Leader Award.

=== Instructor First Aid ===
The St John Ambulance Instructor First Aid course is available to staff cadets, and is the gold-level PTS first aid course.

== Corps-wide trophies ==
Air Training Corps squadrons each have a chance annually to win the two most prized trophies in the corps. The Sir Alan Lees trophy is awarded by the commandant Air Training Corps to the squadron with the best statistics and overall impression when inspected. The Morris Trophy is awarded to one of the six regional candidates upon inspection by the commandant.

Sir Alan Lees Trophy
year	winning ATC squadron	ATC wing	Officer Commanding
1952	No. 187 (Worcestershire) Squadron	West Mercian Wing	Sqn Ldr Charles Baynton-Hughes MBE RAFVR(T)
1971	No. 187 (City of Worcester) Squadron	West Mercian Wing	Sqn Ldr Charles Baynton-Hughes MBE RAFVR(T)
1976	176 (Hove) Squadron	Sussex Wing	Flt Lt F P Le Duc MBE RAFVR(T)
1979	93 (City of Bath) Squadron	Somerset Wing	Sqn Ldr Brian T Higgins RAFVR(T)
1980	1084 (Market Harborough) Squadron	South Midlands Wing	Flt Lt Donald Edge RAFVR(T)
1981	2427 (Biggin Hill) Squadron	Kent Wing	
1982	93 (City of Bath) Squadron	Somerset Wing	Sqn Ldr Brian T Higgins MBE RAFVR(T)
1983	93 (City of Bath) Squadron	Somerset Wing	Sqn Ldr Brian T Higgins MBE RAFVR(T)
1984	444 (Shoreditch) Squadron	London Wing	Flt Lt Ronald S Frewin MBE RAFVR(T)
1985	866 (Immingham) Squadron	Central & East Region	Flt. Lt Tony Lark MBE RAFVR(T)
1991	2375 (Neston) Squadron	Merseyside Wing	Flt. Lt H Wellings RAFVR(T)
1993	No. 424 (Southampton) Squadron	Hampshire & Isle of Wight	Sqn Ldr A Jones MBE RAFVR(T)
1994	No. 111 (Sunderland) Squadron	Durham & Northumberland Wing	Flt Lt David Harris RAFVR(T)
1995	No. 1145 (Dunfermline) Squadron	Dundee & Central Scotland Wing	Flt Lt Ross Mitchell RAFVR(T)
1996	No. 2152 (North Bristol) Squadron	Bristol & Gloucestershire Wing	Flt Lt David Cox RAFVR(T)
2000	No. 230 (Congleton) Squadron	Staffordshire Wing	Flt Lt Rod Goodier RAFVR(T)
2001	No. 215 (City of Swansea) Squadron	No.3 Welsh Wing	Sqn Ldr Phillip Flower MBE RAFVR(T)
2005	No. 215 (City of Swansea) Squadron	No.3 Welsh Wing	Sqn Ldr Phillip Flower MBE RAFVR(T)
2007	No. 1145 (Dunfermline) Squadron	Dundee & Central Scotland Wing	Flt Lt Ross Mitchell RAFVR(T)
2008	No. 241 (Wanstead and Woodford) Squadron	London Wing	Sqn Ldr Jerry Godden RAFVR(T)
2009	No. 610 (Chester) Squadron	Merseyside Wing	Flt Lt John Kendal RAFVR(T)
2010	No. 1475 (Dulwich) Squadron	London Wing	Sqn Ldr Kevin Mehmet MBE RAFVR(T)
2011	No. 215 (City of Swansea) Squadron	No. 3 Welsh Wing	Sqn Ldr Phillip Flower MBE RAFVR(T)
2012	No. 2160 (Sleaford) Squadron	Trent Wing	Flt Lt Mel Walker RAFVR(T)
2013	No. 2344 (Longbenton) Squadron	Durham & Northumberland Wing	Flt Lt Gary Richardson RAFVR(T)
2014	No. 1349 (Woking) Squadron	Surrey Wing	Flt Lt Ben White RAFVR(T)
2015	No. 56 (Woolwich) Squadron	London Wing	Flt Lt Mark Bird RAFVR(T)
2016	No. 31 (Tower Hamlets) Squadron	London Wing	Flt Lt Rex Nicholls RAFVR(T)
2017	No. 187 (City of Worcester) Squadron	West Mercian Wing	FS (ATC) Karl Nicholson
2018	No. 2480 (Holywell) Squadron	Number Two Welsh Wing	Flt Lt D Anglesea RAFAC
2019	No. 111 (Sunderland) Squadron	Durham & Northumberland Wing	Flt Lt James Yeo RAFAC
2022	No. 241 (Wanstead and Woodford) Squadron	London Wing	Sqn Ldr Jerry Godden RAFAC
2023	No. 230 (Congleton) Squadron	Greater Manchester Wing	Flt Lt Kate Clarke RAFAC
2024	No. 308 (City of Colchester) Squadron	Essex Wing	Sqn Ldr Elly Shipley RAFAC

The Morris Trophy
year	winning ATC squadron	ATC wing	Officer Commanding
1978	176 (Hove) Squadron	Sussex Wing	Flt Lt F P Le Duc MBE RAFVR(T)
1983	444 (Shoreditch) Squadron	London Wing	Flt Lt Ronald S Frewin MBE RAFVR(T)
1997	No. 2465 (Icknield) Squadron	Beds and Cambs Wing	Flt Lt P R Smith RAFVR(T)
2006	No. 2409(Halton) Squadron	Herts and Bucks Wing	Sqn Ldr Jerry Davies RAFVR(T)
2008	No. 1855 (Royton) Squadron	East Lancashire Wing	Flt Lt Mark Hamilton RAFVR(T)
2009	No. 1211 (Swadlincote) Squadron	South and East Midlands Wing	Flt Lt Alyn Thompson RAFVR(T)
2010	No. 126 (City of Derby) Squadron	South and East Midlands Wing	Sqn Ldr Ian Marshall RAFVR(T)
2011	No. 1855 (Royton) Squadron	East Lancashire Wing	Flt Lt Mark Hamilton RAFVR(T)
2012	No. 633 (West Swindon) Squadron	Dorset & Wiltshire Wing	Flt Lt Helene Woodham RAFVR(T)
2013	No. 2516 (Droitwich) Squadron	West Mercian Wing	Flt Lt Paul Wilde RAFVR(T)
2014	No. 184 (Manchester South) Squadron	Greater Manchester Wing	Flt Lt Tom Warner RAFVR(T)
2015	No. 1271 (Bathgate) Squadron	West Scotland Wing	Flt Lt Margaret Greer RAFVR(T)
2016	No. 126 (City of Derby) Squadron	South and East Midlands Wing	Sqn Ldr Ian Marshall MBE RAFVR(T)
2017	No. 1211 (Swadlincote) Squadron	South and East Midlands Wing	Flt Lt Ruth Morgan RAFVR(T)
2018	No. 7 Overseas (Jersey) Squadron	Dorset and Wiltshire Wing	Flt Lt Victoria Atherton MBE RAFAC
2022	No. 2344 (Longbenton) Squadron	Durham & Northumberland Wing	Flt Lt Gary Richardson RAFAC
2023	No. 261 (Guildford) Squadron	Surrey Wing	Flt Lt Andy Brittain RAFAC
2024	No. 2175 (Rolls Royce) Squadron	West Scotland Wing	Flt Lt Stuart McLellan MBE RAFAC

The Foster Trophy is awarded to the cadet who has achieved the highest academic results in the entire corps over their time in the Air Training Corps, after finishing the cadet syllabus that leads to a BTEC Level 2 Certificate in Aviation Studies. In addition, there are also trophies presented annually by the Royal Air Forces Association (RAFA). These trophies include the 'Sir Douglas Bader Wings Appeal Trophy' for the ATC squadron collecting the most money on a per capita basis, the squadron achieving second place is awarded the 'Sir Augustus Walker Trophy'. The 'Sir Robert Saundby Trophy' is awarded for collecting the highest net Wings Appeal amount.

The Quinton Memorial Trophy is a national award presented annually to the adult non-commissioned officer (NCO) who has gained the top academic results in the senior non-commissioned officer (SNCO) initial courses held at the Air Cadet Adult Training Facility, Royal Air Force College Cranwell (RAFC). This trophy is named in honour of Flight Lieutenant John Quinton. (Note: Flight Lieutenant John Alan Quinton was an RAF navigator on a Wellington aircraft, which was flying an air cadet on an Air Experience Flight in 1951. During the flight, the aircraft was involved in a mid-air collision, and Flight Lieutenant Quinton gave the only parachute within reach to the cadet, pushing him out of the aircraft. His quick thinking and heroic action saved the life of the cadet but cost him his own, for which he was posthumously awarded the George Cross.)

== Academic qualifications ==
Cadets can also qualify for various other BTEC awards through the training that is carried out at their squadrons. There are many additional courses and awards that can be gained. The recognised qualifications are:

- BTEC Level 2 Diploma in Aviation Studies for Air Cadets - equivalent to 4 GCSE A-C grade (administered by Headquarters Air Cadets).
- BTEC Level 2 Extended Certificate in Aviation Studies for Air Cadets - equivalent to 2 GCSE A-C grade (administered by Headquarters Air Cadets)
- BTEC First Diploma in Public Services - equivalent to 4 GCSEs A-C grades (administered by the Cadet Vocational College).
- BTEC First Diploma in Music - equivalent to 4 GCSEs A-C grades (administered by Cadet Vocational College).
- BTEC Certificate in Aviation Studies - equivalent to 2 GCSEs A-C grades (administered by Headquarters Air Cadets)
- ILM Certificate in Team Leading - Level 2 (administered by Cadet Vocational College).
