= Millennium Volunteers =

UK youth volunteering organization

Millennium Volunteers (often abbreviated as MV) is a youth volunteering initiative in the UK, set up with public funding, and aimed at people aged between 14 and 24. The programme works to engage young people in a variety of volunteering opportunities, providing recognition through certificates and awards up to 200 hours. Originally operating across the UK, Millennium Volunteers is now only available in Northern Ireland and Wales, it was replaced in England in 2008 by vInspired and in Scotland in 2012 by the Saltire Award.

== MV across the UK ==
In England, from 1 April 2007, the Millennium Volunteers scheme was taken over by the newly established charity 'v', who assumed management of the scheme, before replacing it in England with 'vinsipred' in January 2008.

In Scotland, MV was rebranded as 'The Saltire Awards' from April 2012. The Award is run by Volunteer Development Scotland (VDS) and includes a 500 hours award, which is not available in the rest of the UK.

In Wales, MV is run by the GwirVol initiative, the Welsh programme to encourage and promote youth volunteering, and from 2012 has been open to 14- to 25-year-olds. Organisations can apply for grants from GwirVol of up to £10,000 to run Millennium Volunteers programmes.

In Northern Ireland, the Millennium Volunteers programme is run by Volunteer Now, with the support of the Department of Education and the Youth Council for Northern Ireland. The programme is delivered through a network of charity, community and voluntary groups known as delivery partners, with young people taking part receiving certificates after completing 50, 100 and 200 hours of volunteering. As well as the main programme there is also a specific stream for volunteering in sport called GoldMark, and a Schools Award for second-level students.

Although the four countries of the UK now have their own version of MV, the Awards follow roughly the same principles and hours can be interchangeable between counties of the UK in some circumstances.

Millennium Volunteers were partnered with BTCV, a national charity whose resources were used to provide an MV service in some regions.

== The nine key principles ==
- Sustained personal commitment
- Community benefit
- Voluntary involvement
- Inclusive
- Ownership by young people
- Variety of opportunities
- Partnership
- Quality of volunteering opportunities
- Recognition of achievements

== Activities ==
Millennium Volunteers (MVs) can become involved with a wide variety of different activities, some examples include:

- helping to run a local scout troop
- working in a hospital
- creating a community garden
- conservation work
- classroom assistant in a school for disabled children
- sports leaders
- helping on trips with younger students
- Taking part in a Cadet program, Air Training Corps, Army Cadet Force, Sea Cadets

The only requirement was that the activity was unpaid, it benefited the community in some way and that the organisation hosting the volunteer agreed to the 9 Key Principles.

== Rewards ==
In the original MV programme, the organisation encouraged young people to work for the good of their community by offering two rewards that could be used as proof of the hard work they have done. The first reward was given on the completion of 100 hours of community work, and an Award of Excellence upon completion of 200 hours. An award for 200+hours was also available. The 200 hours Award was signed by a member of government - for instance, in Wales the Award of Excellence is signed by the First Minister of Wales.

There have been several developments to these arrangements. Wales and Northern Ireland introduced a 50 hours award in 2008 and then a special award for sports volunteering linked to the 2012 London Olympic and Paralympic Games in 2010–11. In Northern Ireland the sports award is called GoldMark and in Wales it is MV50 Sport. Additionally, in Scotland there is a 500 hours award available.

Following the creation of 'vinspired', V withdrew the 200 hours Award in England and introduced a 25 and 50 hours award instead and made the maximum award for 100 hours of volunteering.
