= Pamela Warhurst =

British Incredible Edible cofounder (born 1950)

Pamela Warhurst CBE
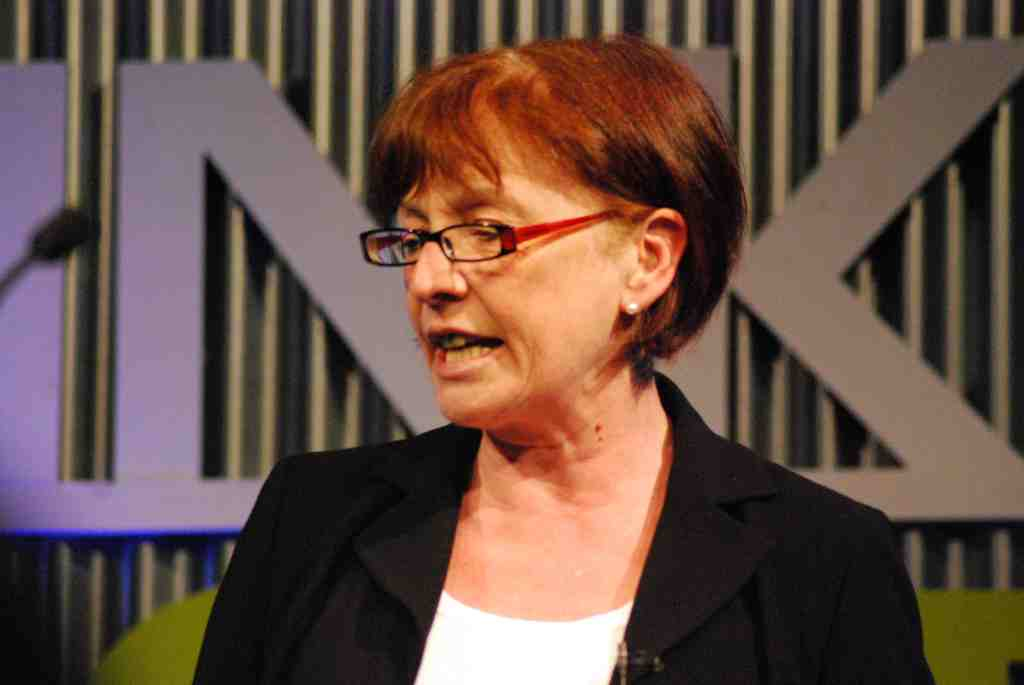
- Pam Warhurst at Thinking Digital 2012

Chair of Incredible Edible

Pamela Janice Warhurst CBE (born 1950) is a British community leader, activist and environment worker who founded the voluntary gardening initiative, Incredible Edible, in Todmorden, West Yorkshire. In 2009, Prince Charles visited the project in support.

Warhurst is currently Chair of Incredible Edible and Chair of the Todmorden Town Deal regeneration board. She was formerly Chair of Forestry Commission Great Britain, Chair of The Incredible Aquagarden (subsequently dissolved), a social enterprise demonstrating and teaching urban farming and Chair of Handmade Parade, a leading community arts enterprise. She is also a Fellow of the Royal Society of Arts & Manufacturing, and an honorary fellow of both the Landscape Institute and Leeds Beckett University. She has an MA in Economics from Manchester University.

She previously served as a member of the Board of Natural England, where she was the lead non-executive board member working on the Countryside & Rights of Way Bill in 2000. She has been both Deputy Chair and Acting Chair of the Countryside Agency, a Labour council leader on the Calderdale Council, and a board member of Yorkshire Forward. She has also chaired the National Countryside Access Forum and the Calderdale NHS Trust.

From 2005 to 2018 she took the chair of Pennine Prospects, a regeneration company focusing on the South Pennine region of the United Kingdom. In the New Year Honours 2005 Warhurst was appointed as a Commander of the Order of the British Empire (CBE), for services to the environment.

Warhurst lives in Todmorden, West Yorkshire.

In 2008, she launched Incredible Edible in Todmorden, West Yorkshire, there are currently 150 groups in the UK and 1000 groups around the world. She started an experimental project focused on "eating" in which she sowed seeds of kidney beans and other vegetables on the grounds of a dilapidated health center, a sign saying "FOOD FOR FREE" was erected when the produce was harvested. From this, the initiative opened 70 areas for the growing of food in Todmorden. The initiative operates with three primary values, described by their founder as spinning “plates”: community, business, and education. Warhurts has given lectures on the project (including TED talks) and written a book.
