= David Warhurst =

British scientist (1938–2021)

David Warhurst (1938 – 5 April 2021) was a British scientist who was professor of Protozoan Chemotherapy at the London School of Hygiene and Tropical Medicine LSHTM, where he worked on chloroquine resistance in malaria. In the late 1960s he was a Research Fellow with the Medical Research Council (MRC).
