= Community gardening =

Type of horticulture and food production

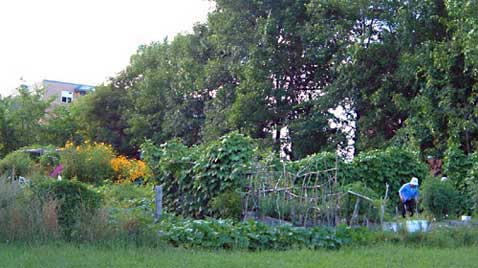
Strathcona Heights Community Garden in Ottawa, Canada

A community garden is a piece of land gardened or cultivated by a group of people individually or collectively. Normally in community gardens, the land is divided into individual plots. Each individual gardener is responsible for their own plot, and the yield or production belongs to them. In collective gardens, the piece of land is not divided. A group of people cultivates it together, and the harvest belongs to all participants. Around the world, community gardens exist in various forms; they can be located near neighborhoods or on balconies and rooftops. Their size can vary greatly from one to another. Depending on the location can determine the price of community gardens. Many community gardens also function as informal educational spaces, where volunteers teach newcomers basic gardening skills and sustainable growing practices.

Community gardens have experienced three waves of major development in North America. The earliest wave of community gardens development coincided with the Industrial Revolution and rapid urbanization process in Europe and North America; they were then called 'Jardin d'ouvrier' (or workers' garden). The second wave of community garden development happened during the WWI and WWII; they were part of "Liberty Gardens" and "Victory Gardens" respectively. The most recent wave of community garden development happened in the 1970s during the OPEC crisis, results of grassroots movement in quest for available land to combat against food insecurity.

More recently, community gardens have seen a global resurgence. This may be related to several issues faced by the global population in the 21st century, such as ecological crisis, climate change and the new sanitary crisis. Community gardens contribute to the urban agriculture movement and the requests from citizens for more community gardens has been surging in recent years. Community gardens are also accessible in over 190 + countries/regions

== Background ==
According to Marin Master Gardeners, "a community garden is any piece of land gardened by a group of people, utilizing either individual or shared plots on private or public land". Community gardens provide fresh products and plants as well as contribute to a sense of community and connection to the environment and an opportunity for satisfying labor and neighborhood improvement. They are publicly functioning in terms of ownership, access, and management, as well as typically owned in trust by local governments or not for profit associations.

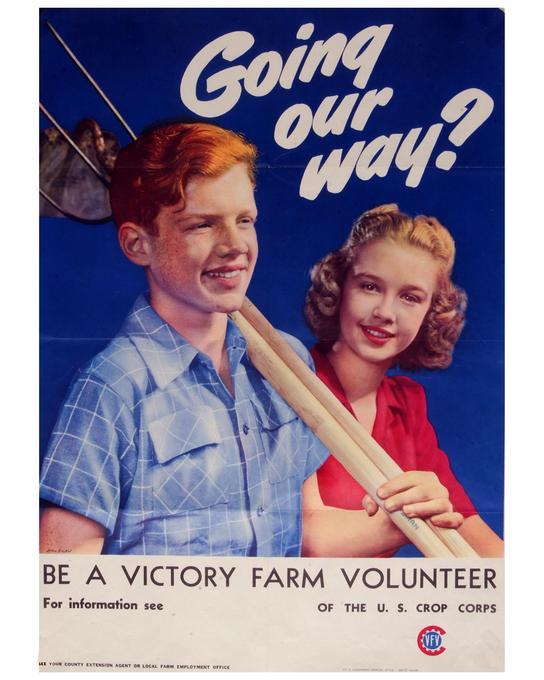
Published originally in 1945, the U.S. Crop Corps encourages people to start or volunteer in victory gardens.

Community gardens vary widely throughout the world. In North America, community gardens range from "victory garden" areas where people grow small plots of vegetables, to large "greening" projects to preserve natural areas, to large parcels where the gardeners produce much more than they can use themselves. Non-profits in many major cities offer assistance to low-income families, children's groups, and community organizations by helping them develop and grow their own gardens. In the UK and the rest of Europe, the similar "allotment gardens" can have dozens of plots, each measuring hundreds of square meters and rented by the same family for generations. In the developing world, commonly held land for small gardens is a familiar part of the landscape, even in urban areas, where they may function as market gardens.

Community gardens are often used in cities to provide fresh vegetables and fruits in "food deserts", which are urban neighborhoods where grocery stores are rare and residents may rely on processed food from convenience stores, gas stations, and fast-food restaurants.

Some writers have proposed re-framing the concept of "food deserts" as "food apartheid," emphasizing that neighborhoods lacking access to healthy food have been racially oppressed through segregation, redlining, and limited access to land. Some Black, Indigenous, and people of color have supported self-sustaining community gardens, recognizing that their liberation requires access to both land and healthy food.

Community gardens may help alleviate one effect of climate change, which is expected to cause a global decline in agricultural output, making fresh produce increasingly unaffordable. Community gardens are also an increasingly popular method of changing the built environment in order to promote health and wellness in the face of urbanization. The built environment has a wide range of positive and negative effects on the people who work, live, and play in a given area, including a person's chance of developing obesity. Community gardens encourage an urban community's food security, allowing citizens to grow their own food or for others to donate what they have grown. Advocates say locally grown food decreases a community's reliance on fossil fuels for transport of food from large agricultural areas and reduces a society's overall use of fossil fuels to drive agricultural machinery.

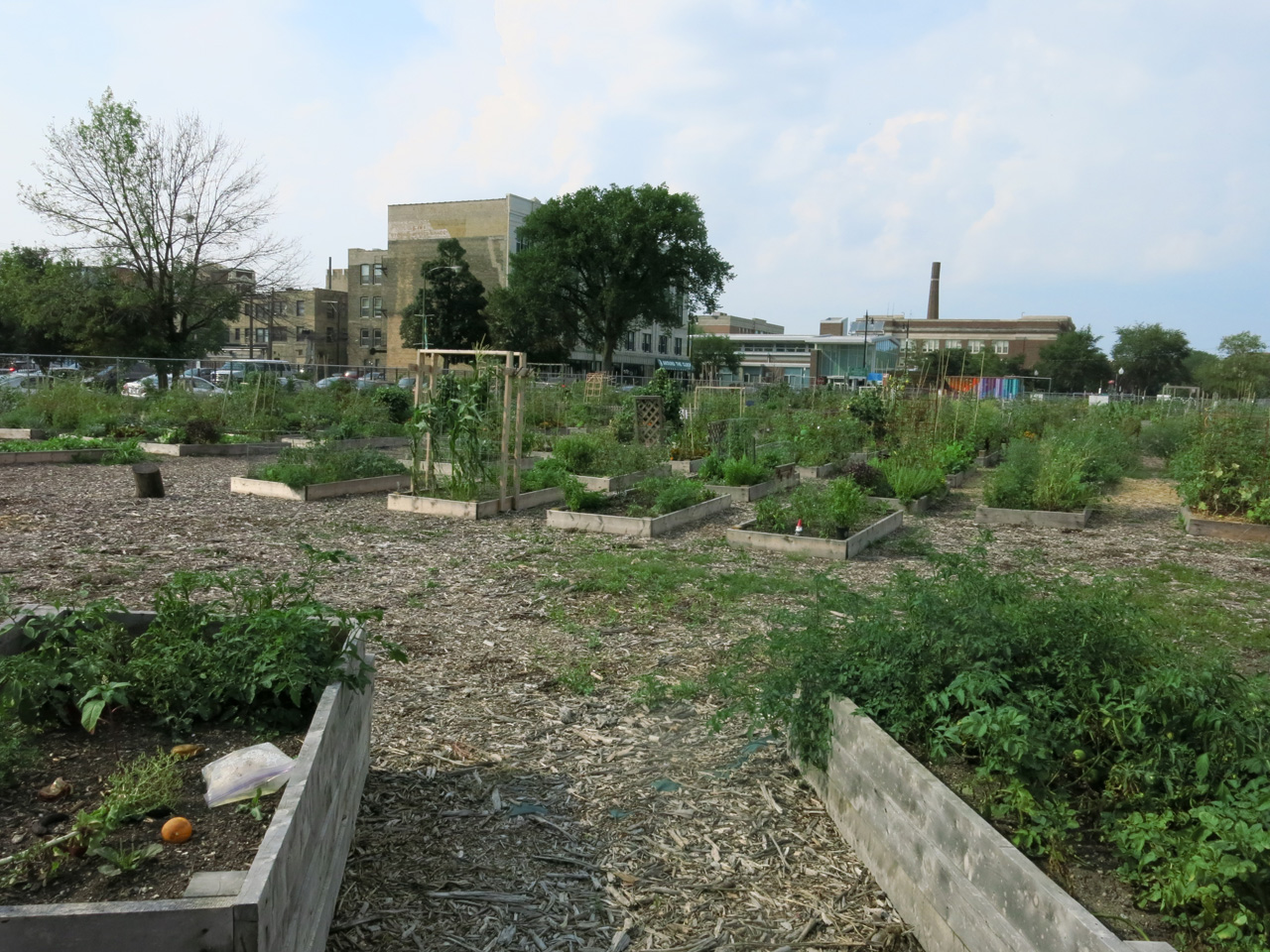
Community garden in Chicago with clearly defined plots

Community gardens improve users’ health through increased fresh vegetable consumption and providing a venue for exercise.

The gardens also combat two forms of alienation that plague modern urban life: they reconnect urban gardeners with the source of their food and reduce isolation by fostering a sense of community. Community gardens provide other social benefits, such as the sharing of food production knowledge with the wider community and safer living spaces.

=== Ownership ===
Land for a community garden can be publicly or privately held. In North America, often abandoned vacant lots are cleaned up and used as gardens. Because of their health and recreational benefits, community gardens may be included in public parks, similar to ball fields or playgrounds. Historically, community gardens have also served to provide food during wartime or periods of economic depression. Access to land and security of land tenure remains a major challenge for community gardeners worldwide, since in most cases the gardeners themselves do not own or control the land directly.

Some gardens are cultivated collectively, with everyone working together, while others are divided into individual plots, each managed by a different gardener, group, or family. Many community gardens include both common areas with shared upkeep and individual or family plots. Though communal areas are successful in some cases, in others there is a tragedy of the commons, which results in uneven workload on participants, and sometimes demoralization, neglect, and abandonment of the communal model. Some relate this to the largely unsuccessful history of collective farming.

Unlike public parks, whether a community garden is open to the general public is dependent upon the lease agreements with the management body of the park and the community garden membership. Open- or closed-gate policies vary from garden to garden. Community gardens are managed and maintained by the gardeners themselves, rather than tended only by a professional staff. A second difference is food production: Unlike parks, where plantings are ornamental (or more recently ecological), community gardens are usually focused on food production.

=== Types of gardens ===
There are multiple types of community gardens.

- Neighborhood gardens
- Residential Gardens
- Institutional Gardens
- Demonstration Gardens

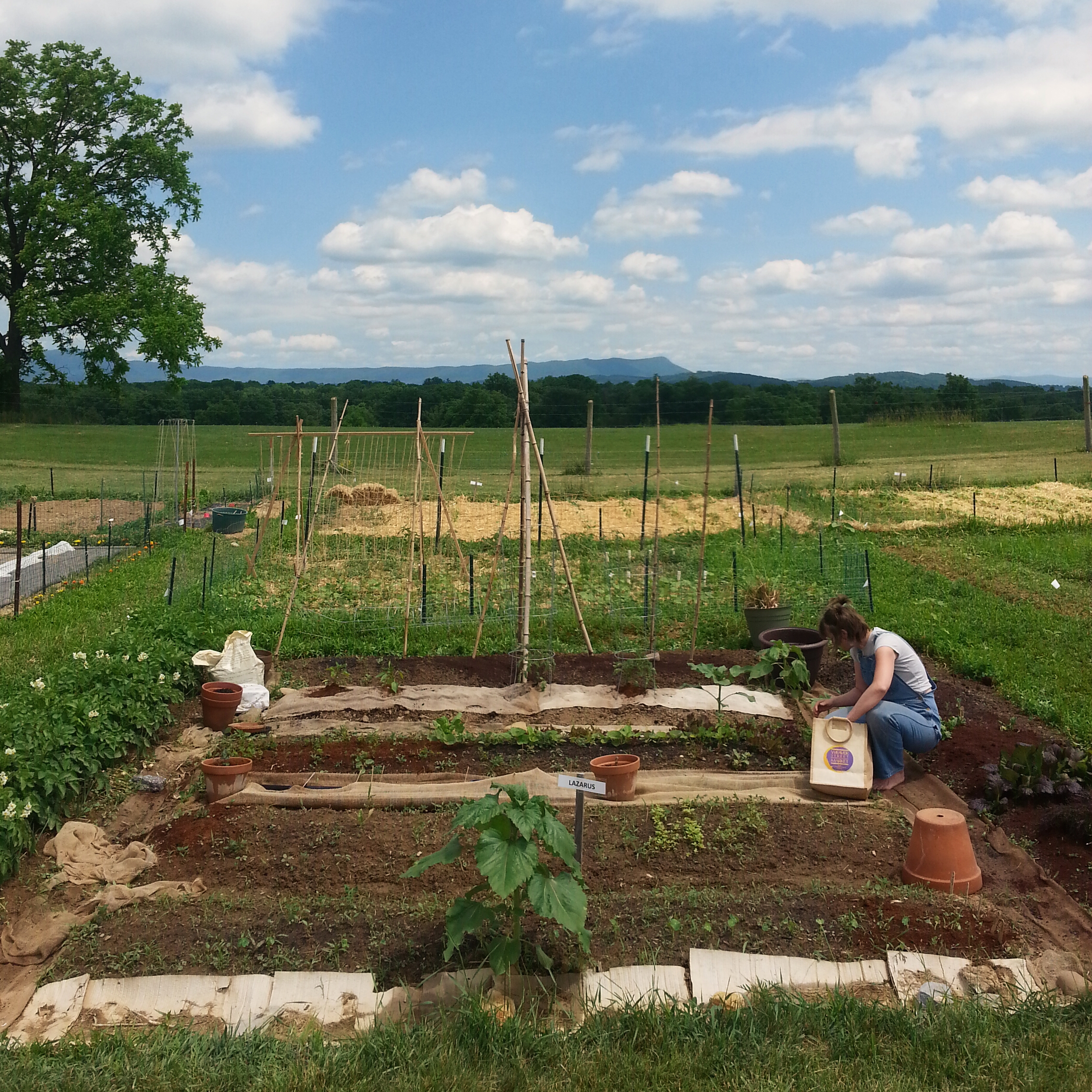
A 20ft x 20ft community garden plot in Harrisonburg, Virginia

=== Plot size ===
In Britain, the 1922 Allotment act specifies "an allotment not exceeding 40 [square] poles in extent"; since a rod, pole or perch is 5.5 yards in length, 40 square rods is 1210 square yards or 10890 square feet (equivalent to a large plot of 90 ft x 121 ft). In practice, plot sizes vary; Lewisham offers plots with an "average size" of "125 meters square". (Note: This apparently means 125m^{2} or about 1345 square feet, equivalent to a plot of about 15ft x 90ft.)

In America there is no standardized plot size. For example, plots of 3 m × 6 m (10 ft × 20 ft = 200 square feet) and 3 m x 4.5 m (10 ft x 15 ft) are listed in Alaska. Montgomery Parks in Maryland lists plots of 200, 300, 400 and 625 square feet. In Canada, plots of 20 ft x 20 ft and 10 ft x 10 ft, as well as smaller "raised beds", are listed in Vancouver.

=== Location ===
Community gardens may be found in neighborhoods and on the grounds of schools, hospitals, and residential housing. The location of a community garden is a critical factor in how often the community garden is used and who visits it. Exposure to a community garden is much more likely for an individual if they are able to walk or drive to the location, as opposed to public transportation. The length of travel time is also a factor. Those who live within a 15-minute or less travel distance is more likely to visit a community garden as compared to those with a longer travel time. Such statistics should be taken into consideration when choosing a location for a community garden for a target population.

The site location should also be considered for its soil conditions as well as sun conditions. An area with a fair amount of morning sunlight and shade in the afternoon is most ideal. While specifics vary from plant to plant, most do well with 6 to 8 full hours of sunlight.

When considering a location, areas near industrial zones may require soil testing for contaminants. If soil is safe, the composition should be loose and well-draining. However, if the soil at the location cannot be used, synthetic soil may also be used in raised gardens beds or containers.

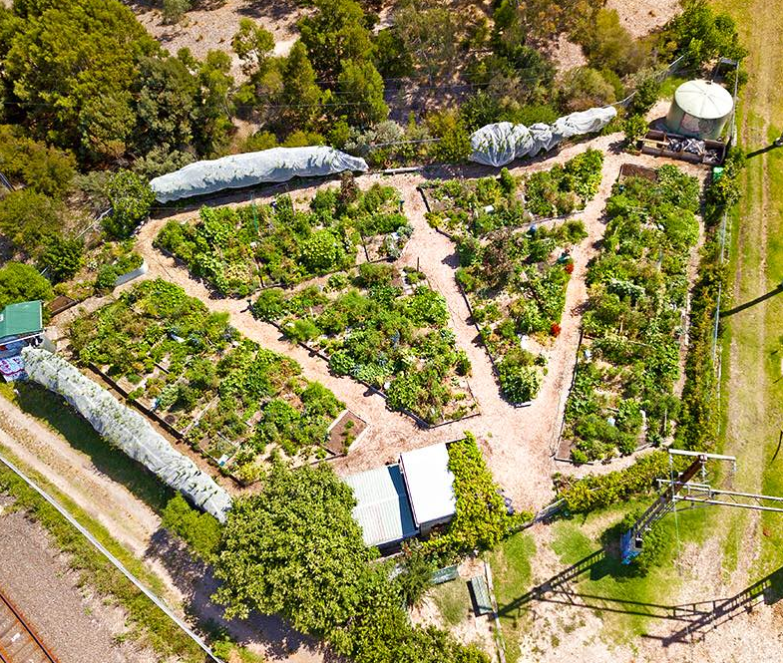
Rushall Garden in Melbourne, Australia, on land that was formerly a railway junction

=== Plant choice and physical layout ===
Food production is central to most community and allotment gardens. However, restoration of natural areas and native plant gardens are also popular, as are "art" gardens. Many gardens include diverse planting elements, combining individual plots with features such as small orchards, herb gardens, and butterfly gardens. Individual plots are often highly diverse, incorporating a mix of flowers and vegetables.

Gardeners often grow in-ground—this type of garden contrasts most with an urban environment. Gardeners may also grow in raised beds, or in boxes, sometimes on top of a paved area. Gardens may include raised for use by people who cannot bend or work directly on the ground.

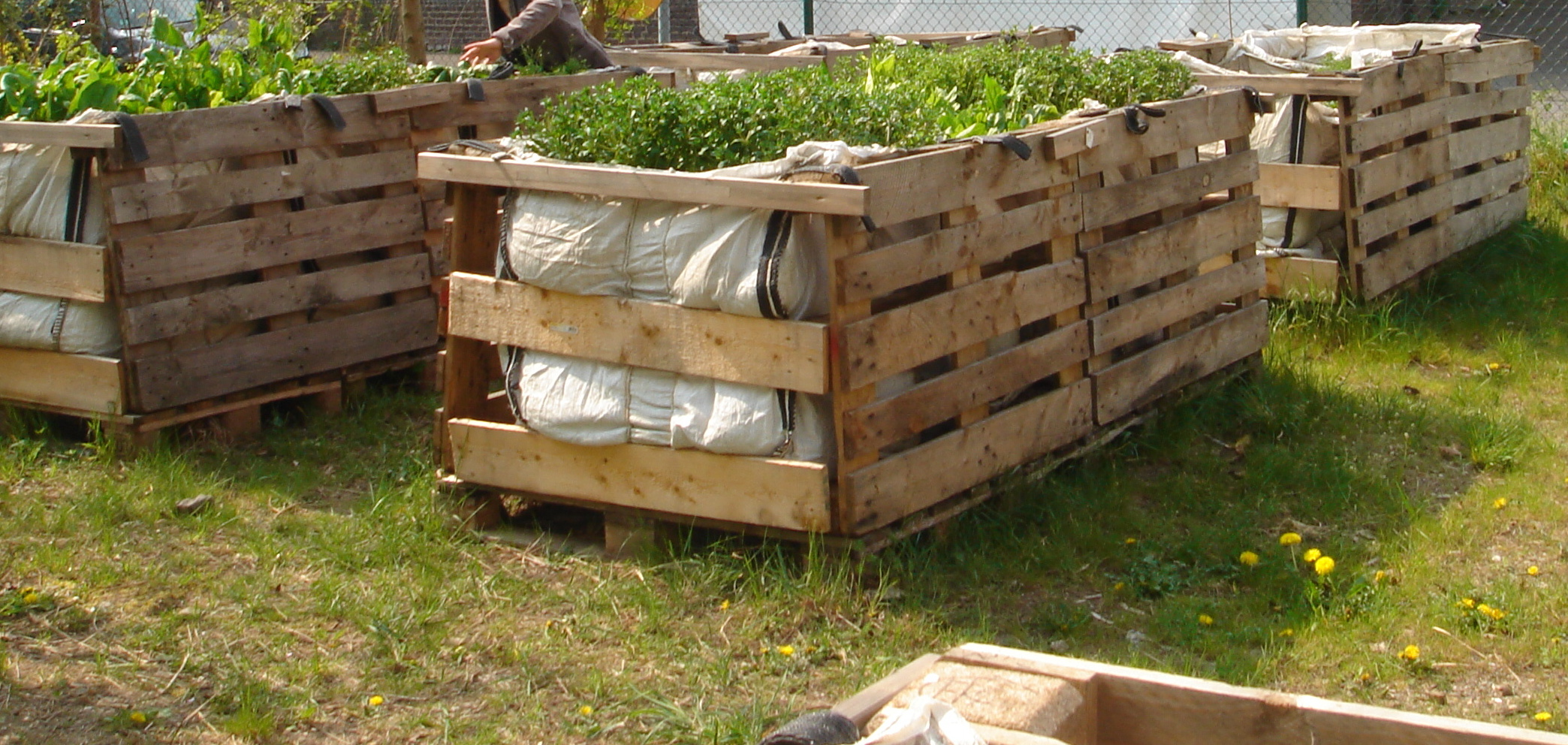
Gardening in raised boxes

Regardless of plant choice, planning out the garden layout beforehand will help avoid problems down the line. According to the Arizona Master Gardener Manual, taking measurements of the garden size, sunlight locations and planted crops vs. yield quantity, will ensure a detailed record that helps when making decisions for the coming years. Other considerations when laying out a plot are efficient use of space by using trellises for climbing crops, plant location so that taller plants (like sunflowers) do not block needed sunlight to shorter plants and grouping plants that have similar life cycles close together.

=== Group and leadership selection ===
Community gardeners in North America may be of any cultural background, young or old, new gardeners or seasoned growers, rich or poor. Because of this diversity, when gardeners share their harvest, they often learn about cultural foods created from the plants grown by other gardeners.

Some community gardens "self-support" through membership dues, and others require a sponsor for tools, seeds, or money donations. Support may come from churches, schools, private businesses or parks and recreation departments. Local nonprofit beautification and community-building organizations may contribute as well.

There are many different organizational models in use for community gardens. Most elect their leaders from within their membership. Others are run by individuals appointed by their management or sponsor. Some are managed by non-profit organizations, such as a community gardening association, a community association, a church, or other land-owner, others by a city's recreation or parks department, a school or a university.

Gardens are often started when neighbors come together to commit to the organization, construction and management of a garden, and are assisted by experienced organizers such as the Green Guerillas of New York City. Alternatively, a garden may be organized "top down" by a municipal agency. In Santa Clara, California a non-profit by the name of Appleseeds offers free assistance in starting up new community gardens around the world. Rules and an 'operations manual' are invaluable tools; ideas for both are available at the American Community Gardening Association and in the United States, from local master gardeners and cooperative extensions.

=== Membership fees ===
In most cases, gardeners are expected to pay monthly or annual dues to pay for water, infrastructure, garden-provided tools, water hoses, ordinary maintenance, etc.

=== Health effects of community gardens ===
Community gardens have been shown to have positive health effects on those who participate in the programs, particularly in the areas of decreasing body mass index and lower rates of obesity. Studies have found that community gardens in schools have been found to improve average body mass index in children. A 2013 study found that 17% of obese or overweight children improved their body mass index over seven weeks. Specifically, 13% of the obese children achieved a lower body mass index in the overweight range, while 23% of overweight children achieved a normal body mass index.

There is some evidence to suggest that community gardens have a similar effect in adults. A study found that community gardeners in Utah had a lower body mass index than their non-gardening siblings and unrelated neighbors. Administrative records were used to compare body mass indexes of community gardeners to that of unrelated neighbors, siblings, and spouses. Gardeners were less likely to be overweight or obese than their neighbors, and gardeners had lower body mass indexes than their siblings. However, there was no difference in body mass index between gardeners and their spouses which may suggest that community gardening creates healthy habits for the entire household..

Participation in a community garden has been shown to increase both availability and consumption of fruits and vegetables in households. A study showed an average increase in availability of 2.55 fruits and 4.3 vegetables with participation in a community garden. It also showed that children in participating households consumed an average of two additional servings per week of fruits and 4.9 additional servings per week of vegetables.

Community gardens also have notable positive effects on mental health and well-being. Participation in gardening activities has been associated with reduced stress, enhanced mood, and improved overall mental health. Studies show that engaging in community gardening fosters a sense of belonging and social connectedness, which can mitigate feelings of loneliness and isolation, particularly in urban environments. For instance, community gardens provide safe, communal spaces where individuals can form social bonds, build relationships, and support each other through shared activities. These interactions can help create resilient communities by improving both individual mental health and broader social networks.

=== Policy implications ===
There is strong support among American adults for local and state policies and policy changes that support community gardens. A study found that 47.2% of American adults supported such policies. However, community gardens compete with the interests of developers.

Policies can be enacted to protect community gardens from future development. For example, New York State reached a settlement in 2002 which protected hundreds of community gardens which had been established by the Parks and Recreation Department GreenThumb Program from future development.

At times, zoning policy lags behind the development of community gardens. In these cases, community gardens may exist illegally. Such was the case in Detroit when hundreds of community gardens were created in abandoned spaces around the city. The city of Detroit created agricultural zones in 2013 in the middle of urban areas to legitimize the over 355 "illegal" community gardens.

== Examples ==
=== Australia ===
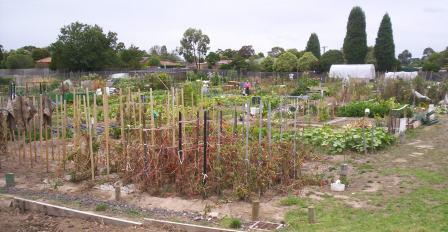
Community Garden, Melbourne, Australia

The first Australian community garden was established in 1977 in Nunawading, Victoria followed soon after by Ringwood Community Garden in March 1980. Hawthorn Community Gardens were also established in 1980. In 2025 there were around 800 community gardens.

=== Czech Republic ===
The trend of community gardening in the Czech Republic is increasing. The first community garden was founded in 2002 and in 2020 there are more than 100.

=== Japan ===
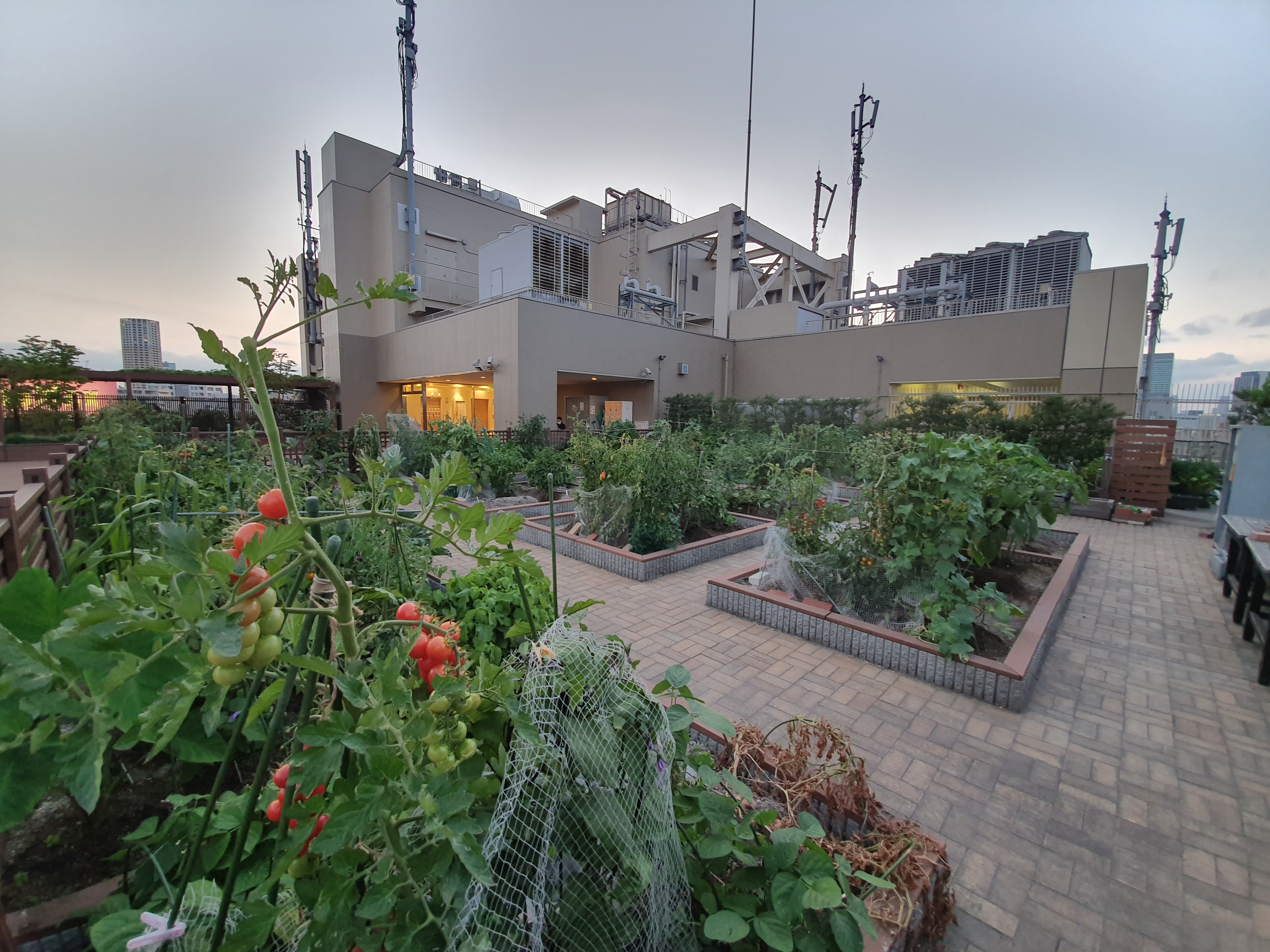
Flourishing rooftop farm near Tokyo

In Japan, rooftops on some train stations have been transformed into community gardens. Plots are rented to local residents for $980 per year. These community gardens have become active open spaces now.

=== Mali ===
Often externally supported, community gardens become increasingly important in developing countries, such as West African (Mali) to bridge the gap between supply and requirements for micro-nutrients and at the same time strengthen an inclusive development.

=== Singapore ===
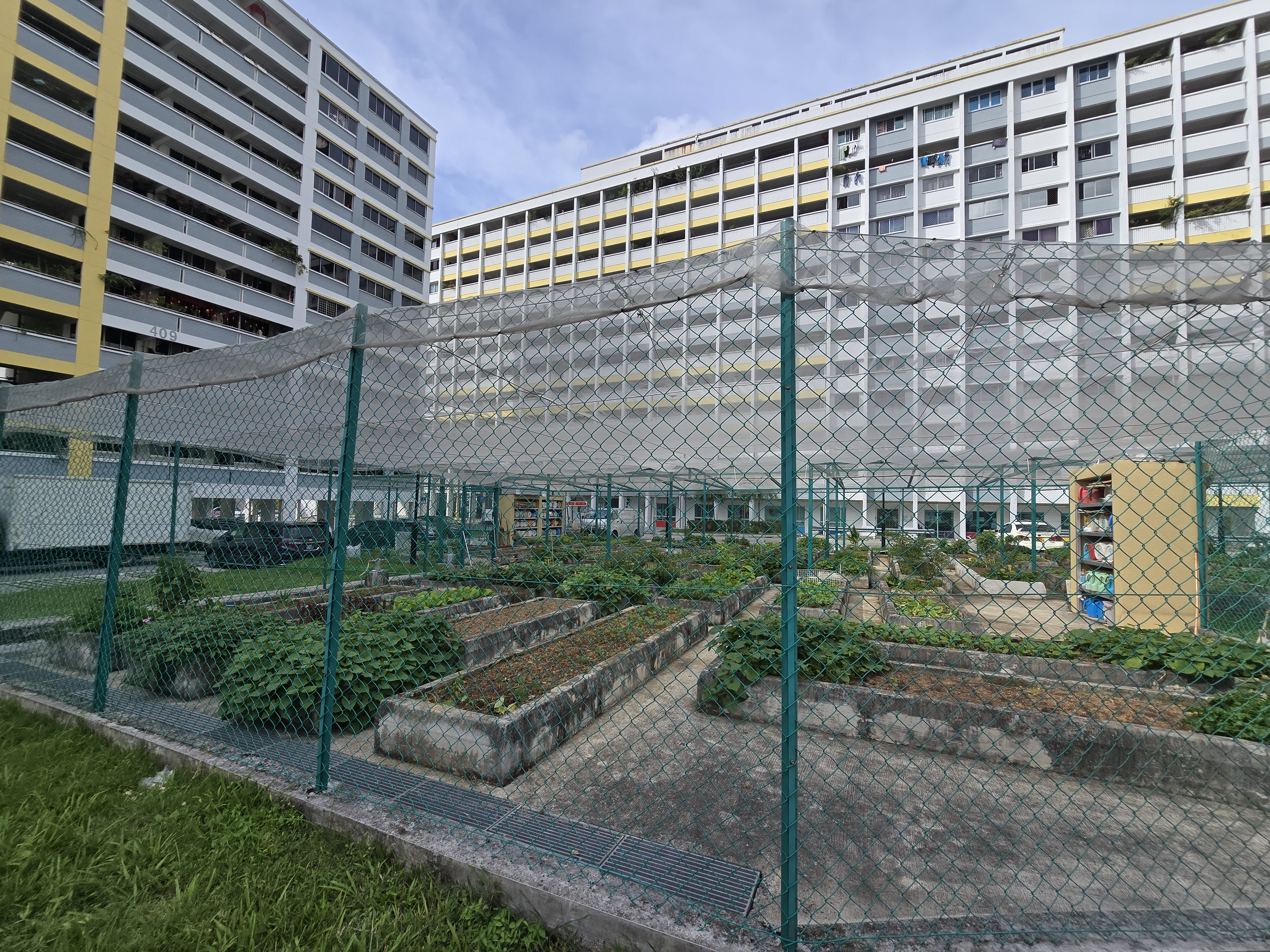
Bukit Panjang Zone 8 Residents Committee Community Garden in Bukit Panjang, Singapore

Community gardens in Singapore are communal sites located in a neighborhood that are individually or collectively gardened by a group of people. Community gardening has been practiced in Singapore since the country was under colonial British rule. Since then, it has changed from being a practice overseen by the government, to a citizen-led initiative by members of the community. In the present day, most community gardens in Singapore have been established as part of the 'Community in Bloom' (CIB) initiative of the National Parks Board (NParks), with allotment gardens and non-profit community gardens constituting the other types of community gardens in Singapore. A typical layout of a community garden consists of a fenced-off space with a number of edible and non-edible varieties cultivated in organized sections. They provide various mental health and social benefits to their users, while also promoting environmental education and supporting local biodiversity. As of 2025, there are over 2000 community gardens set up across Singapore.

=== Spain ===
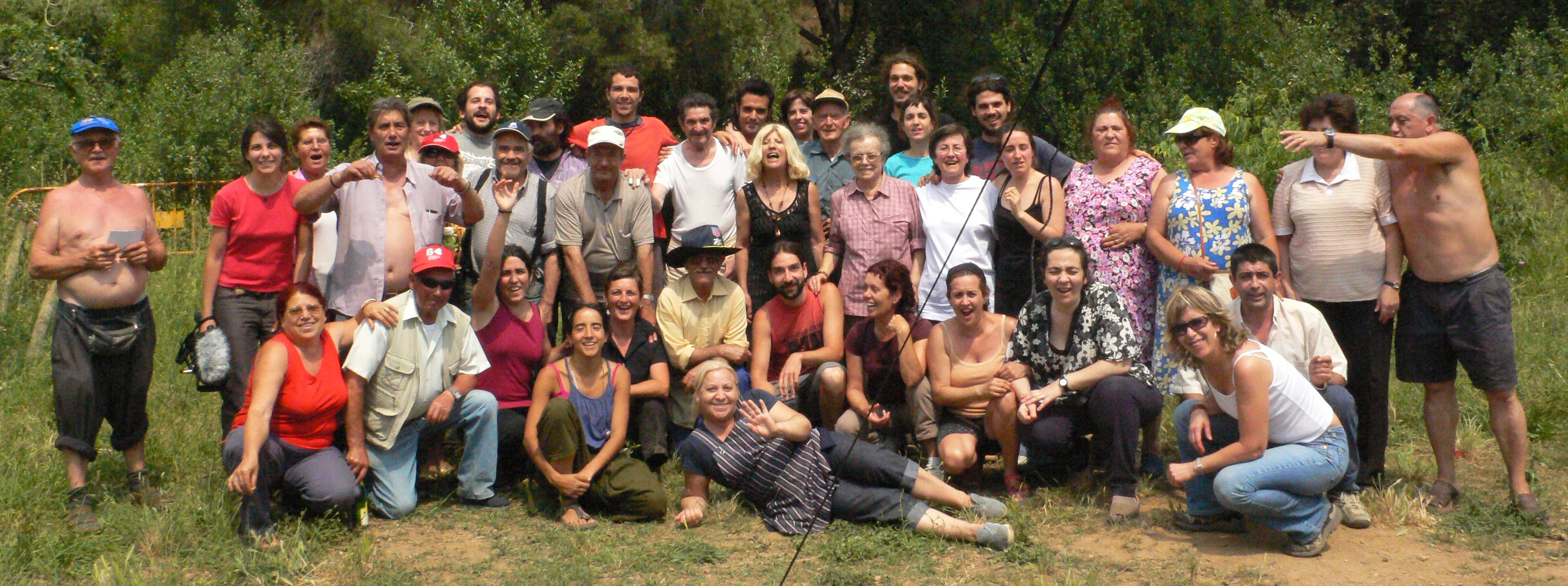
The squatted social center Can Masdeu is home to one of the largest community gardens in Barcelona.

Most older Spaniards grew up in the countryside and moved to the city to find work. Strong family ties often keep them from retiring to the countryside, and so urban community gardens are in great demand. Potlucks and paellas are common, as well as regular meetings to manage the affairs of the garden.

=== Taiwan ===
There is an extensive network of community gardens and collective urban farms in Taipei City often occupying areas of the city that are waiting for development. Flood-prone river banks and other areas unsuitable for urban construction often become legal or illegal community gardens. The network of the community gardens of Taipei are referred to as Taipei organic acupuncture of the industrial city.

=== United Kingdom ===
In the United Kingdom, community gardening is generally distinct from allotment gardening, though the distinction is sometimes blurred. Allotments are generally plots of land let to individuals for their cultivation by local authorities or other public bodies—the upkeep of the land is usually the responsibility of the individual plot owners. Allotments tend (but not invariably) to be situated around the outskirts of built-up areas. Use of allotment areas as open space or play areas is generally discouraged. However, there are an increasing number of community-managed allotments, which may include allotment plots and a community garden area. Many of the community gardens are members of Social Farms & Gardens (a registered charity).

The community garden movement is of more recent provenance than allotment gardening, with many such gardens in built-up areas on patches of derelict land, waste ground or land owned by the local authority or a private landlord that is not being used for any purpose. They can also be on more rural land, often in partnership with a farmer or estate owner. A community garden in the United Kingdom is typically run by people from the local community as an independent, non-profit association or organization, or registered charity (though this may be wholly or partly funded by public money).

It is also likely to perform a dual function as an open space or play area (in which role it may also be known as a 'city park') and—while it may offer plots to individual cultivators—the organization that administers the garden will normally have a great deal of the responsibility for its planting, landscaping and upkeep. Examples of inner-city gardens of this sort in London are Calthorpe Community Garden in King's Cross, Islington's Culpeper Community Garden and Camden's Phoenix Garden.

In the UK, not all community gardens are constituted in the same way. The London-based examples above are registered charities, however, other community-garden and food-growing initiatives operate under different structures (such as a constituted community group). An example of this is Norwich's Fifth Quarter gardens and community group.

A significant addition to the community gardening movement in the United Kingdom was initited with the launch of Incredible Edible in 2008. Many local Incredible Edible groups now exist to champion and connect food-growing initiatives across local, regional and national networks.

=== United States ===
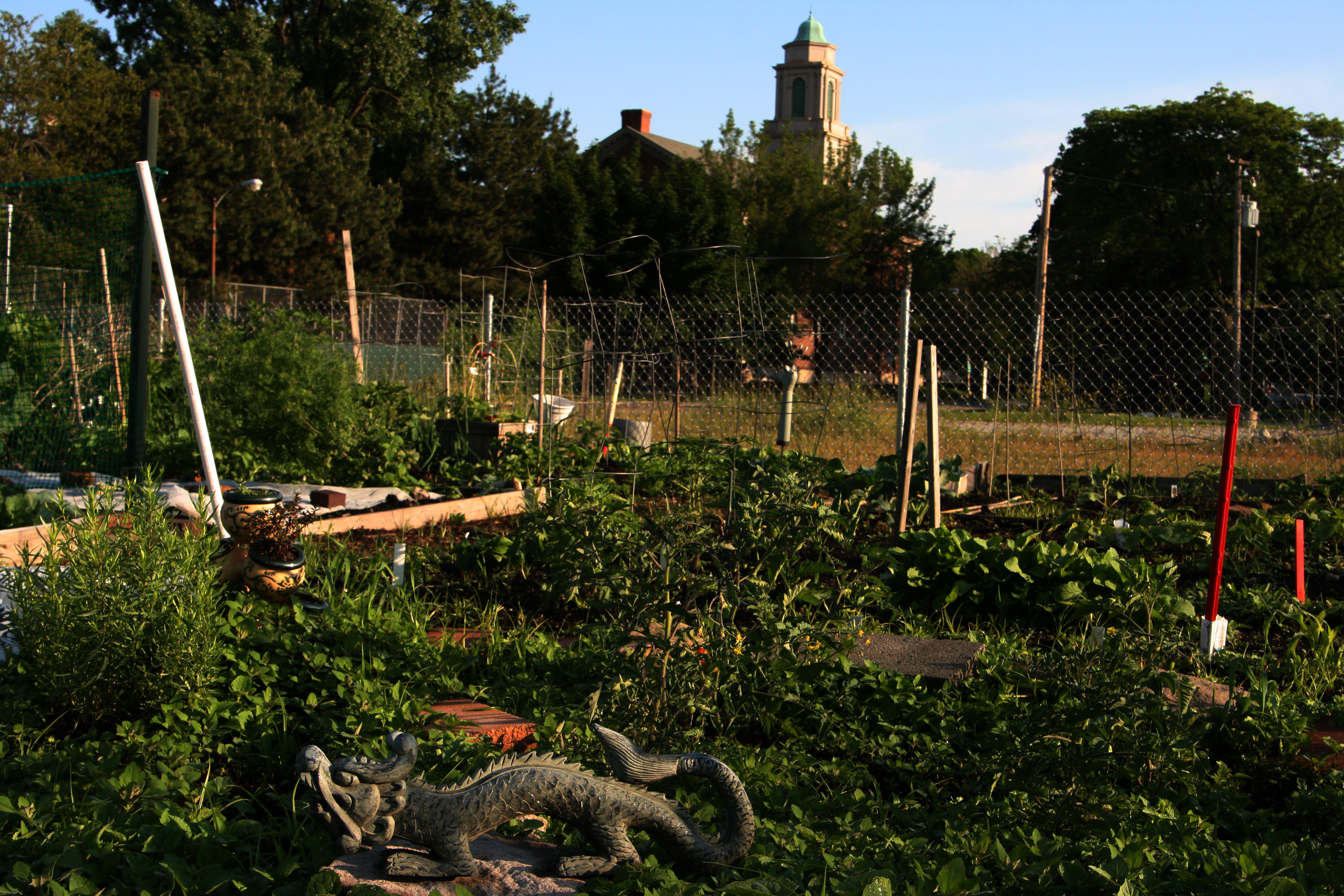
61st St. Community Garden, Chicago

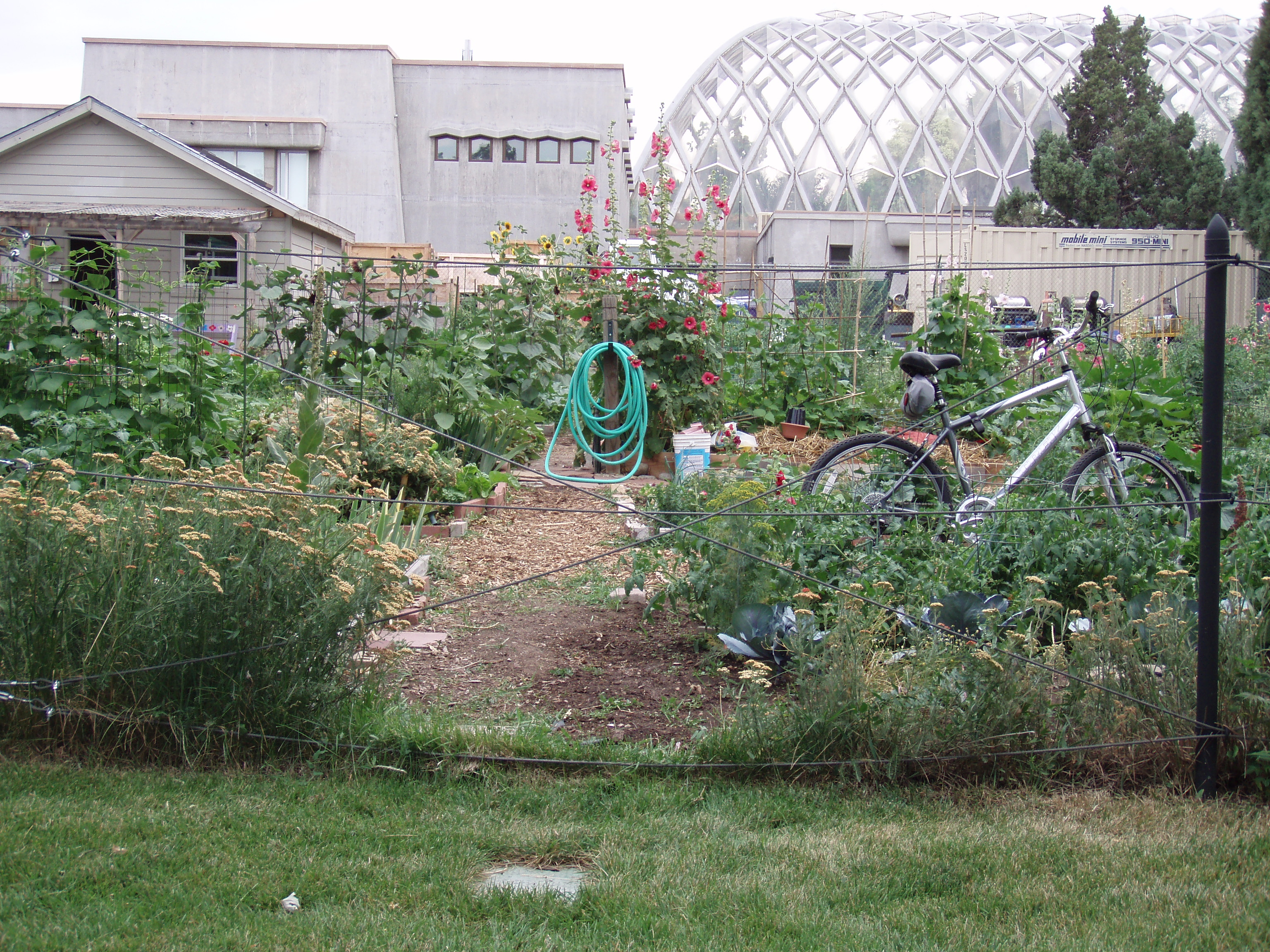
Community garden, Denver, Colorado

Community gardens in the United States benefit both gardeners and society at large. Community gardens provide fresh produce to gardeners and their friends and neighbors. They provide a place of connection to nature and to other people. In a wider sense, community gardens provide green space, a habitat for insects and animals, sites for gardening education, and beautification of the local area. Community gardens provide access to land to those who otherwise could not have a garden, such as apartment-dwellers, the elderly, and the homeless. Many gardens resemble European allotment gardens, with plots or boxes where individuals and families can grow vegetables and flowers, including a number which began as victory gardens during World War II. Other gardens are worked as community farms with no individual plots at all, similar to urban farms.

== See also ==
- Commons
- Community orchard
- Community-supported agriculture
