= Incredible Edible =

Urban gardening project

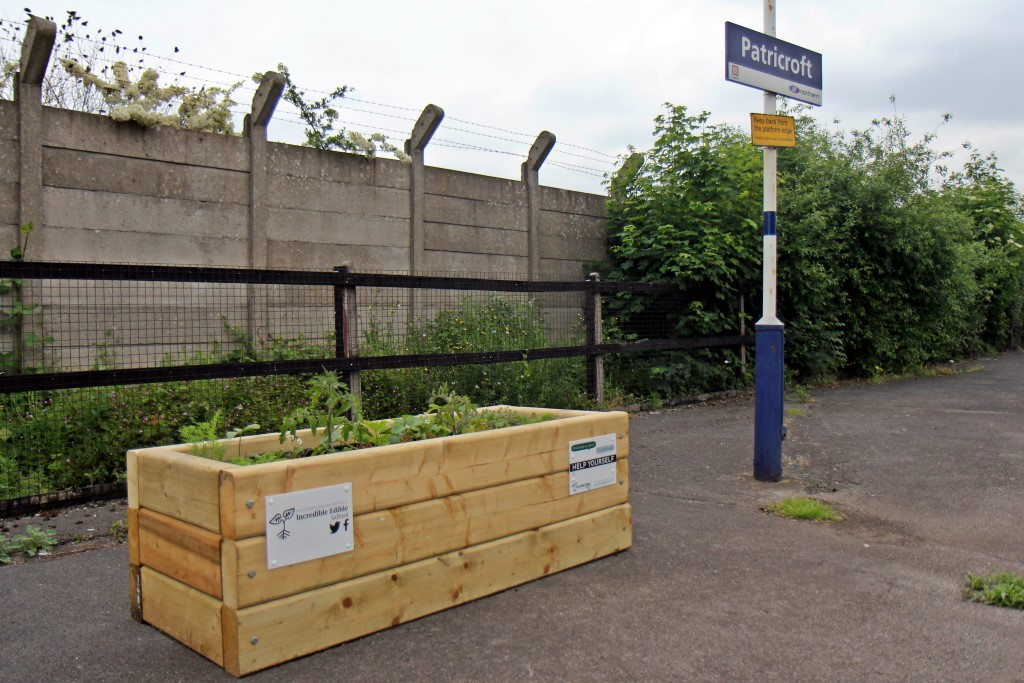

The Incredible Edible project is an urban gardening project which was started in 2008 by Pamela Warhurst, Mary Clear and a group of like minded people in Todmorden, West Yorkshire, UK. The project aims to bring people together through actions around local food and community allotments, helping to change behaviour towards the environment and to build a kinder and more resilient world. In some cases, it also envisions to have the groups become self-sufficient in food production, hence having all food being produced locally.

== History ==
The Incredible Edible Todmorden community group was first established in 2007 in Todmorden, West Yorkshire, UK. Local residents, led by Pamela Warhurst and Mary Clear, came up with the idea in response to increasing global concerns over climate change, food sustainability, and community change. Two years later, the community group officially became an Ltd for the purposes of fulfilling the legal and financial obligations of the group. In 2010, the first Incredible Edible farm, a one-acre plot, began to supply its fresh produce to local businesses. By 2012, the Incredible Edible Network was formed to help manage and sustain existing groups as well as inspiring new ones. Since its emergence, the Incredible Edible idea has spread to hundreds of communities around the world. Today, there are 120 official Incredible Edible groups in the UK and over 700 worldwide. In the UK, the success of these collective groups has directly influenced policies on both a local and national level.

"At first, we had trouble getting people to help themselves, because we're from a country where people say, 'Get off my land', so we had to tell people it was OK .... nearly 50% said it had had a positive impact on their income." -- Mary Clear

In 2009, Prince Charles visited the Incredible Edible Todmorden project in support. The group meets regularly at Todmorden Unitarian Church and manages plantings and other food producing projects throughout the town.

== Community Plates ==
The Incredible Edible model, developed in Todmorden, revolves around the metaphor of three “spinning plates.” The first, community, refers to growing food on public spaces that anyone is allowed to take from. By accomplishing this, it hopes to transform people's relationship to the environment and spark new conversations. The second plate, business, means supporting local-food firms. Whether it is local food producers, distributors, or restaurants, the goal of this plate is to strengthen the local economy through things like vegetable tourism. The third and final plate is learning. The idea of this plate it to incorporate the first two plates by educating and passing on skills. It strives to engage with schools, local farmers, and businesses by sharing knowledge and passion for food growing and cooking.

== Impact ==
On a local scale, Todmorden has experienced a complete transformation. In 2018, 49 new UK Incredible Edible groups took their first steps. Additionally, group members have invested the equivalent of 14.5 years total of their time to give back to communities in the UK. Along the way, they have provided meaningful social and physical activities for 4,861 people nationwide. A total of 207 events have featured the Incredible Edible, and the organization currently collaborates with 11 other groups, including councils and nonprofits, to enhance their work. From a food standpoint, the organization has increased its total produce output by 37% in the past year. It currently grows food on 9,763 sqm of land. On a global scale, their influence is still prevalent. The main website has been viewed by over 14,500 people. 742 people have signed up for their newsletter as well. Their marketplace has shared more than 40 stories of its journey and message, too. More recently, the Incredible Edible received a £500,000 grant from the Big Lottery Fund and a donation of land from Calderdale Council. The majority of this funding has been used to create a new £750,000 aquaponics unit.
