= Thomas Rogers (MP) =

English merchant and banker

Thomas Rogers (1735–1793) was an English merchant and banker. He served as Member of Parliament for Coventry from late 1780 to early 1781.

== Early life ==
He was the son of Thomas Rogers of Amblecote, Staffordshire, and his wife Martha Knight, daughter of the ironmaster Richard Knight of Downton Hall in Shropshire. He went into commerce working in Cheapside, London, for Daniel Radford of Stoke Newington, in a warehouse of which his father was joint owner with Radford.

Amblecote, not far north of Stourbridge, was then a hamlet. Thomas Rogers the elder, who died in 1775, lived there at "The Hill". It was a "spacious brick mansion", "approached by a long and lofty avenue of sycamores". He was in business as a manufacturer of glass. "Glass houses" had been introduced to the Stourbridge area at the beginning of the 17th century by Huguenot families, and Amblecote was an important source of clay suitable for "glass pots" (crucibles). The elder Thomas Rogers was the son of Paul Rogers, a glassmaker at Amblecote, as his father and grandfather had been. He left his son Thomas land at Kingswinford.

Rogers went into business with the Cornhill bankers George and Thomas Welch, with Welch & Rogers trading in 1765 or 1766. The bank traded from 1785 as Welch, Rogers, Olding & Rogers. Olding, the principal clerk, was a salaried partner from 1771, and a named partner from 1778. Two sons of Rogers, Thomas Jr. and Samuel, were brought in from 1784. His major partner George Welch (died 1796) was an nonconformist activist with connections to Poole, and Harbour Grace in Newfoundland, who supported the dissenting academy run by David Bogue at Gosport.

Rogers adopted the Presbyterian views of his wife. In 1767 he became treasurer of the Newington Green meeting-house, where his neighbour Richard Price was minister. Rogers and Price formed a small club with James Burgh who ran an academy in Stoke Newington, and its rector Ralph Thoresby the younger (1698–1763), son of Ralph Thoresby FRS. The Rogers house was No. 52 Newington Green, and Price lived at No. 54; the numbering in those days was not consecutive, since in 1767 Rogers joined his house to No. 55 which was adjacent.

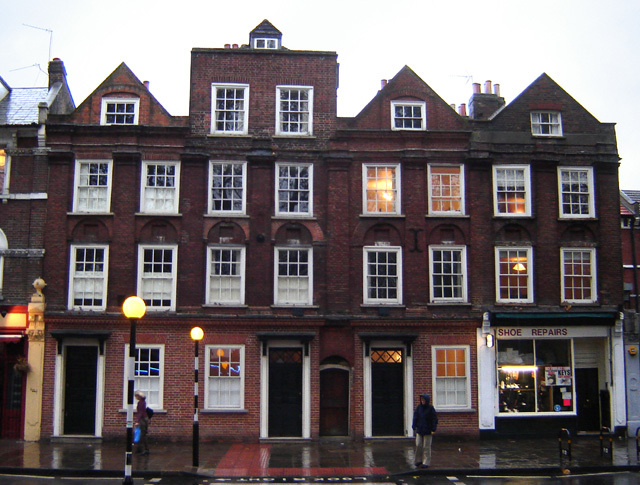
Newington Green terrace, with the surviving houses of Thomas Rogers and Richard Price

== 1780 election ==
Rogers opposed British policy in the American Revolutionary War. In April 1780, Price and Rogers were founding members of the Society for Constitutional Information. Carl Cone comments that while Rogers and associates desired parliamentary reform, and Rogers was averse to the landed nobility, they were not believers in democracy in the modern sense. Price adopted John Horne Tooke as a close ally from this time, but Rogers distrusted him.

With Sir Thomas Hallifax, Rogers stood in the 1780 general election as parliamentary candidate for Coventry, a two-member constituency. Edward Roe Yeo and John Baker Holroyd, their opponents, were supporters of the North administration, while Hallifax and Rogers had the backing of the Coventry corporation. Hallifax had a political connection with Coventry through the bank Vere, Glyn & Hallifax of which he was a founder, with Sir Richard Glyn. Glyn had died in 1773, while sitting as member of parliament for Coventry. In fact, though, Glyn had been an opponent of Coventry corporation. Opponents dubbed Rogers the "Dismal Squire", to Hallifax's "Dumb Knight". The first poll held was marred by continual rioting around the polling booth, and was abandoned after eight days without a significant proportion of potential votes cast. In the second poll, held over 24 days and ending 29 December, Hallifax and Rogers were declared narrow winners. The result was overturned in parliament on 27 February 1781.

== Later life ==
Rogers was on the founding committee of the New College at Hackney in 1786. In 1787 an anonymous pamphlet Salutary Admonitions attacking the college was addressed to Rogers; David Williams is now identified as its author. In 1791 Rogers was chairing the college's committee. The committee contained ten members of the Revolution Society, and held a dinner for the radical Tom Paine.

In 1790, Rogers was, according to Price, a prime mover with friends of the dinner held at the Crown and Anchor, Strand, to celebrate the first Bastille Day anniversary, coinciding with the Fête de la Fédération held in France. It was reported that 600 people attended, with cockades. Rogers in 1792 was a signatory to a resolution of the Society of the Friends of the People on political reform.

== Family ==
Rogers married in 1760 Mary Radford, daughter of Daniel Radford. They had eight children, the third son being the poet Samuel Rogers. Of the children, seven survived their father:

- Daniel Rogers (died 1829) lived at "The Hill", Amblecote, and then at Wassell Grove, parish of Hagley. He was admitted to Queens' College, Cambridge in 1779, and to Lincoln's Inn in 1783. He married Martha Bowles, daughter of Sampson Bowles, and they had six sons and four daughters.
- Thomas Rogers (1761–1788).
- Samuel Rogers, third son, was left a stake in the family bank and an income of £5,000 per year by his father, who disapproved of Daniel's marriage. Samuel sold the family house on Newington Green in 1797. He passed control of the family bank in operational matters to his younger brother Henry in 1802.
- Henry Rogers (died 1833, unmarried).
- Martha (died 1835), eldest daughter, married in 1792 the banker John Towgood (1757–1837).
- Maria, married in 1795 Sutton Sharpe, the brewer, and was mother of the banker Samuel Sharpe, died in childbirth 1806.
- Sarah (died 1855, unmarried).

A son Paul died an infant in 1768.

=== Bank merger ===
The Towgood family bank was merged into the Rogers bank in 1811. It went back to the bank Langston, Twogood & Amory, founded in 1777 by James Haughton Langston, a wine merchant and father of John Langston.

John Towgood's father Matthew Towgood III, son of Michaijah Towgood, was in early life a Presbyterian minister. He then moved to London where he was a banker, and a trustee of Hackney New College. His mother Mary Mills was sister of the banker John Mills (died 1759). Involved in a mortgage of a plantation on St Kitts, John Towgood received some compensation for enslaved people there. The banker Matthew Towgood IV (1761–1830) went into business with Bloxham & Fourdrinier and ended up owner of their paper mill at St Neots. D. C. Coleman has suggested the reason Towgood became a partner in Bloxham & Fourdrinier c.1808 may have been a loan extended by Langston, Towgood & Co.
