= Hamer Stansfeld =

British woolen merchant, mayor of Leeds in 1843, activist and author (1797–1865)

Alderman Hamer Stansfeld JP

Mayor of Leeds
- In office 1843–1844
- Preceded by: Henry Cowper Marshall
- Succeeded by: Darnton Lupton

Alderman of Leeds
- In office 1835–1847

Personal details
- Born: 17 February 1797 Leeds, Yorkshire
- Died: 1865 Ilkley, Yorkshire
- Resting place: Westmorland
- Party: Radical; Liberal
- Spouse: Ellen Towgood (m. 1845; died 1865)
- Parent(s): David Stansfeld; Sarah Wolrich
- Relatives: Sir James Stansfeld; William Crompton-Stansfield; James Rawdon Stansfeld; Thomas Wolryche Stansfeld; John R. E. Stansfeld
- Occupation: Merchant; Politician

Hamer Stansfeld JP (/ˈstænsfiːld/ STANSS-feeld; 17 February 1797 – 1865) was a British merchant and Radical and Liberal politician who represented Leeds as Mayor (1843–44) and Alderman (from 1835), and led the development of the first custom-built hydropathic hotel, the Ben Rhydding Hydro (1844).

Prominent in the Anti-Corn Law League and as a proponent of the extension of the electoral franchise and state-funded education, he was also known for his writings on currency and money supply and for a dispute, played out in the local press, with the High Churchman and Tractarian Walter Hook, Vicar of Leeds.

== Background ==
Hamer Stansfeld was born on 17 February 1797, the ninth son and thirteenth child of the merchant David Stansfeld (1755–1818), of Leeds, Yorkshire, and his wife Sarah Wolrich (1757–1824), daughter of Thomas Wolrich (1719–91) of Armley House, Leeds; and grandson of David Stansfeld (1720–69) of Hope Hall, Halifax, Yorkshire. He was a descendant of the Stansfeld family of Stansfield and Sowerby, Yorkshire, uncle of the Liberal politician Sir James Stansfeld, and a distant cousin of the politician William Crompton-Stansfield and the soldiers James Rawdon Stansfeld, Thomas Wolryche Stansfeld and John R. E. Stansfeld. He was a member of a very old Yorkshire family, which had for many generations held a position of influence in the county.

== Career ==
=== Business ===
Stansfeld was a junior partner in the textile manufacturing company of Stansfeld, Briggs, and Stansfeld, which succumbed to bankruptcy in the Panic of 1825. Stansfeld was described as "one of the leading mercantile men" in Leeds, and one who took an active part in many of the public affairs of the borough. He is noted as being "in Prussia selling cloth" in c.1839–40.

=== Politics ===
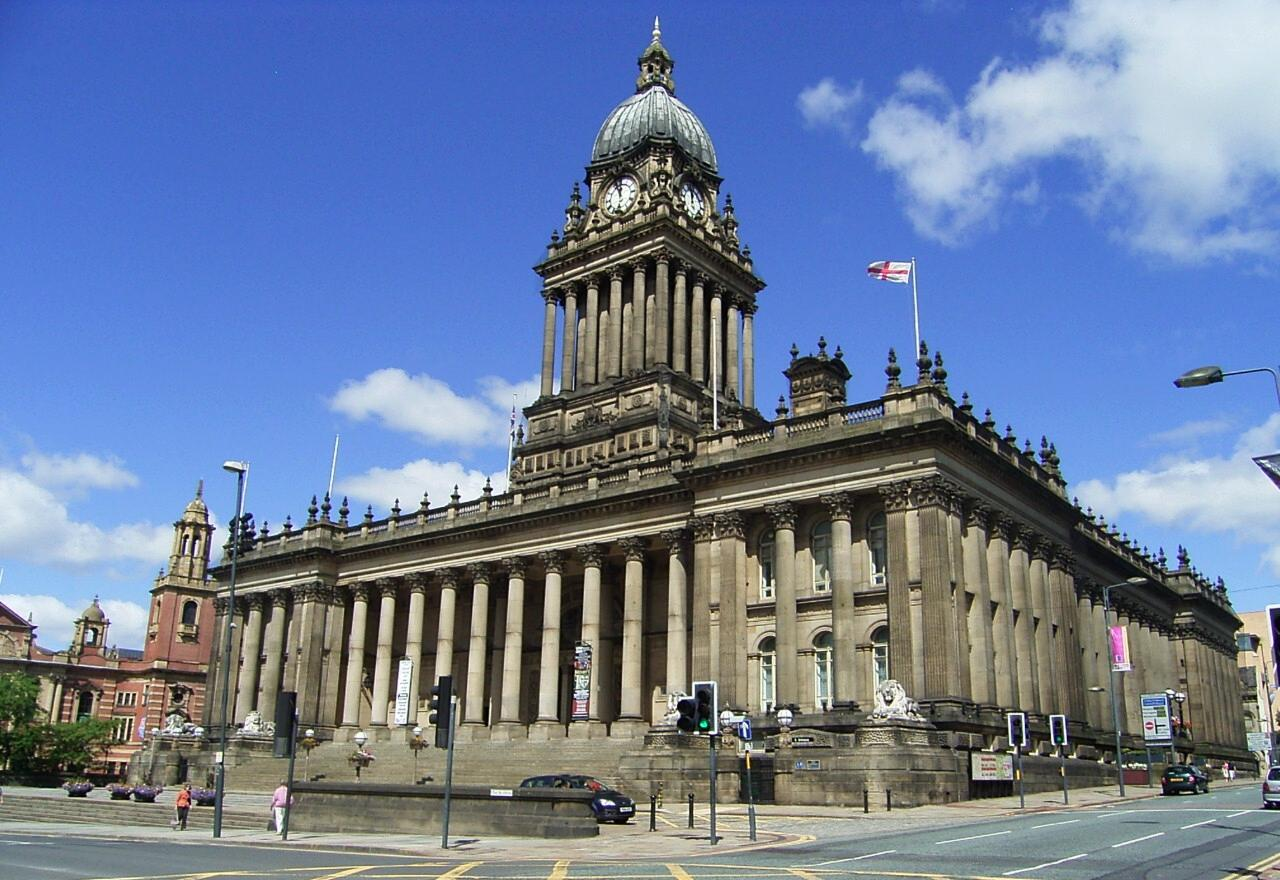
Leeds Town Hall (2007)

Stansfeld became an alderman of Leeds Corporation from after the passing of the Municipal Corporations Act 1835 until 1847, rising to the position of Mayor of Leeds in 1843–44. He was described as one of the most active magistrates on the commission for the peace of the borough of Leeds and was also a Justice of the Peace for the West Riding of Yorkshire.

In his views, Stansfeld was a Liberal radical, a strong advocate of the principles of free trade, and leading member of the Anti-Corn Law League. He corresponded with Richard Cobden and John Bright, and lobbied in London for the interests of the town. He was a supporter of household suffrage for the elective franchise, and in 1837 became president of the Leeds Household Suffrage Association. He was one of the sponsors of the establishment, in April 1844, of the Leeds Friendly Loan Society, which was, in part, designed to make loans to wage-earners who wished to establish their own small businesses. The Leeds Intelligencer of August 1840 noted a number of other platforms on which Stansfeld stood: the entire separation of church and state; expulsion of bishops from the House of Lords; vote by ballot; shortening the duration of parliaments; abolition of church rates; and the reform of ecclesiastical courts.

==== State Education ====
Stansfeld was a zealous advocate of state-assisted education and an opponent of Edward Baines who argued for voluntaryism in the provision of education. The question of whether educational provision should be voluntary or state supported proved to be a key issue in Leeds and, in 1847, caused a split in Liberal ranks during the parliamentary election which returned (perhaps against expectations (Note: Beckett had, despite a contrary pledge to his electors, voted in favour of corn-law repeal.)) William Beckett, a Conservative; and James Garth Marshall, a Liberal whose election committee was chaired by Stansfeld. Edward Baines's favoured candidate, the Radical Joseph Sturge, was not elected. Though Baines lost this contest, the "Bainesocracy" in municipal Leeds achieved a measure of payback when Stansfeld failed to be re-elected to the Leeds Corporation later in 1847.

==== Church Rates and the Church of England ====
Stansfeld's opposition to church rates placed him against Walter Hook, Vicar of Leeds, and Leeds Tories, who supported their reimposition. The Tories made a political issue of the dispute and, in April 1840, launched a personal attack on Stansfeld, alleging that his position constituted a breach of the oath he had taken as Alderman, to '...never exercise any power authority or influence which I may possess by virtue of the office of Alderman to injure or weaken the Protestant Church....' The Tories first made an indirect and oblique criticism of Stansfeld within the Council chamber; later, they organised an unsuccessful petition to The Marquess of Normanby, the Home Secretary, calling for Stansfeld's removal as Alderman. Stansfeld defended himself by drawing the distinction between actions taken as Alderman, and those of a private individual. As was normal for the times, the dispute played out through correspondence in local newspapers.

In 1843, Stansfeld became embroiled in a theological controversy when Walter Hook publicly challenged an assertion Stansfeld had made in a speech, that a tract taking a Puseyite stance on matrimony had been published in Leeds. The incident played out via letters republished in local newspapers, and reflected a concern held in the town as to whether Hook, given his High Church views, could be considered a Protestant. Stansfeld, himself, was a Unitarian, and he laid the foundation stone of the 1848 Mill Hill Chapel in City Square, Leeds.

==== Hydrotherapy and the Ben Rhydding Hydro ====
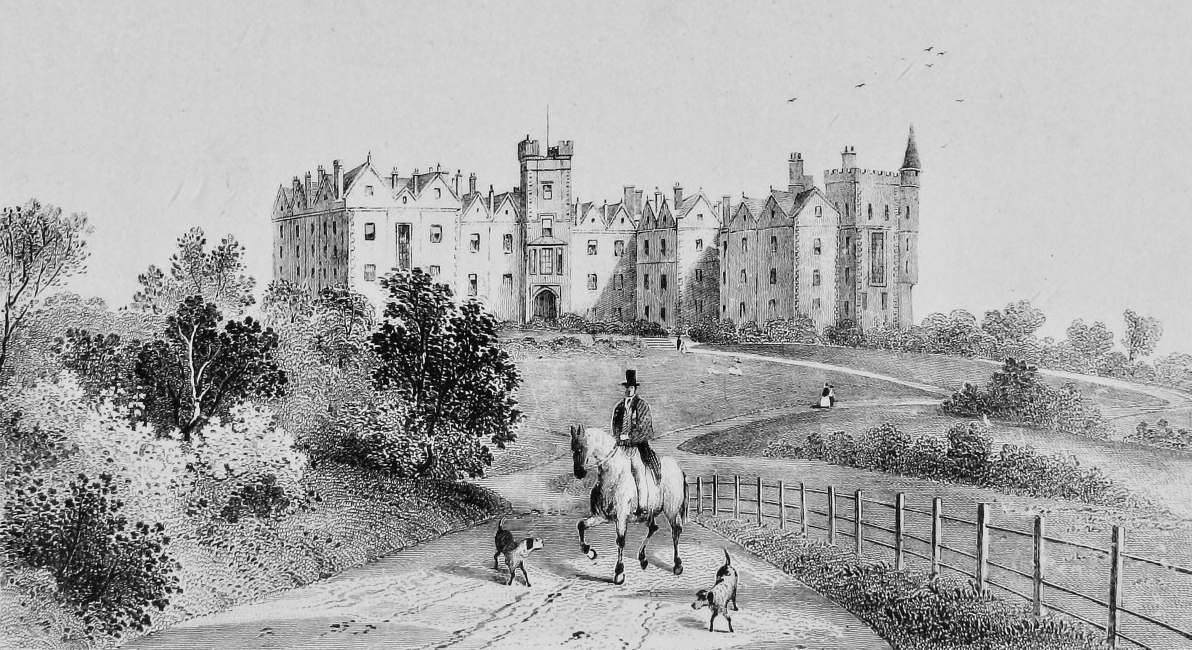
Wharfedale Hydropathic Establishment and Ben Rhydding Hotel c. 1861

Stansfeld had travelled in Europe in 1843, where he was introduced to, and persuaded of, the benefits of hydrotherapy as practiced by Vincenz Priessnitz in Gräfenberg, Austrian Silesia. In his advocation of hydrotherapy, Stansfeld was also joined by his brother-in-law, the writer, reformer, and activist Frederick Towgood (1807–1860). Stansfeld was one of the first and principal shareholders in the establishment of the first custom-built hydropathic hotel, the Wharfedale Hydropathic Establishment and Ben Rhydding Hotel (Ben Rhydding Hydro), in Ben Rhydding near Ilkley, West Yorkshire, which opened in 1844.

==== Money and Banking ====
Stansfeld held strong notions on currency, and was a great advocate of paper money, issued by private banks, as a medium of exchange; he found great fault with the Bank Charter Act 1844 which he saw as the cause of the commercial and banking crisis known as the panic of 1847. He repeatedly put forward his ideas on these subjects in letters to newspapers and journals and in pamphlets which he distributed widely. His works included The Bane and Antidote of Our Monetary System (1857) and Money and the Money Market Explained (1860).

== Personal life ==
Stansfeld married Ellen, daughter of the English banker, industrialist, and papermaker, Matthew Towgood (1761–1831), in 1845. The Stansfelds resided at Headingley Lodge, Headingley (Note: Headingley Lodge: 53.820690°N 1.583310°W) and, in 1849, bought The Grange at Burley in Wharfedale. (Note: The Grange: 53.913365°N 1.749810°W) Stansfeld retired from public life in about the late 1850s, and resided at Highfield in Windermere, Cumbria. (Note: Highfield: 54.385035°N 2.916937°W) He died on 9 June 1865 in Ilkley, and was buried in Westmorland.

The author and reformer Samuel Smiles (1812–1904), who had worked with Stansfeld on radical causes and counted him as a friend, was unstinting in his praise:

Mr Stansfeld was a man for whom I had the greatest esteem. He was frank, free, and open, in all that he did. He possessed the courtesy of the true gentleman; and withal he was intelligent, enlightened, and firm to his purpose. He was full of industry, integrity, and excellence. In a word, his character was sterling. As was said of some one — he had the whitest soul that ever I knew.

Smiles's assessment is matched by an 1845 anecdote in The Spectator, citing the Leeds Mercury:

Several years since, the firm of Stansfeld, Briggs, and Stansfeld, of which Mr. Hamer Stansfeld was a junior partner, became unfortunate. (Note: Stansfeld, Briggs and Stansfeld was a cloth manufacturer of Burley, Leeds, which succumbed to bankruptcy in the Panic of 1825.) Ever since that period, this gentleman has contemplated the payment, if Providence should prosper him, of his share of the debts owing by the above firm; and just previous to his marriage, which took place a few weeks since, he sent round a circular to all his former creditors, accompanied by 20s. in the pound on his proportion of every debt. Such instances of mercantile honour as this should be widely known, in order that they may be both admired and imitated.

== Bibliography ==
- Stansfeld, Hamer (1857). The Bane and Antidote of Our Monetary System Suggested, and the Impolicy of the Bank Charter Act of 1844 Demonstrated, in a Series of Letters and Essays. Webb, Millington, and Company.
- Stansfeld, Hamer (1860). Money and the money market explained and the future rate of discount considered, with an appeal to R. Cobden & J. Bright to fulfil their mission, by procuring free trade in sound money [&c.].
- Hook, Walter Farquhar (1843). Correspondence between the Rev. Dr. Hook and H. Stansfeld, concerning the Puseyite tract on matrimony, including a copy of the tract and Mr. Stansfeld's speech at the Leeds Borough meeting on the Government Education Bill. Together with an article from the Leeds Mercury, "Is Dr. Hook a Protestant?".

== Ancestry ==
Ancestors of Hamer Stansfeld

16. John Stansfeld of Sowerby, Yorkshire
8. Eli Stansfield of Sowerby, Yorkshire
4. David Stansfield of Hope Hall, Halifax, Yorkshire
9. Mary Farrer
2. David Stansfield of Leeds, Yorkshire
10. Rev. Timothy Aldred
5. Ellen Aldred
1. Hamer Stansfeld
12. Toby Wolrich of Armley House, Leeds, Yorkshire
6. Thomas Wolrich of Armley House, Leeds, Yorkshire
13. Penelope Hatton
3. Sarah Wolrich
14. Samuel Hamer of Hamer, Rochdale, Lancashire
7. Margaret Hamer
15. Mary Ibbetson

== See also ==
- James Stansfeld
- William Crompton-Stansfield
- Field House, Sowerby
- Dunninald Castle

== Notes ==
Political offices
Preceded by Henry Cowper Marshall	Mayor of Leeds; 1843 – 1844	Succeeded by Darnton Lupton
