= John Baker Holroyd, 1st Earl of Sheffield =

British Army officer and politician (1735–1821)

The Right Honourable The Earl of Sheffield PC FRS
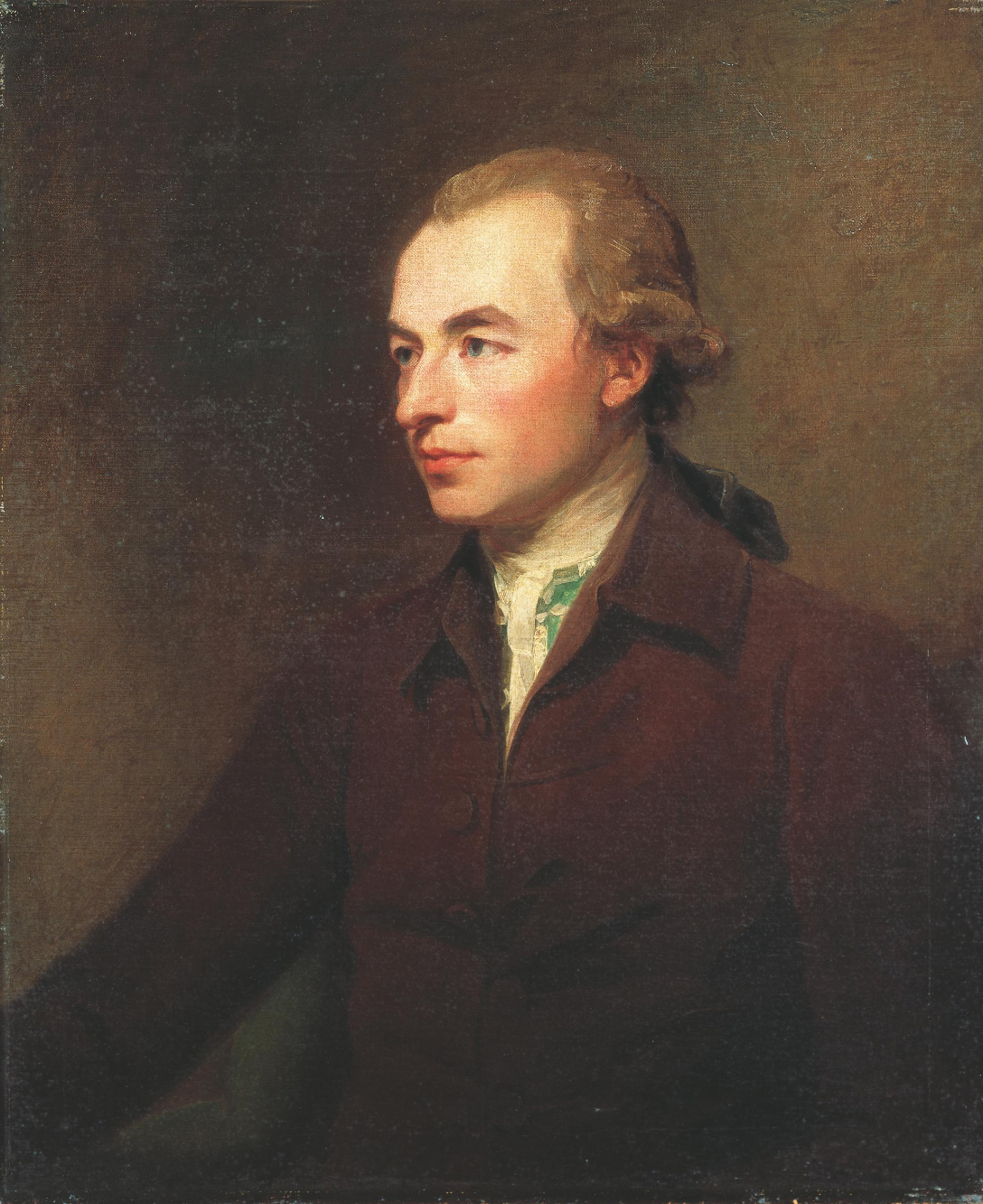
- Portrait by George Romney

Member of Parliament for Coventry
- In office 1780–1784
- Preceded by: Edward Roe Yeo; Walter Waring
- Succeeded by: Sampson Eardley; John Eardley Wilmot

Member of Parliament for Bristol
- In office 1790–1802 Serving with The Marquess of Worcester
- Preceded by: Matthew Brickdale; Henry Cruger
- Succeeded by: Charles Bragge; Evan Baillie

Personal details
- Born: 21 December 1735 County Meath, Ireland
- Died: 30 May 1821 (aged 85) London, England
- Resting place: Sheffield Mausoleum, East Sussex
- Spouse(s): Abigail Way (m. 1767); Hon. Lucy Pelham (m. 1794); Lady Anne North (m. 1798)
- Children: 5, including Maria and George
- Parent(s): Isaac Holyrood; Dorothy Baker

Military service
- Allegiance: Great Britain
- Branch/service: British Army
- Years of service: 1760–1783
- Rank: Lieutenant colonel
- Unit: 21st Light Dragoons (Royal Foresters)
- Commands: 22nd (Light) Dragoons
- Battles/wars: Seven Years' War; American War of Independence

Lieutenant-Colonel John Baker Holroyd, 1st Earl of Sheffield, PC, FRS (21 December 1735 – 30 May 1821) was a British Army officer, politician and writer. He was a leading authority on agriculture and commerce and appointed President of the Board of Agriculture in 1803. He is also remembered as the close friend and patron of eminent historian Edward Gibbon, to whom he acted as literary executor and editor.

== Biography ==
Holroyd was the eldest son of Isaac Holroyd (1708–1778), Esq. of Dunamore, County Meath, and Dorothy Baker (1708–1777). His grandfather was Isaac Holroyd (1643–1706), merchant, belonging to an old Yorkshire family which settled in Ireland after the Restoration. He first took the name of Baker on inheriting the estates of his uncle, Rev. James Baker, in 1768 and added Holroyd on the death of his own father in 1778.

During the Seven Years' War, Holroyd was commissioned into the British Army's 21st Light Dragoons (Royal Foresters) at the rank of cornet in 1760, serving under Lieutenant-general John Manners, Marquess of Granby. He was promoted to captain in 1761 and was discharged in 1763 when the war came to an end. During the American War of Independence, Holroyd rejoined the British army in 1779 and was promoted to acting major. In the same year, he raised the 22nd (Light) Dragoons to defend against a planned Franco-Spanish invasion of Britain which ultimately was never carried out, serving as the regiment's lieutenant-colonel commandant. The regiment was disbanded in 1783 following the end of the war, bringing Holroyd's military career to an end.

In 1763 he travelled for a while on the Continent and in 1764 at Lausanne, Switzerland he became close friends with the writer and historian Edward Gibbon, later the author of The History of the Decline and Fall of the Roman Empire. On his return he used his inherited wealth to buy in 1769 the country house of Sheffield Hall in Sussex for £31,000 from Lord De La Warr. In 1780 he was elected to represent Coventry in the House of Commons, where he was prominent against the anti-Catholic Lord George Gordon and the Gordon rioters.

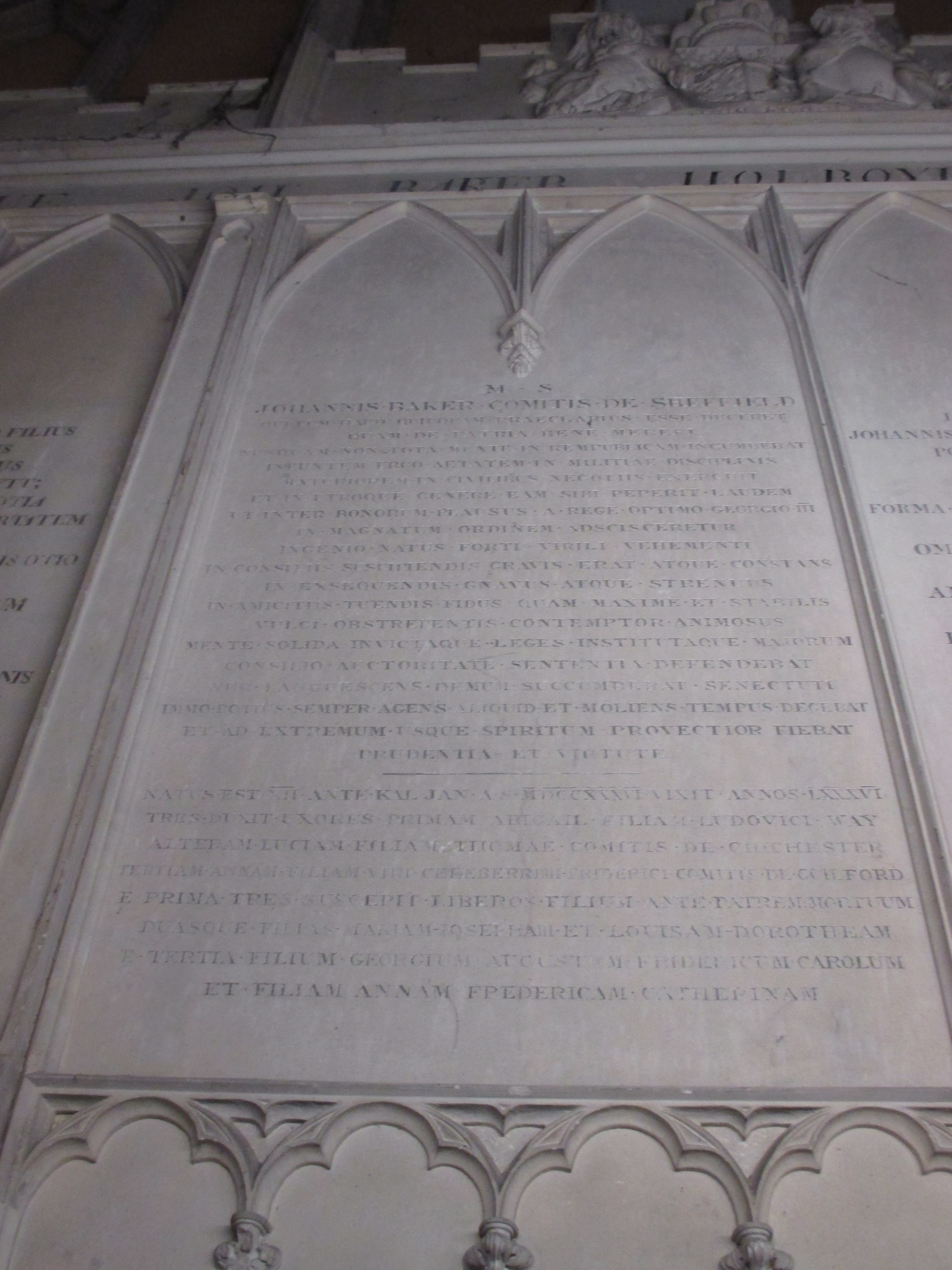
Holroyd's memorial tablet on the family mausoleum in Fletching parish church

In 1781 he was created a Peer of Ireland as Baron Sheffield, of Dunamore in the County of Meath, and in 1783 was further created Baron Sheffield, of Roscommon in the County of Roscommon, with a special remainder in favour of his daughters. As Irish peerages they did not interrupt his Parliamentary career and he was re-elected for Coventry in 1781 and for Bristol in 1790. His Parliamentary career did end however in 1802, when he was created a Peer of the United Kingdom as Baron Sheffield, of Sheffield in the County of York. In 1816, he was also created Viscount Pevensey and Earl of Sheffield in the Peerage of Ireland.

In 1783 he was elected a Fellow of the Royal Society.

He married Abigail Way, daughter of Lewis Way of Richmond, Surrey with whom he had a son and two daughters. Abigail died in 1793. In 1795 he married The Hon. Lucy Pelham (22 February 1763 – 18 January 1797), daughter of Thomas Pelham, 1st Earl of Chichester. His third marriage was to Lady Anne North (16 February 1760 – 18 January 1832), the daughter of the former Prime Minister Lord North on 20 January 1798.

Lord Sheffield died in 1821 and was buried in the Sheffield family mausoleum attached to the north transept of the Church of St Mary and St Andrew, Fletching, East Sussex. When Edward Gibbon died in 1794 while visiting Lord Sheffield, he too had been buried in the same mausoleum as a mark of respect. The Holroyd family are commemorated in the surrounding panels. The Earl's son and grandson succeeded in turn as second and third Earls of Sheffield, the latter being a well-known patron of cricket and on whose death the earldom became extinct.

Lord Sheffield's eldest daughter Maria Josepha married John Stanley, 1st Baron Stanley of Alderley on 11 October 1796, and therefore the Irish barony, under the special remainder, later passed to Edward Stanley, 4th Baron Stanley of Alderley, who thus became the fourth Baron Sheffield. Lord Sheffield's second daughter Dorothea Louisa married the army officer Sir William Clinton.

== Works and publications ==
In 1783, he wrote his opinions on the state of trade and commerce between Great Britain and its former subject America. The pamphlet Observations on the Commerce of the American States (Dublin, 1783), which ran six editions, made a comparative analysis of export and import calendar between two countries. It chronicled the amount of traded staple commodities during the prosperous year of 1773 and its disastrous year a decade later, the fluctuations in exports and imports during peacetime and war, and all the imports and exports to West Indies among many others. The Observations was written in opposition to the bill introduced by William Pitt in 1783, proposing to relax the navigation laws in favour of the United States. Pitt abandoned the proposal after it received considerable opposition. Edward Gibbon later said that in the Observations, "[t]he Navigation act, the Palladium of Britain, was defended, and perhaps saved, by his pen; and he proves, by the weight of fact and argument, that the mother-country may survive and flourish after the loss of America".

In 1790, he published Observations on the Project for Abolishing the Slave Trade, in which he took a conservative position on the debate over abolitionism, condemning the "inconsiderate and impracticable manner in which a great proportion of the community profess a disposition to relieve Negroes from slavery." Fearful of interfering with the right of enslavers to their human "property", he claimed that "nothing is more vain and empty than the idea that the British Legislature could immediately abolish slavery", and commended what he perceived as the "disposition shewn by the West-Indian assemblies to do everything that might be suggested for the advantage of the Negroes."

In Observations on the Manufactures, Trade, and Present State of Ireland (London, 1785), he also talked about the free trade and why Ireland and Great Britain should not proceed with its tariff war on their respective products like wool, woolens, cattle produce, fisheries, and variety of manufactures.

But in terms of agriculture, he maintained a more protectionist stance. He supported discussions on the agriculture to be of paramount importance as it tends to the true greatness and stability of a nation.

He opposed the kingdom's reliance on importation of corn, wheat, and other grains. He then published a series of pamphlet that tackles how the parliament should take care of its food production. On Observations on the Corn Bill (London, 1791), he advocated in higher yet stable price of corn, cultivate inferior land instead of using it for pasture, and emphasized that higher corn price is beneficial for manufactures.

He continued with Remarks on the Deficiency of the Grain; on the means of Present Relief, and of Future Plenty (London, 1800) where he expressed his displease on attacks against farmers on the suspicions that they are keeping the finest flour for themselves. He also asserted in his pamphlet that having rich farmers is of an utmost benefit to the society because they improve agriculture and keep the stocks of grain without too much stress to the public.

At a speech delivered in the House of Commons on 30 July 1801 he criticised the large sum they paid for importation of grain from foreign countries that arose from scarcity of grain and might result to creating a "dangerous policy of feeding the people at the public expense" (The Annual Biography and Obituary, Volume 6, 1822)

In 1803 he served as the President of the Board of Agriculture and, as a farmer himself, was considered as an authority in matters of land cultivation.

He also showed interest in maintaining the wool export. He published a volume on the topic of wool and woolen trading. First, he opposed restraining the exportation of the raw material in his Observations on the Objections made to the Exportation of Wool from Great Britain to Ireland in 1800. And in the next decade, he released a series of pamphlet from 1809 to 1812 On the Trade in Wool and Woollens where he noticed the weakening export to the American states. He then advocated for the importation of sheep from Spain to be bred. The same sentiments re-appeared after a decade in his Report at the Meeting at Lewes Wool Fair between 1818 and 1820.

His passion for local economy is also present in maritime industry. In his Strictures on the necessity of inviolably maintaining the Navigation and Colonial System of Great Britain (London, 1804), he pointed out that the suspension of Navigation Laws that rendered England as a free port injures every branch of the British marine. Opening up the port is deemed disadvantageous and discouraging to the seamen, shipbuilders and shipbuilding trade, and in contrary to the interest of their naval force.

Despite his opinions being heralded as abreast with time, his views sometimes were considered as short-sighted and insular (Dictionary of Political Economy Volume 3, Palgrave, p. 390). An example is his conservative stance on the abolition of slavery, where he commented on slave trade reformers that "not one of them had the candour to come forward and say, that those whose property was to be sacrificed in this pursuit should have any compensation whatever for their losses."

== Notes ==
Parliament of Great Britain
Preceded by Walter Waring; Edward Roe Yeo	Member of Parliament for Coventry; 1780; With: Edward Roe Yeo	Succeeded by Sir Thomas Hallifax; Thomas Rogers
Preceded by Sir Thomas Hallifax; Thomas Rogers	Member of Parliament for Coventry; 1781–1784; With: Edward Roe Yeo 1781–1783; William Seymour-Conway 1783–1784	Succeeded by Sampson Eardley; John Eardley Wilmot
Preceded by Matthew Brickdale; Henry Cruger	Member of Parliament for Bristol; 1790–1801; With: the Marquess of Worcester 1790–1796; Charles Bragge 1796–1801	Succeeded by Parliament of the United Kingdom
Parliament of the United Kingdom
Preceded by Parliament of Great Britain	Member of Parliament for Bristol; 1801–1802; With: Charles Bragge	Succeeded by Charles Bragge; Evan Baillie
Peerage of Ireland
New creation	Earl of Sheffield; 1816–1821	Succeeded by George Holroyd
New creation	Baron Sheffield; 1781–1821	Succeeded by George Holroyd
New creation	Baron Sheffield (with special remainder); 1783–1821	Succeeded by George Holroyd
Peerage of the United Kingdom
New creation	Baron Sheffield; 1802–1821	Succeeded by George Holroyd
