= Walter Waring (died 1780) =

British politician

Walter Waring (1726-1780), was a British politician who sat in the House of Commons between 1755 and 1780.

Waring was the son of Robert and Elizabeth Waring of Owlbury, Shropshire being baptised in December 1726 at Bishop's Castle. He was educated at Shrewsbury School and was admitted at St. John’s College, Cambridge on 8 April 1745, aged 18.

In 1755 Waring was returned as Member of Parliament for Bishops Castle through his residence at Owlbury. He is not known to have voted or made any speech during this Parliament. He married Hannah Ranby, daughter of John Ranby, serjeant surgeon to King George II on 18 July 1758. In 1759, he vacated his seat and arranged for Henry Grenville to take his place, in order, it seems, to raise money. Subsequently, his father in law encouraged him to stand at Bishops Castle again in 1763. Lord Clive offered to pay his expenses if he stood down as he was bound to lose, and in due course he did lose to Clive’s nephew.

In 1768 Waring unsuccessfully contested Coventry. He inherited the estate at Groton, Suffolk from his cousin Thomas Waring in 1769. The estate was considerable, and in 1773 he was returned unopposed as Member of Parliament for Coventry. He contested Coventry successfully in the 1774 British general election but appears to have made little or no contribution in parliament.

Waring died at the beginning of February 1780 and was buried at Groton.

== Sources ==
- Portrait of Hannah, Daughter of John Ranby Snr c.1748–50 by William Hogarth

Parliament of Great Britain
Preceded by John Dashwood-King; Barnaby Backwell	Member of Parliament for Bishops Castle; 1755–1759; With: John Dashwood-King	Succeeded by John Dashwood-King; Henry Grenville
Preceded by Hon. Henry Seymour-Conway; Sir Richard Glyn, Bt	Member of Parliament for Coventry; 1773–1780; With: Hon. Henry Seymour-Conway; Edward Roe Yeo	Succeeded by Edward Roe Yeo; John Baker Holroyd
