= List of listed buildings in Craig, Angus =

This is a list of listed buildings in the parish of Craig in Angus, Scotland.

== List ==
Name	Location	Date listed	Grid ref. (Note: Sometimes known as OSGB36, the grid reference (where provided) is based on the British national grid reference system used by the Ordnance Survey. • "Guide to National Grid". Ordnance Survey. • "Get-a-map". Ordnance Survey.)	Geo-coordinates	Notes	LB number (Note: Historic Environment Scotland assign a unique alphanumeric identifier to each designated site in Scotland, for listed buildings this always begins with "LB", for example "LB12345".)	Image
Fishtown Of Usan, Lookout Tower (2 Of 2)				56°40′55″N 2°27′11″W	Category C(S)	43894	Upload Photo
Inchbrayock House				56°41′47″N 2°27′43″W	Category B	4956	Upload Photo
Scotston Of Usan Farmhouse				56°41′05″N 2°28′00″W	Category C(S)	4968	Upload Photo
Dunninald Castle				56°40′45″N 2°29′08″W	Category A	4972	Upload another image See more images
Dunninald Mains Steading				56°40′45″N 2°28′53″W	Category B	4977	Upload Photo
Craig House - Stables				56°41′49″N 2°29′10″W	Category B	4986	Upload Photo
Craig House - Walled Gardens				56°41′50″N 2°29′13″W	Category B	4987	Upload Photo
7 Fishtown Of Usan, Former Farmhouse				56°40′57″N 2°27′09″W	Category C(S)	43895	Upload Photo
Dunninald Mains Farmhouse				56°40′45″N 2°28′55″W	Category B	4976	Upload Photo
Parish Kirk - Entrance Gates				56°41′33″N 2°29′08″W	Category B	4980	Upload Photo
Parish Kirk - Mausoleum				56°41′35″N 2°29′08″W	Category B	4981	Upload Photo
Ferryden Church (Of Scotland)				56°42′02″N 2°28′04″W	Category B	92	Upload another image
8-21 (Inclusive Nos) Fishtown Of Usan With Lookout Tower (1 Of 2)				56°40′56″N 2°27′07″W	Category C(S)	4963	Upload another image See more images
Dunninald Castle - Old Gatepiers				56°40′35″N 2°29′00″W	Category B	4973	Upload Photo
Dunninald Castle - North Lodge And Gates				56°41′00″N 2°29′14″W	Category B	4974	Upload another image
Craig House				56°41′49″N 2°29′13″W	Category A	4984	Upload Photo
Craigview House				56°41′37″N 2°29′03″W	Category B	4957	Upload Photo
Scurdie Ness Lighthouse (Montroseness Lighthouse)				56°42′06″N 2°26′14″W	Category B	4958	Upload another image See more images
Beacon, Scurdie Ness				56°42′07″N 2°26′46″W	Category B	4959	Upload another image
Usan House - Lodge				56°41′20″N 2°27′18″W	Category B	4966	Upload Photo
Usan House - Entrance Gates				56°41′20″N 2°27′18″W	Category B	4967	Upload Photo
Chapel Of St. Skae				56°40′35″N 2°27′59″W	Category B	4969	Upload Photo
Chapel Of St. Skae - Retaining Wall				56°40′36″N 2°28′00″W	Category B	4970	Upload Photo
Parish Kirk Manse				56°41′37″N 2°29′03″W	Category B	4982	Upload Photo
Craig Schoolhouse				56°41′33″N 2°29′05″W	Category B	4983	Upload Photo
Fishtown Of Usan, Pair Of Cottages				56°40′57″N 2°27′13″W	Category C(S)	43897	Upload Photo
Ferryden Tower And Steeple Of Old Infants School, Rossie Terrace				56°42′04″N 2°27′41″W	Category C(S)	5118	Upload Photo
Fishtown Of Usan, Old Icehouse				56°40′56″N 2°26′56″W	Category C(S)	4962	Upload Photo
Dunninald Castle - Stables				56°40′44″N 2°28′59″W	Category B	4975	Upload Photo
Balgove Farmhouse				56°41′42″N 2°29′28″W	Category B	4989	Upload Photo
Usan House				56°41′17″N 2°27′19″W	Category A	4964	Upload another image
Craig House - South Entrance Gatepiers				56°41′44″N 2°29′05″W	Category B	4988	Upload Photo
24 Fishtown Of Usan				56°40′57″N 2°26′59″W	Category C(S)	4961	Upload Photo
Usan House - Stables				56°41′19″N 2°27′16″W	Category B	4965	Upload Photo
East Mains Of Dysart Farmhouse				56°41′01″N 2°30′07″W	Category B	4978	Upload Photo
Fishtown Of Usan, Coastguard Station, Life-Saving Apparatus House				56°40′55″N 2°27′08″W	Category C(S)	43896	Upload Photo
Chapel Mill - Burial Ground				56°41′32″N 2°26′35″W	Category B	4960	Upload another image
Old Limekilns, Boddin Point				56°40′16″N 2°28′09″W	Category B	4971	Upload another image
Kirkton Of Craig, Kirk Tower House				56°41′34″N 2°29′07″W	Category A	4979	Upload another image See more images
Craig House - Entrance Gateway				56°41′48″N 2°29′10″W	Category A	4985	Upload Photo

== Key ==
The scheme for classifying buildings in Scotland is:

- Category A: "buildings of national or international importance, either architectural or historic; or fine, little-altered examples of some particular period, style or building type."
- Category B: "buildings of regional or more than local importance; or major examples of some particular period, style or building type, which may have been altered."
- Category C: "buildings of local importance; lesser examples of any period, style, or building type, as originally constructed or moderately altered; and simple traditional buildings which group well with other listed buildings."

In March 2016 there were 47,288 listed buildings in Scotland. Of these, 8% were Category A, and 50% were Category B, with the remaining 42% being Category C.

== See also ==
- List of listed buildings in Angus
