= Thomas Hallifax =

English banker, Lord Mayor of London and Member of Parliament

Sir Thomas Hallifax (23 February 1722 – 7 February 1789), of Gordon House, Enfield, Middlesex, was an English banker, Lord Mayor of London and Member of Parliament.

He was born the younger son of a Barnsley clockmaker and moved to London, where he found work as a bank clerk. He rose to be chief clerk before leaving to found a bank of his own, Vere, Glyn & Hallifax Bank, with fellow banker Joseph Vere and merchant Richard Glyn, which later became Glyn, Mills & Co. He was made an alderman of London in 1766 and elected Lord Mayor of London for 1776–77. He was knighted on 5 February 1773.

He was briefly a Member (MP) of the Parliament of Great Britain for Coventry from December 1780 to February 1781 before being unseated on petition but then returned unopposed for Aylesbury to sit from 1784 to 1789.

He died in 1789, leaving a fortune estimated at £100,000. He had married twice, firstly Penelope, the daughter of Richard Thomson of Ewell, Surrey and secondly Margaret, the daughter and coheiress of wealthy merchant John Saville of Enfield, Middlesex. He had two sons, Thomas and Savile, by his second wife, of whom Thomas became a partner in the bank.

Parliament of Great Britain
Vacant Title last held by Edward Roe Yeo; John Baker Holroyd	Member of Parliament for Coventry; 1780–1781; With: Thomas Rogers	Succeeded by Edward Roe Yeo; The Lord Sheffield
Preceded by Anthony Bacon; Thomas Orde	Member of Parliament for Aylesbury; 1784–1789; With: William Wrightson	Succeeded by William Wrightson; Scrope Bernard
