= James Stansfeld =

British Radical and Liberal politician and social reformer (1820–1898)

The Right Honourable Sir James Stansfeld GCB
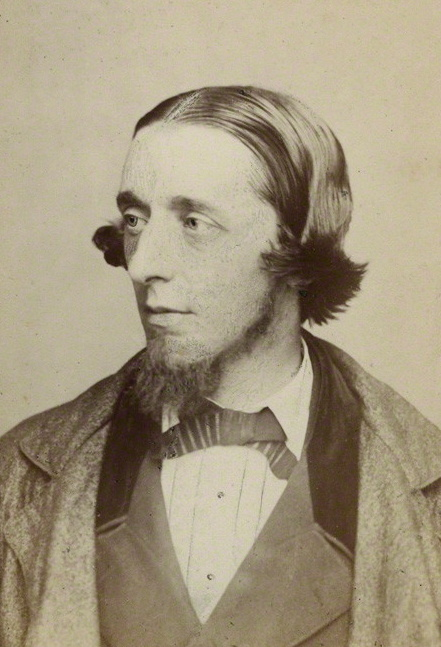

President of the Local Government Board
- In office 3 April 1886 – 20 July 1886
- Monarch: Victoria
- Prime Minister: William Ewart Gladstone
- Preceded by: Joseph Chamberlain
- Succeeded by: Charles Ritchie
- In office 19 August 1871 – 17 February 1874
- Preceded by: Office created
- Succeeded by: George Sclater-Booth

President of the Poor Law Board
- In office 17 March 1871 – 19 August 1871
- Preceded by: George Goschen
- Succeeded by: Office abolished

Financial Secretary to the Treasury
- In office 2 November 1869 – 17 March 1871
- Preceded by: Acton Smee Ayrton
- Succeeded by: William Edward Baxter

Under-Secretary of State for India
- In office February 1866 – July 1866
- Prime Minister: The Earl Russell; The Earl of Derby
- Preceded by: The Lord Dufferin and Clandeboye
- Succeeded by: Sir James Fergusson, Bt

Civil Lord of the Admiralty
- In office May 1863 – April 1864
- Prime Minister: The Viscount Palmerston
- Preceded by: The Marquess of Hartington
- Succeeded by: Hugh Childers
Parliamentary offices
Member of Parliament for Halifax
In office 1859–1895 Serving with: Sir Charles Wood, Bt; Edward Akroyd; John Crossley; John Dyson Hutchinson; Thomas Shaw; William Rawson Shaw
Preceded by	Sir Francis Crossley, Bt; Sir Charles Wood, Bt
Succeeded by	William Rawson Shaw; Sir Alfred Arnold

Personal details
- Born: 5 March 1820 Halifax, Yorkshire
- Died: 17 February 1898 (aged 77) Rotherfield, Sussex
- Party: Radical; Liberal
- Spouse: Caroline Ashurst (m. 1844; died 1885)
- Parent(s): James Stansfeld; Emma Ralph
- Relatives: William Crompton-Stansfield; Hamer Stansfeld; James Rawdon Stansfeld; Thomas Wolryche Stansfeld; John R. E. Stansfeld
- Education: University College, London; Middle Temple

Sir James Stansfeld, GCB (/ˈstænsfiːld/ STANSS-feeld; 5 March 1820 – 17 February 1898) was a British Radical and Liberal politician and social reformer who served as Under-Secretary of State for India (1866), Financial Secretary to the Treasury (1869–71) and President of the Poor Law Board (1871) before being appointed the first President of the Local Government Board (1871–74 and 1886).

== Background ==
Stansfeld was born at Akeds Road, Halifax, the only son of James Stansfeld Sr (1792–1872) and his wife Emma Ralph (1793–1851), daughter of John Ralph (d.1795), minister of the Northgate-End Unitarian chapel, Halifax and his wife, Dorothy (1754–1824).

Stansfeld's father, James Sr, was the sixth son of David Stansfield (1755–1818) of Hope Hall, Halifax, and his wife Sarah Wolrich (1757–1824), daughter of Thomas Wolrich (1719–91) of Armley House, Leeds. He was a descendant of the Stansfeld family of Stansfield and Sowerby, Yorkshire, a nephew of the Liberal Mayor of Leeds, Hamer Stansfeld, and a distant cousin of the politician William Crompton-Stansfield and the soldiers James Rawdon Stansfeld, Thomas Wolryche Stansfeld and John R. E. Stansfeld.

James Sr was originally a member of a firm of solicitors, Stansfeld & Craven, and subsequently served as a county court judge in the Halifax district; he was the last solicitor on the bench in a century. James Stansfeld Jr's sister, Mary (d.1885), married the Liberal MP George Dixon.

== Education ==
Brought up as a nonconformist, Stansfeld was in 1837 sent to University College, London, and graduated BA in 1840 and LLB in 1844. He was admitted a student of the Middle Temple on 31 October 1840, and was called to the bar on 26 January 1849; he does not seem, however, to have practised as a barrister, and later in life derived his income mainly from a brewery at Fulham.

On 27 July 1844, Stansfeld married Caroline, second daughter of William Henry Ashurst, a radical and friend of Giuseppe Mazzini, to whom Stansfeld was introduced in 1847: they became close. Stansfeld also sympathised with the Chartist movement, even if Feargus O'Connor denounced him. He took an active part in propagating radical opinions in the north of England, frequently spoke at meetings of the Northern Reform Union, and was one of the promoters of the association for the repeal of "taxes on knowledge".

== Political career ==
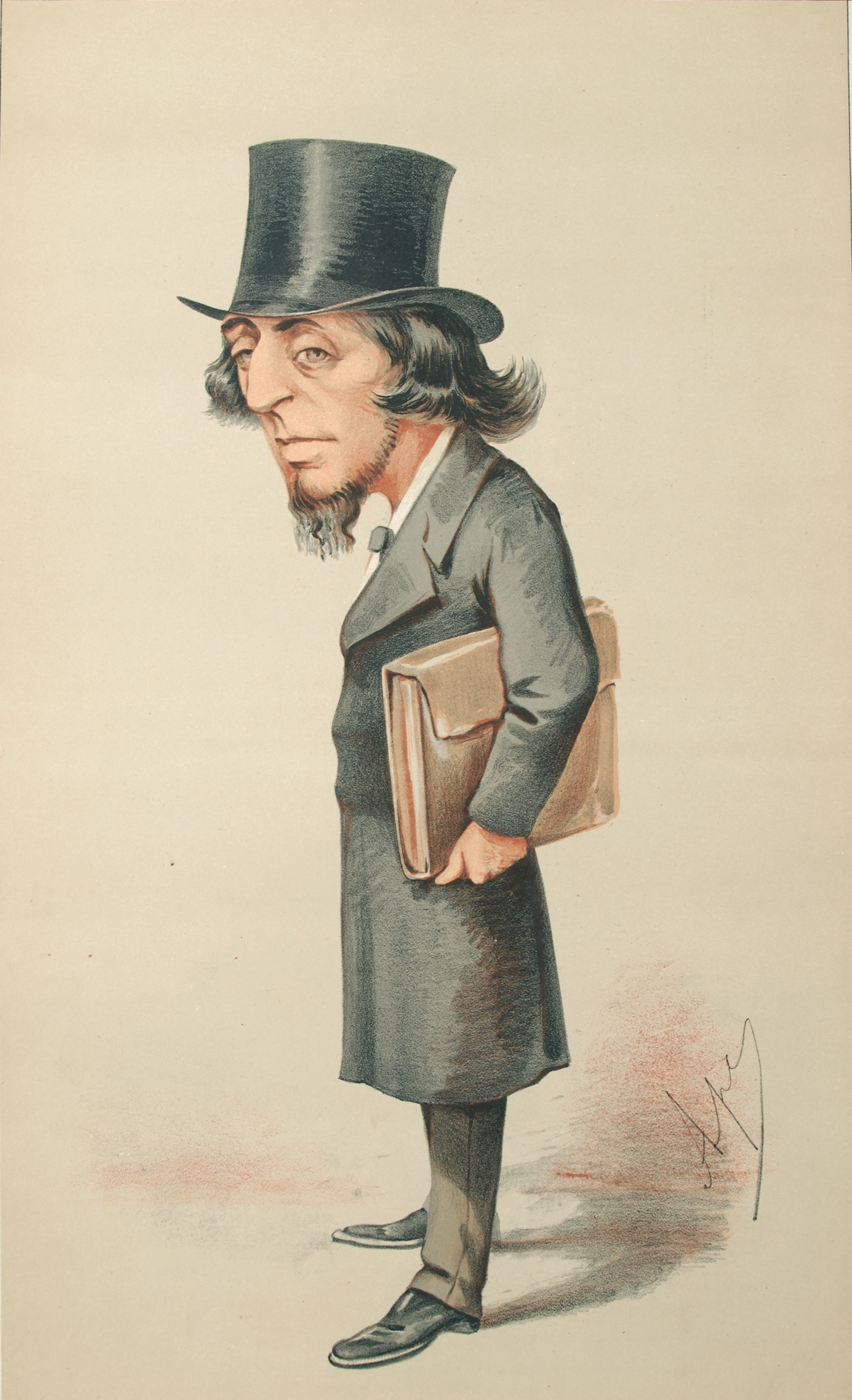
"Pour encourager les autres": Caricature of The Rt Hon. James Stansfeld, Vanity Fair, 10 April 1869

In 1859, Stansfeld was returned to Parliament as a Radical member for Halifax, which he continued to represent for over thirty-six years. He voted consistently on the Radical side, but his chief energies were devoted to promoting the cause of Italian unity. He was selected by Giuseppe Garibaldi as his adviser when the Italian patriot visited England in 1862. In 1863, he moved in the House of Commons a resolution of sympathy with the Poles.

Stansfeld became Civil Lord of the Admiralty in April 1863. In 1864, as the result of charges made against him by the French authorities, in connection with Greco's conspiracy against Napoleon III, Disraeli, in the House of Commons, accused him of "being in correspondence with the assassins of Europe." Stansfeld was vigorously defended by John Bright and William Edward Forster, and his explanation was accepted as quite satisfactory by Palmerston. Nevertheless, he only escaped a vote of censure by ten votes, and accordingly resigned office in April 1864.

In 1865, he was re-elected for Halifax, and became the seventh Under-Secretary of State for India in February 1866 (until July) under Lord Russell. He served in William Ewart Gladstone's first administration (1868)–74) as a third Lord of the Treasury between December 1868 and November 1869, as Financial Secretary to the Treasury between 2 November 1869 and 17 March 1871, and as the twelfth and last President of the Poor Law Board (with a seat in the cabinet) from March to August 1871, before being appointed the first President of the Local Government Board, on 19 August 1871, a post he held until the Liberals lost power in February 1874. He was sworn of the Privy Council in February 1869.

The remainder of his life was mainly spent in endeavouring to secure the repeal of the Contagious Diseases Acts, and in 1886 this objective was attained. He did not serve in Gladstone's second administration (1880–85), and declined the twice-repeated offer of the Deputy Speakership. He later returned to government in Gladstone's third administration on 3 April 1886, when he again became President of the Local Government Board. However, the government fell in July of the same year. Stansfeld did not serve in Gladstone's last administration (1892-95) and refused a peerage. However, before Lord Rosebery left office in June 1895, Stansfeld was appointed Knight Grand Cross of the Order of the Bath in the 1895 Birthday Honours. He retired as MP for Halifax in the same month.

== Personal life ==
Stansfeld married Caroline, second daughter of William Henry Ashurst, on 27 July 1844. Their son was the barrister-at-law Joseph James Stansfeld (b. 1852). After his wife's death, on 22 June 1887, Stansfeld married his second wife, Frances, widow of Henry Augustus Severn of Sydney.

Stansfeld died, aged 77, at his residence, Castle Hill, Rotherfield, Sussex, on 17 February 1898, and was buried at Rotherfield on 22 February 1898.

== Ancestry ==
Ancestors of Sir James Stansfeld

16. Eli Stansfield of Sowerby, Yorkshire
8. David Stansfield of Hope Hall, Halifax, Yorkshire
17. Mary Farrer
4. David Stansfield of Leeds, Yorkshire
18. Rev. Timothy Aldred
9. Ellen Aldred
2. James Stansfeld of Halifax, Yorkshire
20. Toby Wolrich of Armley House, Leeds, Yorkshire
10. Thomas Wolrich of Armley House, Leeds, Yorkshire
21. Penelope Hatton
5. Sarah Wolrich
22. Samuel Hamer of Hamer, Rochdale, Lancashire
11. Margaret Hamer
23. Mary Ibbetson
1. Sir James Stansfeld
6. John Ralph of Halifax, Yorkshire
3. Emma Ralph
7. Dorothy

== See also ==
- Hamer Stansfeld
- William Crompton-Stansfield
- Field House, Sowerby
- Dunninald Castle

Parliament of the United Kingdom
Preceded by Sir Francis Crossley, Bt; Sir Charles Wood, Bt	Member of Parliament for Halifax; 1859–1895; With: Sir Charles Wood, Bt 1859–1865; Edward Akroyd 1865–1874; John Crossley 1874–1877; John Dyson Hutchinson 1877–1882; Thomas Shaw 1882–1893; William Rawson Shaw 1893–1895	Succeeded by William Rawson Shaw; Sir Alfred Arnold
Political offices
Preceded by The Marquess of Hartington	Civil Lord of the Admiralty; 1863 – 1864	Succeeded by Hugh Childers
Preceded by The Lord Dufferin and Clandeboye	Under-Secretary of State for India; February – July 1866	Succeeded by Sir James Fergusson, Bt
Preceded by Acton Smee Ayrton	Financial Secretary to the Treasury; 1869 – 1871	Succeeded by William Edward Baxter
Preceded by George Goschen	President of the Poor Law Board; March – August 1871	Succeeded by Office abolished
Preceded by New office	President of the Local Government Board; 1871 – 1874	Succeeded by George Sclater-Booth
Preceded by Joseph Chamberlain	President of the Local Government Board; April – July 1886	Succeeded by Charles Ritchie
