= William Crompton-Stansfield =

British landowner and Whig politician (1790–1871)

William Rookes Crompton-Stansfield DL

Member of Parliament for Huddersfield
- In office 29 July 1837 – 15 March 1853
- Preceded by: Edward Ellice
- Succeeded by: George Robinson

Personal details
- Born: William Rookes Crompton; 3 August 1790 Yorkshire
- Died: 5 December 1871 (aged 81) Frimley Park, Surrey
- Party: Whig
- Spouse: Emma Markham (m. 1824)
- Relatives: Sir Samuel Crompton; Sir James Stansfeld; Hamer Stansfeld; James Rawdon Stansfeld; Thomas Wolryche Stansfeld; John R. E. Stansfeld
- Education: Harrow School
- Alma mater: University of Cambridge

William Rookes Crompton-Stansfield DL (3 August 1790 – 5 December 1871) of Esholt Hall, Yorkshire, and Frimley Park, Surrey, was a British landowner and Whig politician who was MP for Huddersfield, Yorkshire, from 1837 to 1853.

== Background ==
Crompton was born on 3 August 1790. He was the second (but eldest surviving) son of Joshua Crompton (1754–1832) and his wife Anna Maria Rookes (1762–1819), daughter of William Rookes (1719–89) of Royds Hall, Bradford, Yorkshire. His father, Joshua, was the son of Samuel Crompton (1714–82), a descendant of the Derby banking family of Crompton, and a cousin of the politician Sir Samuel Crompton. William's elder brother, Stansfield Crompton (1788–1801), died at the age of 13 and was buried at Guiseley Parish Church.

Crompton's mother, Anna Maria, was the daughter of William Rookes and Annie Stansfield (1729–98). Annie was the daughter of Robert Stansfield (b.1676) of Bradford, Yorkshire, sister of Robert Stansfield (1727–72) who purchased Esholt Hall in 1755, and a descendant of the Stansfeld family of Stansfield and Sowerby, Yorkshire (and also a cousin of the politicians Sir James Stansfeld, Hamer Stansfeld, and the soldiers James Rawdon Stansfeld, Thomas Wolryche Stansfeld and John R. E. Stansfeld). In 1832, Crompton assumed the additional surname and arms of Stansfield on inheriting Esholt Hall, near Bradford, Yorkshire, and other estates from his mother.

== Career ==
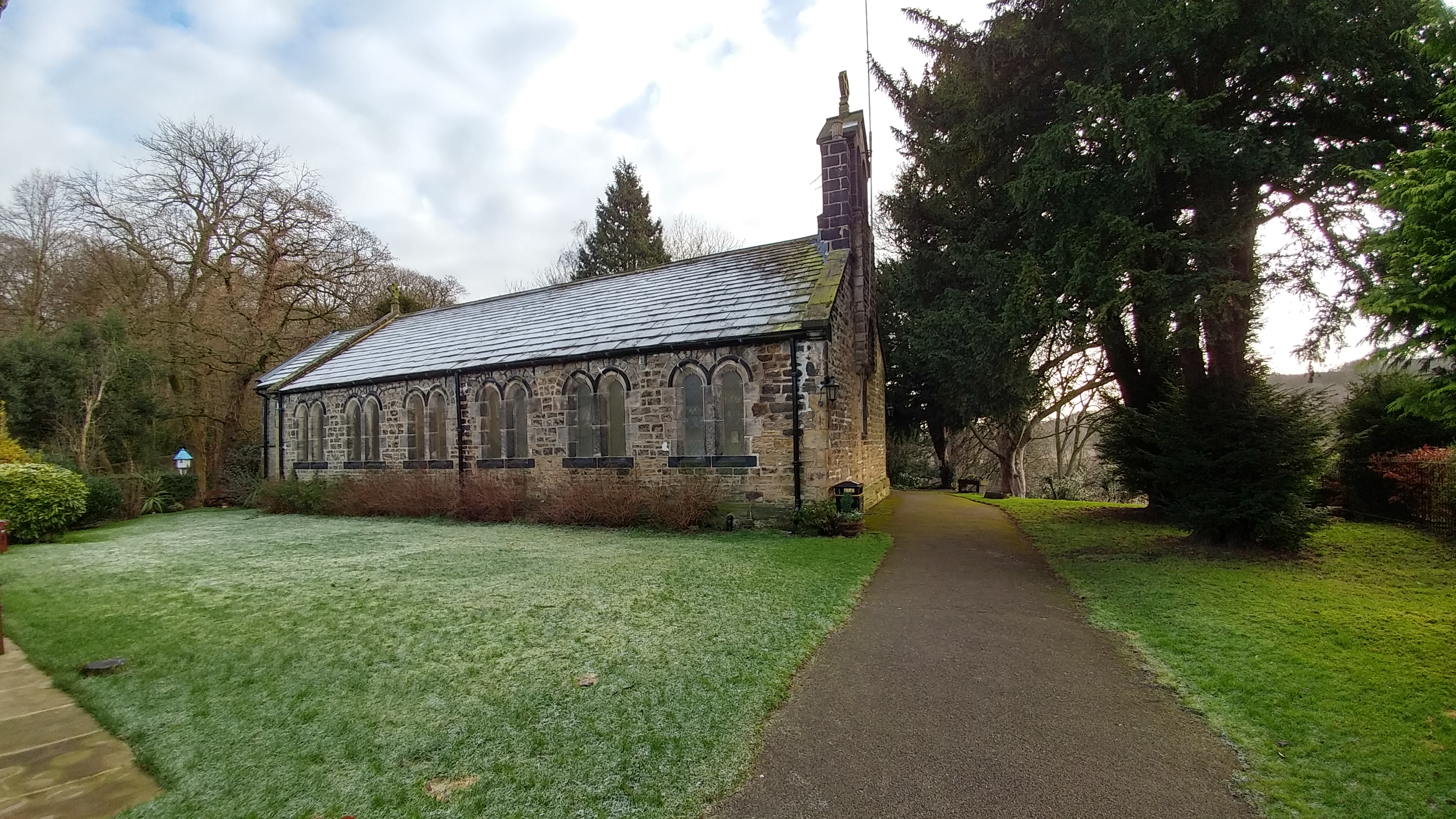
St Paul's Church, Esholt, built by William Crompton-Stansfield in 1839

Crompton was educated at Harrow School. He matriculated at Jesus College, Cambridge in 1808, graduating B.A. in 1813, M.A. in 1816. He was admitted to Lincoln's Inn in 1814, and was called to the bar in 1819.

Crompton was elected Whig MP for Huddersfield at the 1837 general election and held the seat until 1853. In 1839, he built St Paul's Church as a private family chapel at the cost of £800 (since 1983 it has been used in the combined parish of Guiseley with Esholt).

He opposed the intrusion of the Leeds and Bradford Railway as it crossed his Esholt estate in 1846 and again in 1860 when it the Otley and Ilkley Joint Railway line was proposed, but the line was eventually built by the Midland Railway Company. Consequently, he later preferred to live at Frimley Park, Surrey.

Crompton-Stansfield's win at the 1852 general election was declared void due to bribery and treating which "prevailed to a great extent". It was found, by a Commons Committee, that he was "by his agents, guilty of bribery and treating at the last Election". The Committee discovered that "treating throughout the said Borough during the last Election was general, systematic, and extravagant in its character": between sixty and seventy public-houses (at least) had been opened by his agents, with refreshments provided apparently without limit and paid for without inquiry (with expenses incurred on that account alone amounting to upwards of £1,000). With one exception, however, the only persons who were furnished with orders to provide refreshments were registered Electors, so it was not proved to the Committee that the bribery or treating were committed with Crompton-Stansfield's knowledge and consent. Nevertheless, the Committee considered that a system of treating (like that which appears to have prevailed for some time in Huddersfield) must have had the effect of exercising an influence over the minds of voters "as corrupting and debasing as direct bribery". He was later a Deputy Lieutenant of the West Riding of Yorkshire.

== Family ==
Crompton married, on 17 June 1824, Emma Markham, daughter of William Markham of Becca Hall, Yorkshire, and granddaughter of William Markham (1719–1807), Archbishop of York. She was the niece of Frederica, Countess of Mansfield (1774–1860) and a cousin of William Murray, 4th Earl of Mansfield (1806–98).

Crompton-Stansfield died, aged 81, at Frimley Park, Surrey, on 5 December 1871. There were no children from the marriage and Esholt Hall was inherited by his nephew, General William Henry Crompton-Stansfield (1835–88).

== Ancestry ==
Ancestors of William Rookes Crompton-Stansfield

16. Abraham Crompton of Derby
8. Samuel Crompton of Derby
17. Elizabeth Bourne
4. Samuel Crompton of Derby
18. William Rodes
9. Ann Rodes
2. Joshua Crompton
20. Timothy Fox
10. Samuel Fox
21. Frances Richardson
5. Elizabeth Fox
11. Elizabeth Wadstaff
1. William Rookes Crompton-Stansfield
6. William Rookes of Royds Hall, Bradford, Yorkshire
3. Anna Maria Rookes
28. Samuel Stansfield of Bradford, Yorkshire
14. Robert Stansfield of Bradford, Yorkshire
29. Mary Clarkson
7. Annie Stansfield
30. William Busfeild of Rishworth Hall, Yorkshire
15. Anna Busfeild

== See also ==
- Sir James Stansfeld
- Hamer Stansfeld
- Field House, Sowerby
- Dunninald Castle

Parliament of the United Kingdom
Preceded by Edward Ellice	Member of Parliament for Huddersfield; 1837–1853	Succeeded by George Robinson
