= Rawdon =

Rawdon may refer to:

== Places ==
in England

- Rawdon, West Yorkshire
- Rawdon Colliery, Leicestershire

in Canada

- Rawdon, Quebec
- Rawdon, Ontario, a historic township merged since 1997 into the municipality of Stirling-Rawdon, Ontario
- Rawdon Township, Nova Scotia, a historic township merged since 1861 into the Municipal District of East Hants

== People ==
- The Rawdon Baronets of Moira, County Down, also Baron Rawdon and Earl Rawdon or Earl of Rawdon, as titles in the lineage of the Marquess of Hastings
  - Francis Rawdon-Hastings, 1st Marquess of Hastings (1754-1826), Anglo-Irish politician and military officer
  - John Rawdon, 1st Earl of Moira (1720-1793), Irish peer
- James Rawdon Stansfeld (1866–1936), British army officer

=== Fictional characters ===
- Col. Rawdon Crawley and his son and namesake Sir Rawdon Crawley, characters in the 1848 novel Vanity Fair by William Makepeace Thackeray
