= John Raymond Evelyn Stansfeld =

British army officer (1880–1915)

Lieutenant-colonel John Raymond Evelyn Stansfeld DSO
- Born: 20 April 1880
- Died: 28 September 1915 (aged 35)
- Occupation: Soldier
- Spouse: Constance Yolande de Bourbel de Montpincon
- Relatives: William Crompton-Stansfield; Hamer Stansfeld; Sir James Stansfeld; James Rawdon Stansfeld; Thomas Wolryche Stansfeld
- Military career
- Allegiance: United Kingdom
- Branch: British Army
- Service years: 1899–1915
- Rank: 2nd lieutenant (1899); Lieutenant (1900); Captain (1904); Major (1915); Lieutenant-colonel (1915)
- Unit: 2nd Gordon Highlanders

John Raymond Evelyn Stansfeld DSO (/ˈɛvəlɪn ˈstænsfiːld/ EV-əl-in STANSS-feeld; 20 April 1880 – 28 September 1915) was a British army officer involved in the Relief of Ladysmith, the Battle of Spion Kop during the Boer War and the First Battle of Ypres. Stansfeld died at the Battle of Loos during World War I. He served with the Gordon Highlanders.

== Early life ==
Stansfeld was born on 20 April 1880. He was the youngest child and only son of John Birkbeck Evelyn Stansfeld (1846–1911), Rector of Preston, and his wife Marie Agnes Barrenger. John Snr was the son of Rev. John Stansfield (1814–61), Vicar of Coniston Cold. His cousin, was John Stansfeld (1840–1928) of Field House, Sowerby, and Dunninald Castle, Montrose. He was a descendant of the Stansfeld family of Stansfield and Sowerby, Yorkshire, and a distant cousin of William Crompton-Stansfield, Sir James Stansfeld, Hamer Stansfeld, James Rawdon Stansfeld and Thomas Wolryche Stansfeld.

Stansfeld was educated at Uppingham School where in 1896 he was awarded the school's Silver Medal for winning the annual boxing competition; the school magazine described him as an "all round athlete of the highest possible promise".

== Military career ==
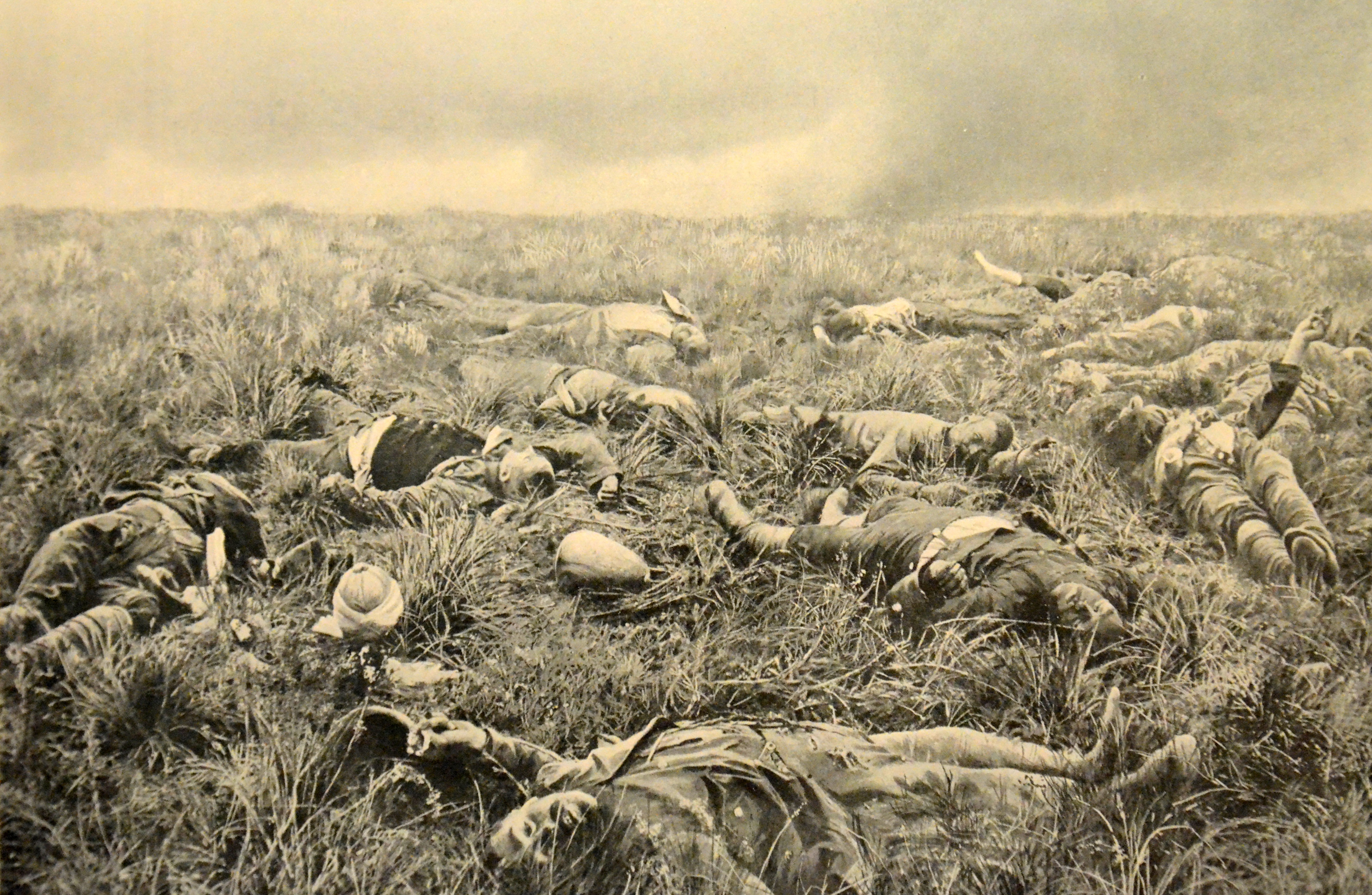
The aftermath of the Battle of Spion Kop.

Stansfeld entered the Royal Military College, Sandhurst, after successfully passing the infantry competitive examination in 1898. At Sandhurst he won the heavyweight boxing championship and captained the football team; he passed out in June 1899 having been awarded the Sword of Honour. Four months later he was gazetted into the 2nd Battalion, Gordon Highlanders as a second lieutenant, succeeding Maury Meiklejohn. He received orders to immediately join the battalion, then fighting in the Second Boer War in South Africa who were then at the front in Natal.

He served in the war in South Africa (1899–1902), and was present at the Relief of Ladysmith, Colneso, Tugela Heights, and the Battle of Spion Kop (January 1900). At Spion Kop, he helped wounded soldiers while under fire, for which he was appointed a Companion of the Distinguished Service Order (DSO) in 1900. He was promoted to lieutenant on 25 February 1900. For his service during the war, he was twice mentioned in despatches (1901). and received the Queen's medal with six clasps and the King's medal with two clasps. Stansfeld, promoted to captain, dated 30 May 1904, later served in India and Egypt (1910–14), at Sialkot, Peshawar, Calcutta and Cawnpore, and participated in the Delhi Durbar (1911), and was made an adjutant in January 1912, before returning to Europe in 1914.

He was mentioned in dispatches three times during the Boer War.

=== First World War ===
Stansfeld with Bavarian and Hanoverian troops during the Christmas truce. He is in the centre of the rear row – the tallest figure.

He returned from Egypt to the early fighting in Belgium and was wounded during the First Battle of Ypres. He returned to the front after three weeks' leave, and was again mentioned in dispatches. He participated in the famous Christmas truce at the end of the first year of the Great War and wrote home to his wife about it,

This letter will reach you about New Year's Day. I must describe my Xmas day to you, which was most unique, and very interesting. Sprot and I were alone, we went to Communion Service at 8am in a hay-loft! There were about 40 people, mostly officers. The General, and all his staff, and a lot of gunners were there. Most of the officers of course were in the trenches. We returned to breakfast, and had the Xmas tree on the table, and with that coffee, quaker oats and eggs and bacon, and ration jam (a curious mixture of tea-leaves and turnips). We thoroughly enjoyed ourselves.
...
When Sprot and I arrived (about 3pm) there was no-one in the ... of our section, so I waved for one of the Germans to come across and talk, which he did. We met in the middle but beyond shaking hands and laughing at one another, we could not say very much as we were both ignorant of the other's language. Henry (big drummer) who is my orderly with Piper Stuart was with us and I had carefully left my camera in our trenches in case of raising suspicion, but as my friend seemed quite willing to be photographed, I sent Henry for it. Meanwhile in order to collect a few men for the group, I gave couple of View Halloos. Effect marvellous. Heads popped up everywhere. They thought we were charging them, I think!! When they saw what was happening, about 20 came across.

I took 2 photos with Sprot in the group, and he took 2 with me in the group. It should be most interesting and quite unique. I should get into awful trouble if it was known, as we are not allowed to take photos. But what a chance to have missed. They were Bavarians and Hanoverians, 15th, 115th and 158th Regiments. They were very cheery and laughed at nothing, in fact merriment was rather forced on both sides. However, we ragged one another. There was one measly looking officer, who looked as if he played a tin whistle in civil life. One man made a horrible face and slunk off like a frightened wolf – and started to run to his trench. I honestly thought he was going to get his gun and shoot me. So Sprot and I walked quietly back to our trench, ready to jump in, if there was any trouble. Presently he came back with four pals and shouted to me to go back and photograph them as well! I did not go back. As the Boer prisoner said to me at Jopa "he looked me false in ze face".

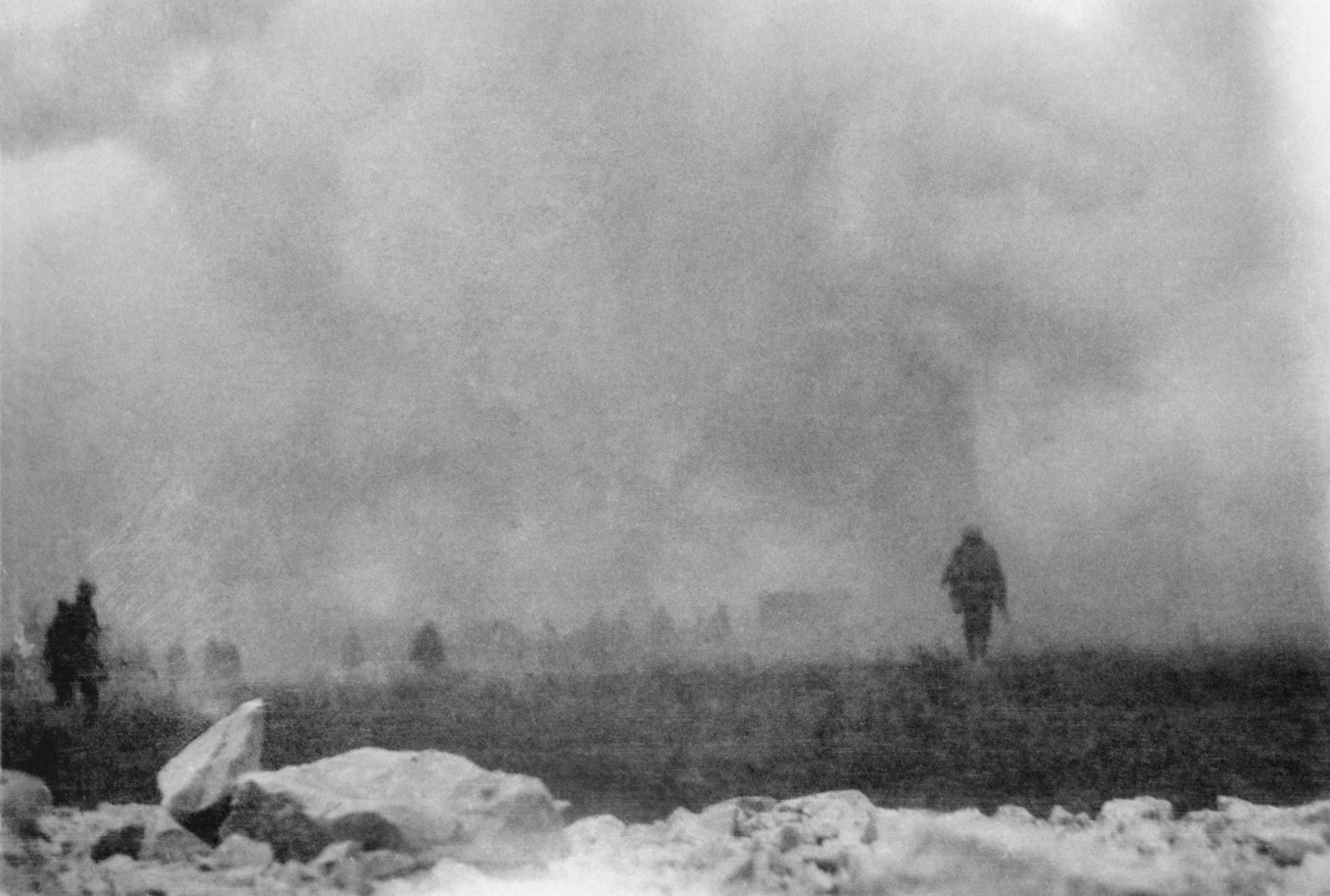
British infantry advancing through gas at Loos, 25 September 1915.

He was mentioned in dispatches twice.

He was promoted to brevet major in February 1915 and temporary lieutenant colonel in August, backdated to June.

In March 1915 at the Battle of Neuve Chapelle, Stansfeld was wounded for a second time, receiving a shrapnel wound to his shoulder. He was hospitalised at Warley, Essex then spent some time recuperating with his uncle at Dunninald. He was soon back at the front commanding the 2nd Gordons at the Battle of Loos. Within minutes of the start of the battle on 25 September Stansfeld was wounded in both legs; he was stretchered away and his right leg amputated. He died of his wounds three days later on 28 September at a field dressing station in Chocques. Lieutenant-colonel Stansfeld was one of 54 British Empire commanding officers killed or wounded at that battle.

== Memorial and burial ==
As reported in the Craven Herald Article Date: 22 October 1915, a memorial service was held in October at St. Mary's Church, Montrose, Angus (presumably the antecedent of the present Saints Mary and Peter). Walter Robberds, The Most Reverend the Primus of the Scottish Episcopal Church and Bishop of Brechin officiated. A regimental contingent was present, including officers and wounded enlisted men. The "choral celebration of the Holy Communion ... [hymns] included 'Onward, Christian Soldiers,' 'Come, Holy Ghost, our souls inspire,' and 'For all the Saints,' ... [and] the tenor solo in the Benedictus, 'Blessed is He that cometh,' to organ accompaniment." After a eulogy, the service concluded with the organ and orchestra playing Chopin's Funeral March, singing of God Save the King (the National Anthem), and cornets intoning The Last Post.

Lieutenant-colonel Stansfield is buried at the Chocques Military Cemetery in France.

He is honored in The Royal Memorial Chapel, Chapel Square, Royal Military Academy, Sandhurst. So too, on a plaque installed at Craig Parish Church.

== Family ==
In 1904, Stansfeld married Constance Yolonde de Bourbel de Montpincon the daughter of Major-general Raoul de Bourbel, 8th Marquis de Montpincon (1830–1904). They had one son, Captain John de Bourbel Stansfeld, MC (1905–57) of Dunninald Castle, Scotland.
