= Thomas Wolryche Stansfeld =

British army officer (1877–1935)

Brigadier-General Thomas Wolryche Stansfeld CMG DSO
- Born: 30 June 1877; Leeds, Yorkshire
- Died: 22 February 1935 (aged 57); Hythe, Kent
- Spouse: Ethel Hebden
- Children: 2
- Relatives: William Crompton-Stansfield; Sir James Stansfeld; Hamer Stansfeld; James Rawdon Stansfeld; John R. E. Stansfeld
- Military career
- Allegiance: United Kingdom
- Branch: British Army
- Service years: 1897–1929
- Rank: Brigadier-General
- Awards: Order of St Michael and St George; Distinguished Service Order; Mention in Despatches (4); Legion of Honour (France); Croix de Guerre (France)

Brigadier-General Thomas Wolryche Stansfeld CMG DSO (English: /ˈwʊlrɪtʃ ˈstænsfiːld/ WUUL-ritch STANSS-feeld; 30 June 1877 – 22 February 1935) was a British Army officer who served in the Boer War (1899–1902) and World War I, seeing action at the First Battle of Ypres and Battle of Passchendaele and other battles.

== Early life ==
Stansfeld was born in Leeds on 30 June 1877, the youngest son of Thomas Wolryche Stansfeld (1822–1885), JP, of Weetwood Grange, Leeds. His mother was his father's second wife Louisa Agnes Chapman, second daughter of Joseph Barker Chapman and granddaughter of Aaron Chapman.

== Military career ==
Stansfeld was educated at Winchester School, before entering the army in 1897. He served in the Boer War in South Africa (1899–1902) during which he was involved in operations near Colesberg and the Relief of Kimberley and also saw action at the Battle of Paardeberg and was mentioned in dispatches. He was appointed a Companion of the Distinguished Service Order (DSO) in 1900 and promoted to captain in 1902.

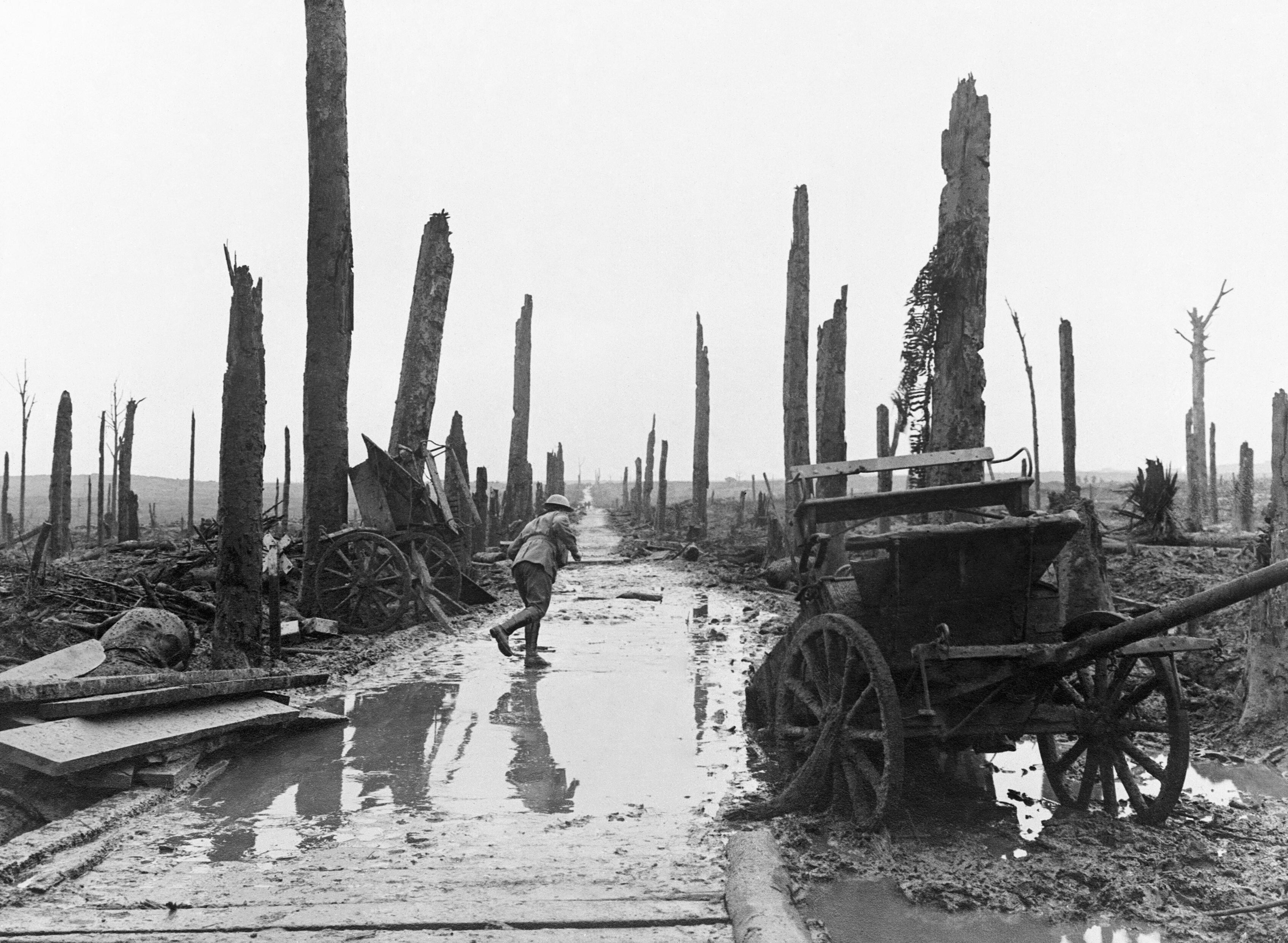
A soldier at Chateau Wood, Passchendaele

Stansfeld served during World War I, at the First Battle of Ypres, after which he was wounded. He was promoted to the rank of major in 1914. During 1915, he saw action at the battles of Festubert, Givenchy, and Hulloch, and was mentioned in dispatches. In 1917, he was at the battles of Passchendaele and Cambrai, was twice mentioned in dispatches and awarded the French Legion of Honour and Croix de Guerre and promoted to Brigadier-General. During 1918, he was at Bullecourt, Mount Kemmell, Mercatel and was again mentioned in dispatches. He was appointed a Commander of the Order of St Michael and St George (CMG) in the 1918 New Year Honours. Stansfeld was promoted to colonel in 1919.

After the war, he was the commandant at the Small Arms School, Hythe, and Commander of the 137th Staffordshire Infantry Brigade (1924–25) and the 10th Infantry Brigade (1925–29). Stansfeld retired in 1929 and died at Hythe, Kent, on 22 February 1935.

== Family ==
Stansfeld married, in 1903, Ethel, daughter of William Hebden of Scarborough, Yorkshire, and they had two sons. One of these was Lieutenant-Colonel Thomas Wolrych Guy Stansfeld, DSO (1906–87) who served in the East Surrey Regiment during World War II.

Military offices
Preceded by New post	Commandant of the Small Arms School; 1921–1923	Succeeded by Alan John Hunter
