= Frimley Park =

English house and gardens

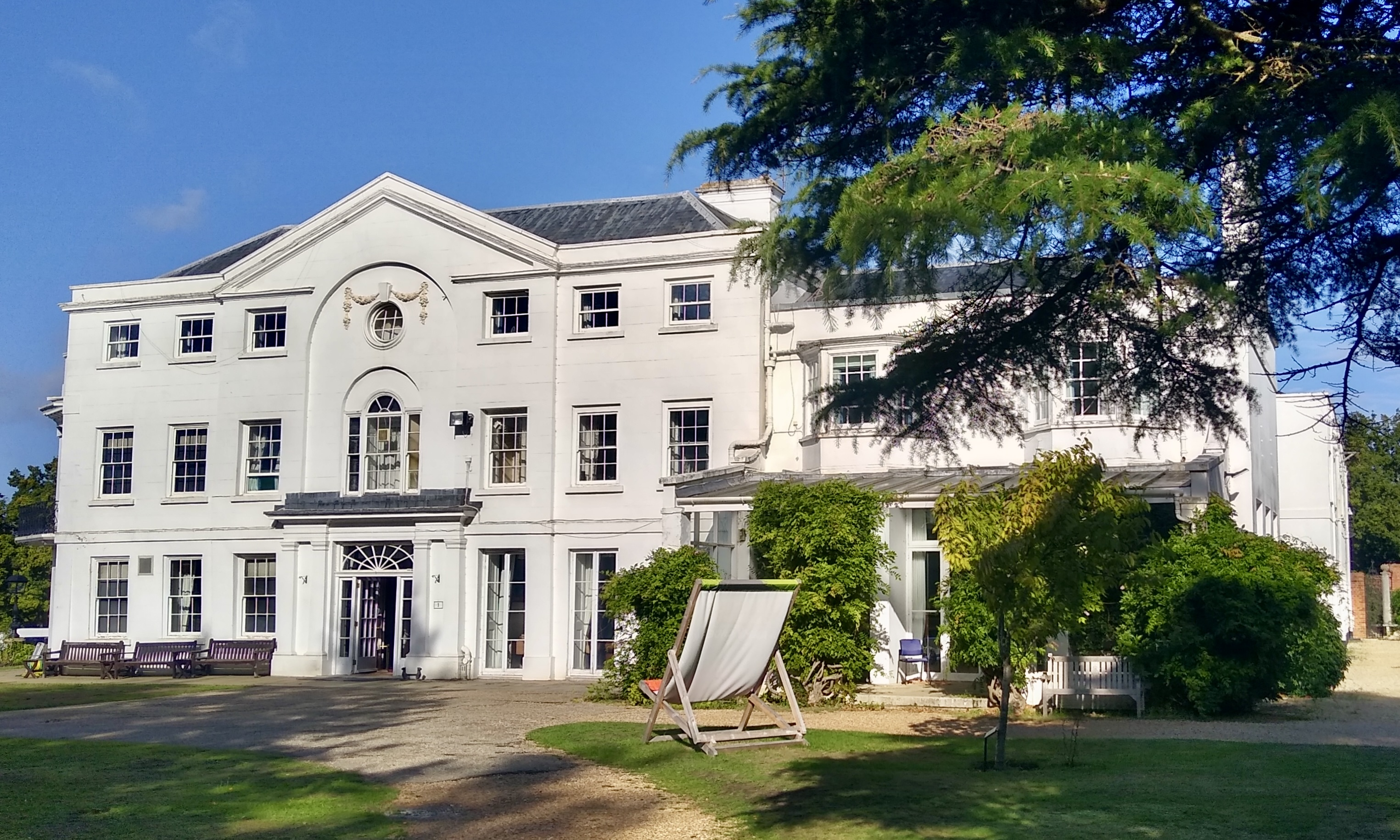

- Location within Surrey
- 51°19′01″N 0°44′38″W
- Location: Frimley
- OS grid reference: SU 87583 58411

History
- Built: 1760

Site notes
- Area: Surrey
- Owner: Ministry of Defence

Listed Building – Grade II
- Official name: Frimley Park Mansion
- Designated: 19 July 1984
- Reference no.: 1030070

National Register of Historic Parks and Gardens
- Official name: Frimley Park
- Designated: 6 July 2000
- Reference no.: 1001472

Frimley Park in Frimley, Surrey, England, consists of Frimley Park mansion, a Grade II listed building, and the formal gardens, designed by Edward White in 1920. The house and gardens are all that remain of an estate that once encompassed more than 590 hectares (1,500 acres). Since 1949 it has belonged to the War Office (now the Ministry of Defence), and currently hosts an Army Cadet training centre.

== History ==
The estate of Frimley Manor was sold by Sir Henry Tichborne to James Lawrell the elder for £20,000 in 1789. (Note: James Lawrell name is also spelt "James Laurell" in some sources.) In 1806 the estate was divided. James Lawrell the younger kept what was referred to as Frimley Manor, while Frimley Park mansion and 590 hectares (1,500 acres) of land were sold to John Tekells.

In the early 1860s most of the estate was parcelled up and sold off. The house with 56 hectares (140 acres) of land was purchased by the Whig politician William Crompton-Stansfield in 1862.

Theodore Alexander Ralli bought the estate in 1920, and commissioned Edward White (c. 1873–1952) to lay out a formal rose garden and sunken garden. In 1947 (shortly after the end of World War II) more land was sold separately and the remaining 12 hectares (30 acres) was purchased by the Officers' Association who two years later (in 1949) sold what remained of the estate to the current owners, the War Department (now the Ministry of Defence).
