= Matthew Towgood III =

English Presbyterian minister and banker (1727–1891)

The Reverend Matthew Towgood III
- Born: Moreton Hampstead, Devon, England
- Baptised: 7 July 1727
- Died: 26 January 1791; London, England
- Occupation(s): Presbyterian minister and banker
- Known for: Founding the bank Langston, Polhill, Towgood and Amory; founding New College, Hackney
- Spouse: Mary Mills (m. 1752)
- Children: 5, including Matthew
- Father: Michaijah Towgood (father)
- Relatives: Frederick Towgood (grandson)
- Family: Towgood family

Matthew Towgood III (1727 – 26 January 1791) was an English Presbyterian minister and banker. From a noted nonconformist background, he associated with campaigners against religious restriction, and was one of the founders of the bank Langston, Polhill, Towgood and Amory and the dissenting academy New College, Hackney.

== Life ==
Matthew Towgood was born in 1727 and was baptised on 6 July at Moreton Hampstead, Devon. He was the son of Michaijah Towgood, a leading figure in Rational Dissent. Michaijah Towgood's grandfather Matthew Towgood I was an ejected minister, and his father was Matthew Towgood MD II (died 1715).

Towgood in early life settled at Bridgwater, in 1747. He served as a Presbyterian minister. He left his ministry in 1755, becoming a merchant.

Towgood then went to London, and took up finance. In 1764 he was an insurance broker. The barrister John Baker saw him in 1776 at "Old Lloyd's" (Lloyd's Coffee House, from which Lloyd's of London had moved a couple of years earlier).

From 1773 Towgood was a banker. Around 1777 he was involved in setting up the bank Langston, Polhill, Towgood and Amory, at 29 Clement's Lane, near Lombard Street, London, with partners James Haughton Langston (father of John Langston) and Nathaniel Polhill. The bank continued to trade under related names until 1811, when it merged with the Rogers family bank. The Clement's Lane banker Samuel Amory (died 1799) was grandfather of Sir John Heathcoat-Amory, 1st Baronet.

Towgood was for a time in the congregation of the Newington Green meeting-house. In London politics he was a supporter of John Wilkes and James Townsend, and signed the pro-American petition of 1775. He attended the large nonconformist gathering of December 1785 following the closures of Warrington Academy in 1782, and Hoxton Academy that year, and was a member of the Repeal Committee of 1786, which lobbied against the Test Acts, in both cases with his son John. The 1785 meeting appointed a committee to found what became the dissenting academy New College, Hackney. Towgood was on the committee, with Samuel Heywood, Richard Price, Thomas Rogers, Benjamin Vaughan and Hugh Worthington; Rogers, Towgood and Michael Dodson acted as treasurers in the early days to the "New Institution", as the college was initially known.

Towgood attended a dinner on 1 July 1786 given in Clapham by William Smith for John Adams, with two of his sons; other guests there also of the Repeal Committee were Andrew Kippis and Joseph Paice. He was a member of the Worshipful Company of Fishmongers, as were his sons John, Matthew IV and William.

Towgood died on 26 January 1791. Richard Price preached a funeral sermon for him on 6 February 1791.

== Family ==
Towgood married Mary Mills on 23 June 1752 at the Church of St John the Baptist, Bristol. She was the sister of the banker John Mills (died 1769). A note to the diary of John Baker gives Matthew Mills of St Kitts as her father (allowing for a mistake Elizabeth for Mary), and lists the children of the marriage as "John William, Matthew, Elizabeth and Mary"; what it cites in The History of Antigua by Vere Langford Oliver clarifies the errors and gives five children: "John, W^{m}, Mathew, Eliz. and Mary".

His three sons all became bankers:

- John, his elder brother (1757–1837), who married Martha, daughter of Thomas Rogers. He was involved in a plantation on St Kitts through a mortgage.
- William, banker in Bristol, with Savery, Towgood et al., who died in 1835. This bank drew on Smith & Payne, and then Rogers, Towgood & Co. He married Susannah Yerbury.
- Matthew (died 1830), known for his association with paper making.

Of his daughters, Mary married in 1779 the Bristol banker John Savery, as his second wife, and was mother of 16 children, among them Henry Savery.
