= Micaiah Towgood =

English dissenting minister (1700–1792)

The Reverend Micaiah Towgood
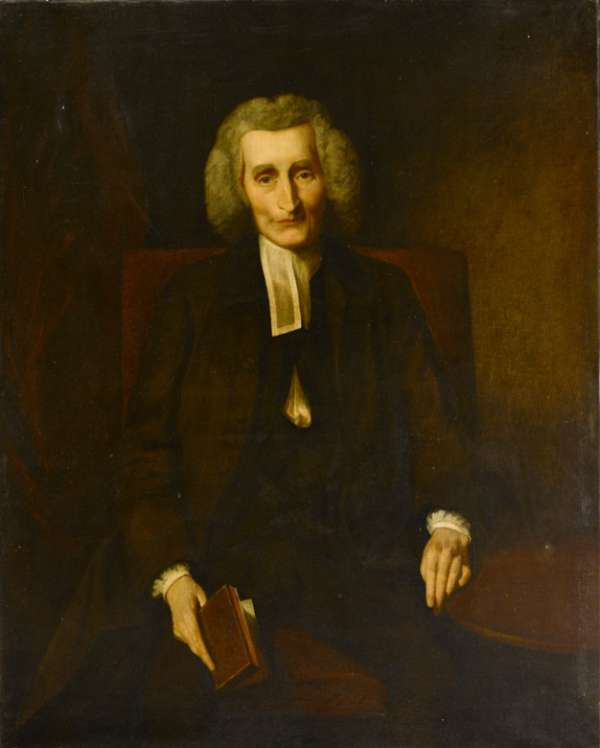
- Towgood, c. 1783
- Born: 17 December 1700; Axminster, Devonshire, England
- Died: 1 February 1792 (aged 91); Exeter, England
- Resting place: Exeter Dissenters' Graveyard
- Other name: Michaijah Towgood
- Occupations: English dissenting minister; theologian; writer
- Known for: Theological controversies, particularly Dissenting Gentleman's Letters
- Spouse: Mary Hawker (m. 1723; died 1759)
- Children: 4, including Matthew
- Relatives: Matthew Towgood IV (grandson); Frederick Towgood (great-grandson)
- Family: Towgood family

Micaiah Towgood (also spelled Michaijah; 17 December 1700 – 1 February 1792) was an English dissenting minister, theologian, and writer. He was known as having Arian views and was a theological controversialist.

== Life ==
The second son of Michaijah Towgood, M.D. (died 1715), he was born at Axminster, Devonshire, on 17 December 1700. He was at school with Thomas Amory, and with him entered in 1717 the dissenting academy in Taunton run by Stephen James and Henry Grove. On leaving he was called to succeed Angel Spark (died 1721) as minister of the presbyterian congregation at Moreton Hampstead, Devon, where he was ordained on 22 August 1722. He had a substantial congregation, and concentrated on pastoral work. Accepting at Christmas 1736 a call to Crediton, Devon, in succession to Josiah Eveleigh (died 1736), he moved there in January 1737.

On the death of James Green (1749), Towgood became colleague (1750) to his first cousin, Stephen Towgood (son of Stephen Towgood, his father's elder brother), as pastor of James's meeting, Exeter. The position was influential, and the duties were light; the Bow meeting had its two pastors, John Lavington and John Walrond; the four preached in rotation at the two places. James's meeting had been purged in 1719 by the exclusion of Joseph Hallett II and James Peirce. Towgood, originally orthodox, was now a high Arian, with views similar to Thomas Emlyn. He had the terms of membership relaxed; and in May 1753 the Exeter assembly quashed its resolution of September 1718 requiring adhesion to a Trinitarian formulary.

In 1760 Towgood's congregation left James's meeting for the newly built George's meeting in South Street, Exeter. In the same year he took part in the establishment of the new Exeter academy for university-level teaching. A building for the purpose was given by William Mackworth Praed the younger; the library of the Taunton academy (closed October 1759) was moved to there. Towgood took the department of biblical exegesis. The institution lasted till the death (December 1771) of its divinity tutor, Samuel Merivale.

On the death (1777) of his cousin, Towgood had as colleague James Manning (1754–1831), father of James Manning the barrister. He resigned his charge in 1782, and was succeeded after an interval by Timothy Kenrick.

Towgood died on 1 February 1792. He was buried on 7 February at Exeter Dissenters' Graveyard.

== Works ==
At Crediton Towgood began a series of controversial publications, which culminated in the Dissenting Gentleman's Letters (1746–8) in reply to John White (died 1755), perpetual curate of Stoke Nayland, Suffolk. White had published A Letter to a Gentleman Dissenting from the Church of England and sequels from 1743. This major work made his reputation, and became a classic compendium of nonconformist argument. A True Idea of the Character and Reign of King Charles the First, and The True Causes of The Civil War, published in 1748, marked contentiously the centenary of the death of Charles I of England.

Towgood published, besides single sermons:

- High-flown Episcopal and Priestly Claims Examined, 1737, reprinted in Richard Baron's Cordial for Low Spirits, 1763, vol. iii.
- The Dissenter's Apology, 1739, against John Warren, D.D.
- Spanish Cruelty and Injustice, 1741.
- Recovery from Sickness, 1742, often reprinted.
- Afflictions Improved, 1743; prefixed is an account of a fire which destroyed West Crediton.
- The Dissenting Gentleman's Answer, 1746; second letter, 1747; third letter, 1738 [i.e. 1748]; postscript, 1750, (all anon.); collected with author's name and title: A Dissent from the Church of England fully justified, 15th edit., Newry, 1816, has appendices by William Bruce and Andrew George Malcom; abridged by author, with title, A Calm Answer, 1772.
- An Essay … of the Character and Reign of King Charles the First, 1748; 1780; 1811.
- The Baptism of Infants, 1750; supplemented by Dipping not the Only Scriptural and Primitive Manner of Baptizing, 1751. These provoked replies by Grantham Killingworth and John Gill.
- Serious and Free Thoughts on … the Church, 1755.
- The Grounds of Faith in Jesus Christ, 1784.

Three papers by him signed "Paulus" are in The Old Whig, 1739.

Towgood corresponded with John Wesley in 1755, John and Charles Wesley read together Towgood's "A Gentleman's Reasons for his Dissent from the Church of England", in preparation for their Conference at Leeds. Wesley described it as "an elaborate and lively tract."

== Personal life ==
Towgood married Mary Hawker on 25 May 1723 in Exeter. She was a daughter of James Hawker of Luppitt, Devon. The couple had four children, of whom a daughter survived him; his wife died in 1759. His son Matthew (1727–1791) was educated at Bridgwater under John Moore (died 1748), was minister at Bridgwater (1747–1755), afterwards merchant, and ultimately (1773) a banker in London, where he died in January 1791, leaving issue.

Towgood had a slight speech impediment, which he never entirely overcame, but was known as an effective preacher.
