= Frederick Towgood =

English businessperson, writer, and social reformer (1807–1860)

- Born: 5 October 1807; Russell Square, Middlesex, England
- Died: 27 June 1860 (aged 52); Hillingdon, Middlesex, England
- Resting place: St Margaret's Church, Uxbridge
- Other name: Frederic Towgood
- Occupations: Businessperson; writer; social reformer
- Known for: Temperance and vegetarianism advocacy
- Spouse: Ann Napier Ross (m. 1857; died 1860)
- Father: Matthew Towgood IV
- Relatives: Matthew Towgood III (grandfather); Micaiah Towgood (great-grandfather)
- Family: Towgood family

Signature
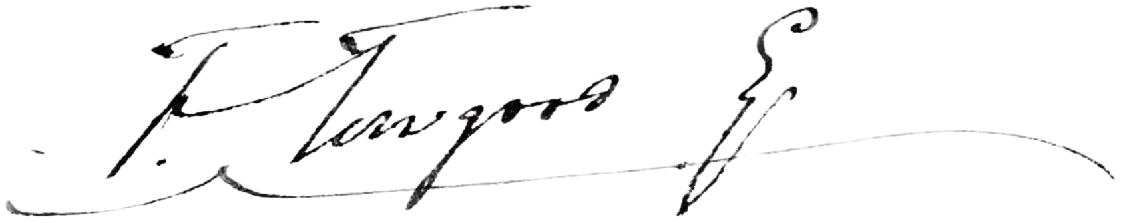

Frederick Towgood (Note: His first name is also recorded as Frederic.) (5 October 1807 – 27 June 1860) was an English businessperson, writer, and social reformer. He advocated temperance and vegetarianism, and also wrote on or supported phrenology, mesmerism, homeopathy, hydropathy, and physiology. Towgood served as president of the Anthropological Society of London, the City of London Temperance Society, and the London Vegetarian Association.

== Biography ==
=== Early life and career ===
Frederick Towgood was born on 5 October 1807 in Russell Square, Middlesex, the son of Ann (née Gibson) and Matthew Towgood. His father, a banker, owned a paper mill in Little Paxton. After their father's death, Frederick and his brother Edward took over the company, which traded as Towgood Bros. Towgood worked in business until his retirement in 1856.

=== Social reform ===
After retiring, Towgood worked on causes connected with education, health, and moral reform. He was an associate of William Horsell and Jabez Inwards.

Towgood supported vegetarianism, (Note: Towgood has been described as a vegan.) total abstinence from alcohol, and avoidance of tobacco. He regarded these practices as matters of health and morality, and presented them as consistent with science and biblical teaching. Towgood served as president of the City of London Temperance Society. He was the first treasurer of the London Band of Hope Union from 1855. He also served as president of the London Vegetarian Association until his resignation in 1857.

=== Other interests and activities ===
Towgood had interests in phrenology, mesmerism, homeopathy, hydropathy, and physiology. He lectured on phrenology at Camden Hall in 1855 and contributed articles on the subject. In 1856, he served as president of the Anthropological Society of London and treasurer of the newly formed London Phrenological Society. He was co-editor of the Journal of Health & Phrenological Magazine in 1850 and edited 12 issues from 1855 to 1856.

Towgood admired the Unitarian preacher William Ellery Channing and travelled internationally, including to America.

=== Personal life and death ===
In 1845, Towgood was granted the Freedom of the City of London by patrimony, as the legitimate son of his father, who had previously been admitted to the freedom.

Towgood married Ann Napier Ross on 21 February 1857 at St Luke's Church, Chelsea. She died on 30 May 1860 in Hillingdon, Middlesex. Towgood died after several weeks of illness on 27 June 1860, also in Hillingdon, and was buried at St Margaret's Church, Uxbridge.

== Selected publications ==
Towgood wrote under several pseudonyms. His works include:

- (Anonymous) Original Views on Diet with Rules of Health and Longevity Intended for All Classes of Society with Remarks Addressed to Consumptive Patients of the Water Cure as Practised by Vincent Priessnitz of Graefenberg, Silesia, by One of Nature's School (1849)
- As "Omega", The Coming Times (1852)
- Christian Precepts
- As "Redivivus", A Sign and Warning (1852)
- Voices of the Sages, the Times, and the Ages; or, Historical Gleanings; Teaching the Way to Attain Health and Longevity, Virtue and Happiness, and Avoid Disease and Early Death, Crime and Misery (c. 1854)
- Anthropology; or, the Science of Human Nature Part I (c. 1856)
- The Life and Character of Sylvester Graham (c. 1860)
