= James Rawdon Stansfeld =

British army instructor (1866–1936)

Colonel James Rawdon Stansfeld CB CBE
- Born: 11 August 1866
- Died: 14 January 1936 (aged 69)
- Occupation: Soldier
- Spouse: Eleanor Susan Martineau
- Children: 2
- Relatives: William Crompton-Stansfield; Sir James Stansfeld; Hamer Stansfeld; Thomas Wolryche Stansfeld; John R. E. Stansfeld
- Military career
- Allegiance: United Kingdom
- Branch: British Army
- Service years: 1885–1919
- Rank: Captain (1895); Major (1904); Lieutenant-Colonel (1913); Colonel
- Unit: Royal Artillery

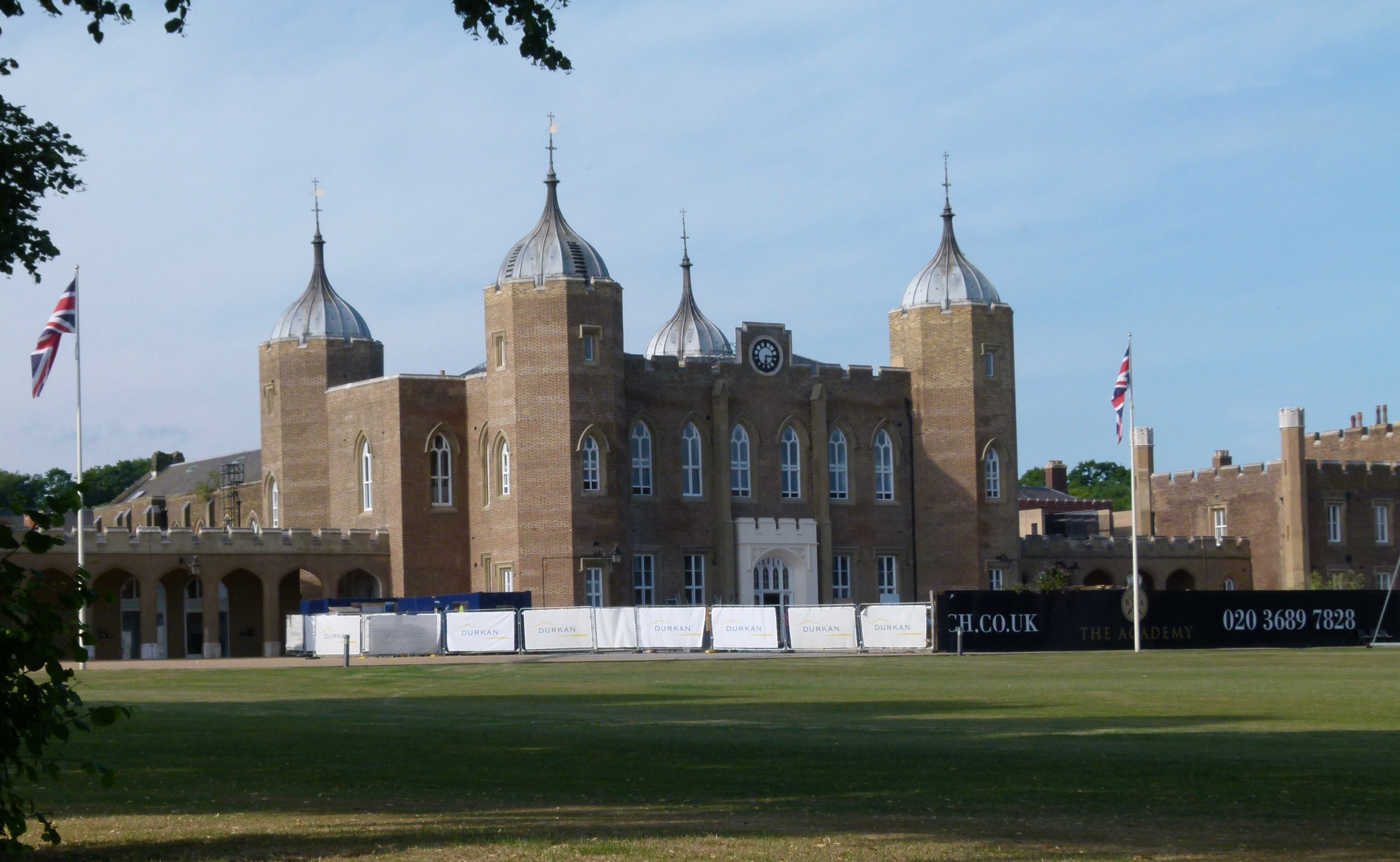
Royal Military Academy, Woolwich

James Rawdon Stansfeld CB CBE (/ˈrɔːdɒn ˈstænsfiːld/ RAW-don STANSS-feeld; 11 August 1866 – 14 January 1936) was a British army officer who served as an Instructor and Professor at the Royal Military Academy, Woolwich, and as Deputy Director-General of Inspection in the Ministry of Munitions (1916–19).

== Early life ==
Stansfeld was born on 11 August 1866, he was the son of Lt-Gen. Thomas Wolrich Stansfeld Jnr (1829–1910), and grandson of Thomas Wolrich Stansfeld Snr (1779–1853). Thomas Snr was the eldest son of David Stansfield (1755–1818) of Hope Hall, Halifax, and his wife Sarah Wolrich (1757–1824), daughter of Thomas Wolrich (1719–91) of Armley House, Leeds. He was a descendant of the Stansfeld family of Stansfield and Sowerby, Yorkshire, and a cousin of the politicians William Crompton-Stansfield, Sir James Stansfeld, and Hamer Stansfeld, and the soldiers Thomas Wolryche Stansfeld and John R. E. Stansfeld.

== Career ==
Stansfeld was educated at Cheltenham College and the Royal Military Academy, Woolwich, before he joined the Royal Artillery in 1885. He married Eleanor Susan Martineau, the daughter of William Martineau, in 1887, and the marriage produced two children. He was an adjutant for the Volunteers from 1891 to 1896, rising to the rank of Captain (1895).

At the Ordnance College, he was an instructor (1901–03) then professor (1903–04) and chief instructor and major (1904). He was appointed to the Inspection Staff as an inspector (1905–06) then as inspector of steel (1908–12). He was chief inspector at Woolwich (1913–16) and was promoted to lieutenant-colonel in 1913.

He became deputy director-general of inspection in the Ministry of Munitions (1916–19). He also served as a member of the Committee for the Imperial War Museum (1917–20).

== Honours ==
Stansfeld was appointed Companion of the Order of the Bath (CB) in the 1917 New Year Honours and a Commander of the Order of the British Empire (CBE) in the 1919 Birthday Honours. He died on 14 January 1936.
