= Matthew Towgood =

English banker, industrialist, and papermaker (1761–1831)

- Born: 17 December 1761; London, England
- Died: 1 January 1831 (aged 69); Little Paxton, Huntingdonshire, England
- Occupations: Banker, industrialist, paper manufacturer
- Known for: Proprietor of a paper mill near St Neots
- Spouses: Margaret Moore (m. 1784; died 1803) Ann Gibson (m. 1804)
- Children: 24, including Frederick
- Parent: Matthew Towgood III (father)
- Relatives: Micaiah Towgood (grandfather)
- Family: Towgood family

Matthew Towgood IV (17 December 1761 – 1 January 1831) was an English banker, industrialist, and papermaker. From around 1808, he was the proprietor of a paper mill near St Neots, then in Huntingdonshire.

== Life ==
=== Early life ===
Matthew Towgood IV was born on 17 December 1761. He was the son of Matthew Towgood III.

=== Banking career ===
Towgood was banker to Henry Fourdrinier. As banker, he advanced sums of money to the brothers Henry and Sealy Fourdrinier, who were developing paper-making machinery; and was later taken as a partner into the firm of Bloxham & Fourdrinier. D. C. Coleman suggests the reason Towgood became a partner may have been a loan extended by Langston, Towgood & Co. The Fourdrinier debt is described as having run up to £50,000 or £60,000; but also as with Rogers, Towgood & Co., which was the name of the bank created in 1811 after Langston, Towgood & Co. merged into the Rogers family bank.

=== Background on Bloxham & Fourdrinier ===
A 1809 bank run happened in parallel with the crisis on the future of the paper machines. Bloxham & Fourdrinier was for most of its existence a wholesale stationer in Lombard Street, London, co-founded by Matthew Bloxam (also Bloxham, later a Member of Parliament and knighted) and trading at one point as Foudrinier, Bloxam, and Walker; The Fourdriniers were descendants of Paul Fourdrinier who died in 1758. Bloxham became an apprentice stationer in 1759.

Bloxham joined the Southwark Bank (so trading) in 1791, in partnership with Sanderson, Harrison and John Brenchley. He further in 1794 involved the banking consortium of Wilkinson, Polhill, Pinhorn and Bulcock in the bank. The Southwark bank moved to a new Gracechurch Street building in 1802.

Matthew's son William Bloxham (c.1780–1869) left the stationery partnership in 1803; and that year married Ann Burnett, third daughter of Sir Robert Burnett, the distiller at Vauxhall. He settled at Moditonham House in Cornwall. The style of the bank in 1805 was Sir Matthew Bloxham, Wilkinson, Taylor and Bloxham. It was commented in 1964 that "surely no concern was run so haphazardly as that of Sir Mathew Bloxham, Wilkinson, Taylor and Bloxham of 27, Gracechurch Street, which failed eventually in 1809."

=== Outcome for Fourdrinier businesses ===
Financially stretched, the Fourdriniers made over their share of a paper mill at St Neots, acquired in 1807 to Towgood. While the mill nominally belonged to John Gamble, Towgood moved to remove Gamble's claim to it. Both Towgood and Matthew Towgood V became partners in the firm, with Towgood (Matthew IV) shortly dropping out. In 1811 the partnership running the stationery business in Sherborne Lane, City of London, given as Henry and Charles Fourdrinier, Matthew Towgood V, J. B. Hunt, W. Abbott and F. Morse, was wound up. Matthew Bloxham maintained some contact at that period through Bryan Donkin.

The partnership between Gamble and Matthew Towgood V was dissolved in 1811. Gamble subsequently described the course of events, attributing to the absence of any mention in the partnership deed of his paper machine, one of two then existing, his loss of the capital invested in it because he did not have ready money to pay for a share.

=== Paper mill development ===
The acquisition of the paper mill has been taken to be the end of Towgood's involvement with banking. It became a viable business, and innovated, for example with the dandy roll for watermarks supplied in 1827 to Towgood by John Marshall of London.

=== Death ===
Towgood died on 1 January 1831 in Little Paxton, Huntingdonshire. He was buried on 3 January at St James, Little Paxton.

== Family ==
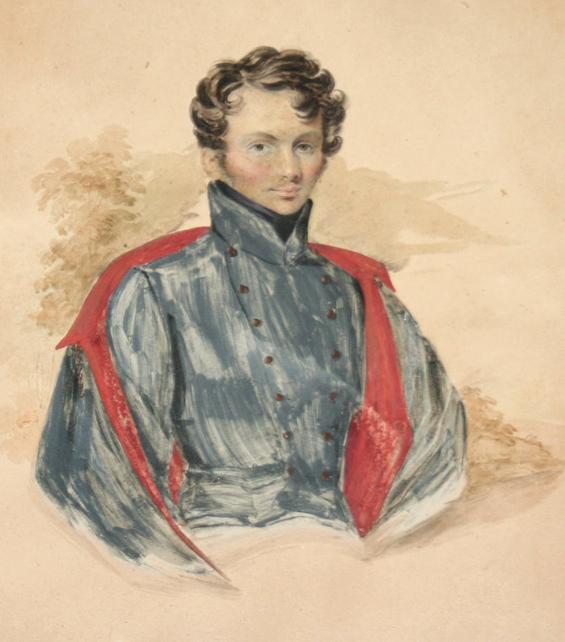
Joseph Towgood

Towgood married twice and had 24 children. He married his first wife, Margaret Moore, on 12 December 1784 in St Mary, Marylebone, London. She died in 1803. He married Ann Gibson in Marton on 28 September 1804. At this period, he brought in Humphry Repton to produce plans for landscaping the grounds at New Barnes, and these were carried out. In 1823 he was the tenant of Riversfield on the banks of the River Great Ouse at Little Paxton near St Neots, by the paper mill.

Of the sons:

- Matthew Towgood V, married in 1827, as of Dartford, Maria Frances Witherington, daughter of Lieut. Witherington of the 63rd Regiment. His paper mill in Dartford was a major supplier of paper to Cambridge University Press by the mid-1820s.
- Joseph Towgood (1810–1858) was educated at Elizabeth College, Guernsey, and became a lieutenant-colonel in the 35th Regiment Bengal Native Infantry. His only daughter Emma Rosaline (died 1928 at age 90) married in 1860 Arthur Towgood of Great Paxton, a cousin, the second son of Edward Towgood below.
- Edward Towgood married in 1830 Sarah Bischoff, eldest daughter of James Bischoff. Their daughter Marian married Thomas Wolryche Stansfeld (1822–1885) as his first wife.
- Frederick Towgood (1807–1860) married Ann Napier in 1856. He was a writer, reformer, and activist who championed phrenology, temperance, and vegetarianism.

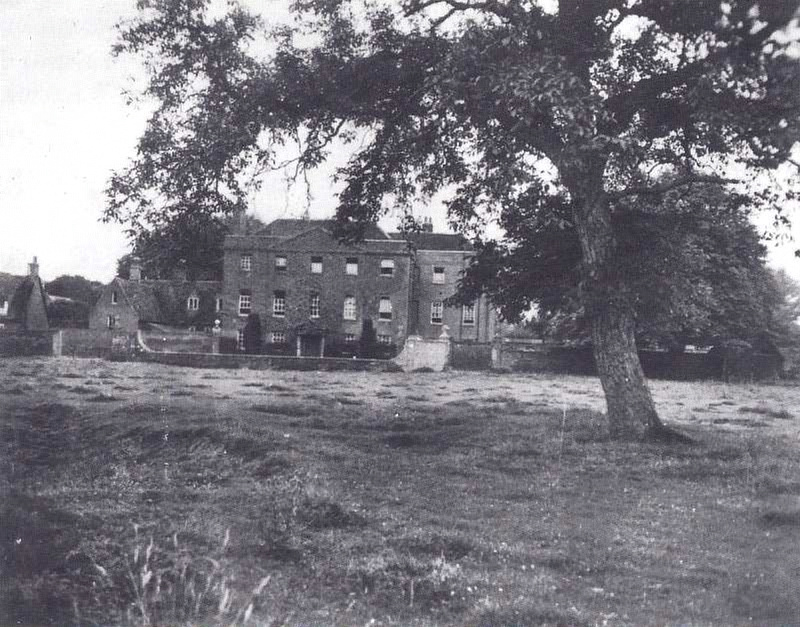
Robert Louis Towgood resided at Farm Hall, Godmanchester, which was used for Operation Epsilon

In 1831, after his father's death, Edward Towgood took over the St Neots paper mill, with his brother Frederick. Frederick retired from the firm in 1856, being replaced by another brother, Alfred. Edward died in 1883, Alfred continuing in sole charge of the business. The mill passed out of the family in 1888, as its lease expired and Alfred died. Robert Louis Towgood (1865–1942), Alfred's son, was a director of Towgood & Beckwith, paper manufacturers in St Neots. Towgood & Beckwith was set up in 1902 to combine paper interests, of Robert Louis Towgood at the Arborfield Mills, Helpston, and of Arthur Beckwith at the Usk Paper Works, Crickhowell.

Of the daughters:

- Ellen married in 1845 Hamer Stansfeld, Mayor of Leeds in 1843.
- Catherine married in 1850 Francis Wansey of Arborfield.
