= Dunninald Castle =

Privately owned castle in Angus, Scotland

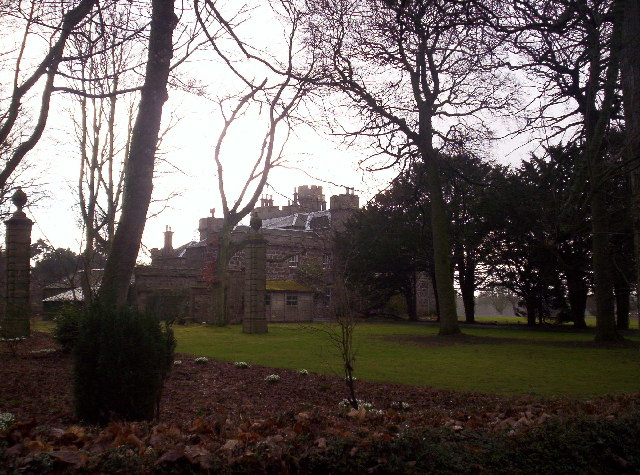
- Dunninald Castle

General information
- Type: Private Residence
- Location: Craig, Angus, Craig, United Kingdom
- Coordinates: 56.6792°N 2.4856°W

Design and construction
- Architect: James Gillespie Graham
- Designations

Listed Building – Category A
- Official name: Dunninald Castle
- Designated: 11 June 1971
- Reference no.: LB4972

Inventory of Gardens and Designed Landscapes in Scotland
- Official name: Dunninald
- Designated: 30 March 2006
- Reference no.: GDL00159

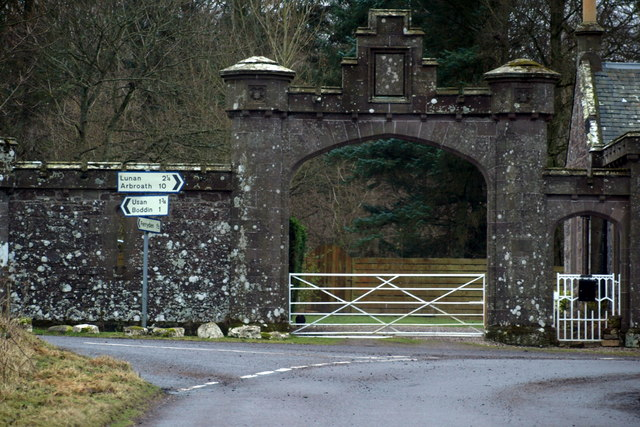
North Lodge Entrance to Dunninald Castle

Dunninald Castle is a privately owned country house south of Montrose in Angus, Scotland, which was listed as Category A by Historic Scotland in 1971.

== History ==
The name Dunninald is derived from the Gaelic expressions "Dun" (fortification, castle) and "Ard" (high, towering). Dunninald has given its name to three buildings since the Middle Ages. The first Dunninald Castle referred to a castle known colloquially as Black Jack Castle on a cliff above the North Sea.

The second building was a manor house, built around 1590, which was near the location of today's building. the property was held by the Gray family until 1610 Patrick Leighton of Usan acquired the property in 1617 before it passed to Thomas Allardyce of Allardyce through marriage in 1663. It was sold to the Scotts of Usan in 1696. The foundations of the surrounding park were probably laid during the 17th century. In the 1800s the property passed to the Scotts of Logie. The merchant, chairman of the East India Company and later politician David Scott bought Dunninald from his brother Archibald in 1786 after his return from India. Scott entrusted James Playfair with the design of a new mansion and a planned settlement however Scott's numerous obligations and poor health, as well as Playfair's death in 1794, meant that the plans were not implemented.

After Scott's death in 1805, his son inherited the property but having inherited another property, he sold Dunninald to Robert Spears. In 1811, the estate was acquired by Peter Arkley and he hired the Scottish architect James Gillespie Graham to build a new house. Construction began in 1819 and was completed in 1824. The gardens and parks were developed around the turn of the twentieth century and the present building has remained largely unchanged to this day. Patrick Arkley's daughter, Eliza Arkley, married John Stansfeld (1840–1928) of Field House, Sowerby, and it remains the residence of the Stansfeld family.

== Architecture ==
Dunninald Castle is a large two-storey Gothic Revival castellated mansion house was completed in 1824 by the architect James Gillespie Graham. It has a three-storey corner tower and stair turret and good interiors.

== See also ==
- Sir James Stansfeld
- John Raymond Evelyn Stansfeld
- William Crompton-Stansfeld
- Field House, Sowerby
- Stansfield, West Yorkshire
