= Field House, Sowerby =

Grade II* listed privately owned historic house in Triangle, West Yorkshire, England

Field House
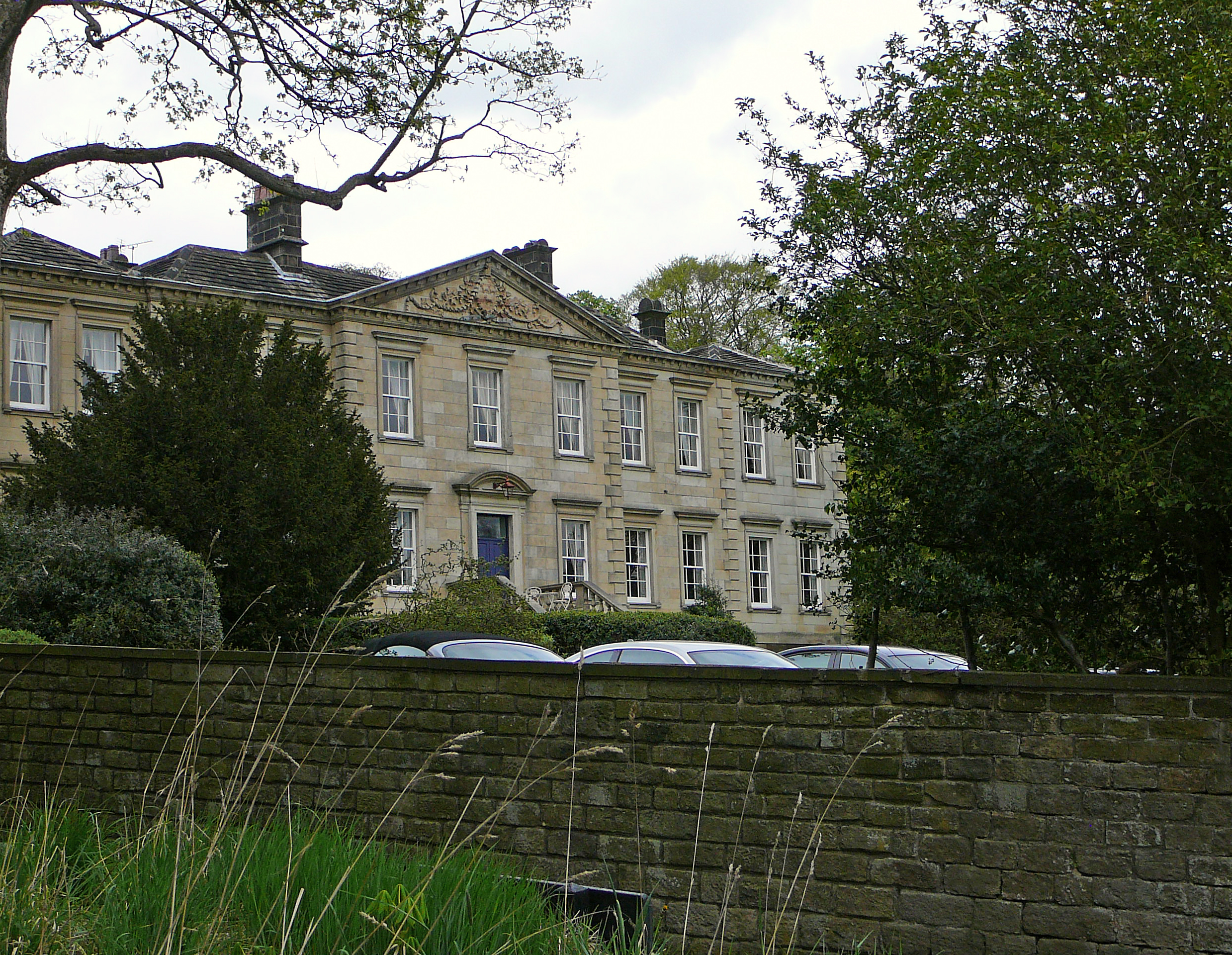
- Field House, Triangle
- Interactive map of the Field House area

General information
- Type: Private Residence
- Architectural style: Palladian
- Location: Triangle, England
- Coordinates: 53.7002°N 1.9385°W

Design and construction
- Designations

Listed Building – Grade II*
- Official name: Field House, Triangle
- Designated: 15 November 1966
- Reference no.: 1313736

Listed Building – Grade II
- Official name: Field House Old Hall, Triangle
- Designated: 15 November 1966
- Reference no.: 1134527

Field House is a Grade II* listed privately owned historic house in Triangle, West Yorkshire, England.

== History ==
Field House (Old Hall) is mentioned as being in the possession of William Brig in 1533 and it passed to other owners during the 17th century but by the 1740s was owned by George Stansfeld (1725–1805) of Sowerby, a descendant of the Stansfeld family of Stansfield, Yorkshire. He built a new house (Field House) in 1749, and this estate later passed to his cousin Robert Stansfeld (1771–1855), then his son, Col. Robert Stansfeld (1805–85), to his second son, John Stansfeld (1840–1928) who married Eliza Arkley of Dunninald Castle, and then passed to a cousin, George Reginald Stansfeld (1870–1964).

== Architecture ==
=== Field House Old Hall ===
This Grade II listed house, dating from the early 17th century and with 19th century alterations, is now 2 dwellings. It has hollow-moulded double-chamfered mullion windows and a heavily-moulded Tudor-arched doorway amongst other features.

=== Field House ===
This Grade II* listed house is in a Palladian style, with some 19th century additions and incorporating earlier elements (a 16th century Perpendicular style transomed 5-light pointed-arch window, and 2 columns supporting a cupola-style bellcote with tripled columns and finials) from St Peter's Church, Sowerby when it was rebuilt in 1762.

Other listed aspects of the site include:

The Grade II listed Stables, which probably dates from the mid-18th century with mid-19th century additions and a reused seventeenth century 6-light double-chamfered mullion window.

The Grade II listed Workshop and Barn Range (incorporating 4 cottages) which probably dates from the mid 18th century but with late 16th and early 17th century features (such as reused hollow-moulded double-chamfered mullion windows) and 19th century alterations.

The Grade II listed Orangery (dating from 1749 but in character probably c. 1874). Also, a 19th century Fountain, some pairs of mid-18th century Gate Piers, mid-19th century Gate Piers, and late 19th century Gate Piers (dated 1749 rebuilt 1874).

== Gallery ==
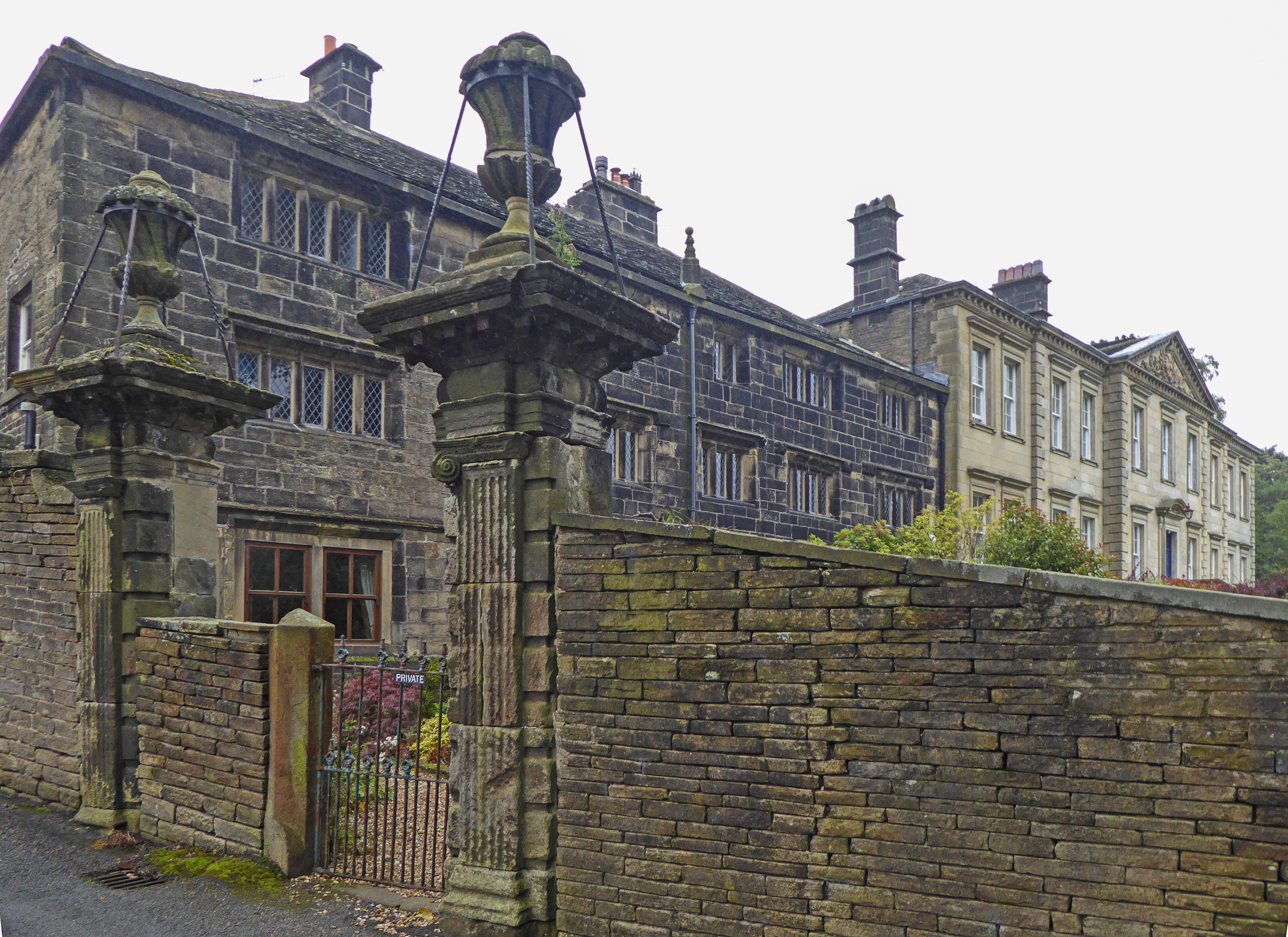
Old and New Field House, Sowerby

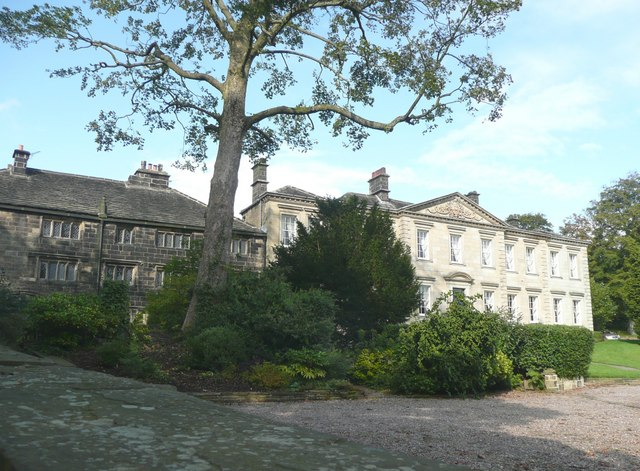
Old Field House and Field House, Sowerby

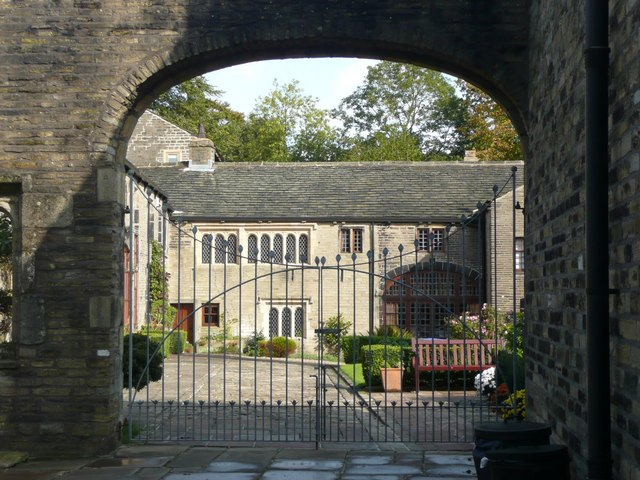
Courtyard of Field House, Sowerby

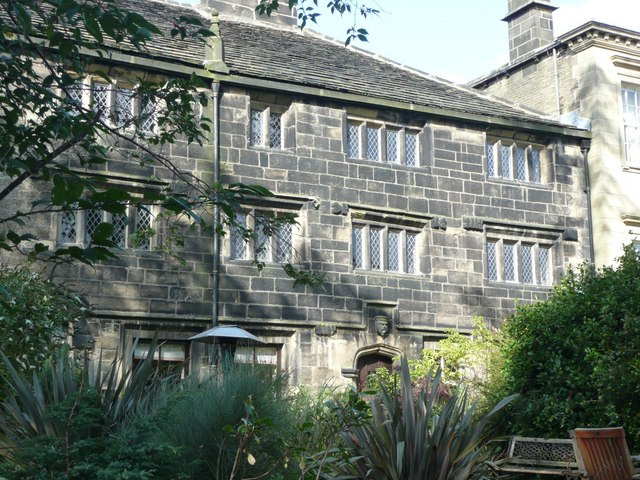
Old Field House, Sowerby

== See also ==
- Dunninald Castle
- Stansfeld
