= Edward Roe Yeo =

British Member of Parliament

Edward Roe Yeo (Note: Alternative spellings of his middle name given as "Rooe" in his History of Parliament biography, "Rouse" by Vivian (1895), and "Roise" by the editors of the 1811 edition of Risdon.) (3 July 1742 – 23 December 1782) was a British Member of Parliament.

He was the only son of George Yeo of Huish, Devon by his wife Ann Beresford. Educated at Eton College 1758–60, and at Exeter College, Oxford 1761, he trained as a lawyer in the Middle Temple, 1751.

He was twice Member of Parliament for Coventry, 1774–1780 and from 27 February 1781 to 23 December 1782 (his death), though there is no record of him having spoken in Parliament.

He died unmarried on 23 December 1782, and was the last in the line of Yeo of Huish.
