= Chipps Chippendale =

British journalist

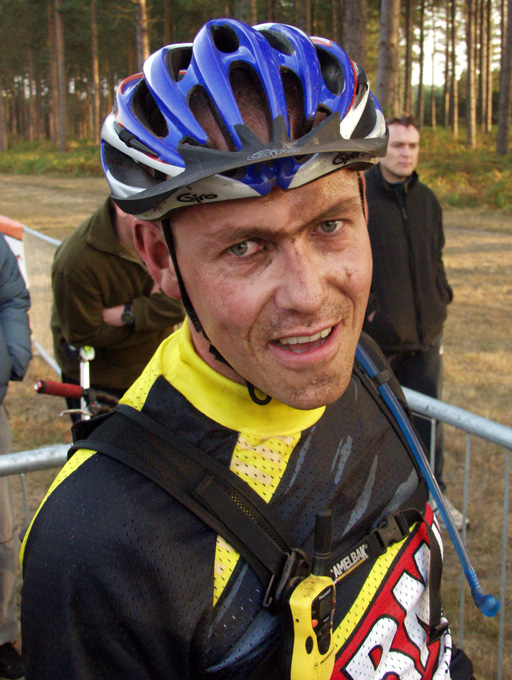
Chipps Chippendale

Chipps Chippendale (real name William Henry James Chippendale III) is a mountain biking journalist in the UK. After working as a bicycle messenger, his journalistic career started in 1994 with the UK magazine MTB Pro, on which he worked for five years. After the magazine was closed down by its publishers, Future Publishing, he went freelance, contributing to Mountain Biking UK, Total Bike, Maximum Mountain Bike and others. He also wrote for Clarks Originals, for whom he wrote a book about 50 years of the (Clarks) Desert Boot.

In early 2000, he started working for 9feet.com, a startup website specialising in outdoor gear. He worked there for nearly a year until meeting Mark Alker and Shaun Murray, then of www.gofar-mtb.com, a privately run mountain bike website. They suggested he join them and start making a print magazine. The three of them created Singletrack in 2001 with Chippendale as founding editor. He is still the editor and regularly writes and photographs for it.

Chippendale is generally credited with popularising singlespeed mountain biking in the UK - an idea he claims to have stolen from Bike magazine's editor Mike Ferrentino - and is a collaborator in The Outcast, an underground singlespeed fanzine. He organised the UK's first Singlespeed National Championships in 1995 (Stow on the Wold) and subsequent ones in 1996, 1997, 1998, 1999 and 2001 (all in Cheddar, Somerset), culminating in organising the Singlespeed World Championships in Afan Argoed in 2001. He is also the organiser of the Todmorden cyclocross race, held every year since 2009.

Chipps moved to Todmorden in late 2001, coinciding with Singletrack getting its first office.

Chippendale was awarded the Cycling Media Legend award at the 2015 Cycling Media Awards. The following year, he was awarded 'Blogger of the Year' in the Cycling Media Awards.
