= Listed buildings in Todmorden (inner area) =

Todmorden is a market town and civil parish in the metropolitan borough of Calderdale, West Yorkshire, England. It contains over 300 listed buildings that are recorded in the National Heritage List for England. Of these, two are listed at Grade I, the highest of the three grades, eleven are at Grade II*, the middle grade, and the others are at Grade II, the lowest grade. This list contains the listed buildings in the town centre and those near the main roads leading from the centre, namely Burnley Road to the northwest, Halifax Road to the northeast, and Rochdale Road to the south, as far as its junction with Bacup Road. The listed buildings in the outer areas are in Listed buildings in Todmorden (outer areas).

Most of the listed buildings in the area are houses and associated structures, cottages, farmhouses and farm buildings. The Rochdale Canal runs through the area, and the listed buildings associated with this are bridges, locks, and a warehouse. The Manchester and Leeds Railway also runs through the area, and associated with this are viaducts and bridges. The other listed buildings include churches, chapels and a vicarage, public houses and hotels, shops and offices, public buildings, a pair of prehistoric standing stones, milestones, boundary stones, a former textile mill, schools, a statue, a model farm, a bandstand, and two war memorials.

== Key ==
| Grade | Criteria |
|---|---|
| I | Buildings of exceptional interest, sometimes considered to be internationally important |
| II* | Particularly important buildings of more than special interest |
| II | Buildings of national importance and special interest |

== Buildings ==
| Name and location | Photograph | Date | Notes | Grade |
|---|---|---|---|---|
| Two standing stones 53.70876°N 2.11480°W | | Prehistoric (possible) | The stones stand to the north and south of Stones Lane. Each stone has a square section, the stone to the north of the lane is about 12 feet (3.7 m) high, the other stone is smaller and more pointed. | II |
| High Barn; 53.71567°N 2.11128°W | — | Late 16th century | The end bay was later converted into a house. The barn is in stone with quoins, and a stone slate roof with coped gables and kneelers. It is aisled, and contains a segmental-arched cart entry. The house has a three-light mullioned window. | II |
| Royd Farmhouse; 53.72239°N 2.09792°W | — | Late 16th century | The house is in stone, and has a stone slate roof with coped gables and a crocketed finial. There are two storeys, and the house consists of a hall range and a cross-wing. The front has four bays, the left bay consisting of the cross-wing. In the second bay is a porch with a catslide roof, and a doorway with a moulded surround, composite jambs, and a moulded hood. The windows have chamfered mullions. | II |
| Carr House Farmhouse; 53.71937°N 2.08184°W | — | 1618 | The farmhouse is in stone and has a stone slate roof with coped gables and kneelers. There are two storeys, and the house consists of a four-bay hall range and two cross-wings. The windows have double chamfered mullions, some with hood moulds, and the central doorway has an arched and dated lintel. | II |
| Stansfield Hall; 53.71846°N 2.09130°W | — | 1640 | The house is in stone, with stone slate roofs. A large extension was added to the west in 1862, designed by John Gibson in Gothic Revival style. Only the cross-wing from the original house has survived, which contains a chamfered mullioned window. The extension has eight bays. Two bays project forward and are gabled, there is a full-height hall window with 15 lights, and all the windows are mullioned. In the left return is an entrance with a porte-cochère, and a doorway with a moulded surround and a Tudor arched head. Above is a decorated canted oriel window. | II* |
| Hall Stones Farmhouse; 53.72819°N 2.11358°W | — | 1647 | A stone farmhouse with quoins, and a stone slate roof with coped gables, moulded kneelers, and ball finials. There are two storeys and three bays. The windows have chamfered mullions, and the doorway on the front has monolithic jambs. In the right gable end is a doorway with a chamfered surround and a dated lintel. | II |
| Edge End Farmhouse and barn 53.71284°N 2.11337°W | — | Mid 17th century | The farmhouse and attached barn are in stone, with stone slate roofs that have coped gables. The house has two storeys, three bays, and a rear outshut under a catslide roof. On the front is a gabled porch with an arched lintel, and the windows have chamfered mullions. The barn to the left projects forward and has a crocketed finial. | II |
| Flail Croft; 53.72016°N 2.11709°W | — | Mid 17th century | The house is in stone on a plinth, and has a stone slate roof with coped gables and kneelers. There are two storeys, two bays, and a single-storey rear outshut. The windows have chamfered mullions, and in the right gable end is a gabled porch. | II |
| Hollins Farmhouse; 53.71965°N 2.09225°W | — | Mid 17th century | One bay remains of the original house, which was rebuilt with the addition of a square house in the 18th century. The house is in stone with quoins, a stone slate roof and two storeys. The windows are mullioned, and most of the mullions are double chamfered. | II |
| Lad Stones; 53.71986°N 2.06645°W | — | Mid 17th century | The house, which was extended in the 18th century, is in stone with a stone slate roof. The house has two storeys, and consists of a hall range, a gabled cross-wing on the left, and a rear outshut. In the cross-wing is a doorway with a pointed head and a chamfered surround, and at the eastern end is a two-storey porch with a depressed-arched lintel. The windows have double chamfered mullions, and some have hood moulds. | II |
| Kilnhurst Farmhouse and Kilnhurst House; 53.71203°N 2.08346°W | — | Mid 17th century | The farmhouse is the older, the house dating from later in the century, and both have been extended. The house is to the left, and the farmhouse projects forward on the right. They are in stone and have stone slate roofs with coped gables, and each has two storeys. The windows have chamfered mullions and a continuous hood mould over the ground floor windows. The farmhouse has a large doorway with monolithic jambs and a chamfered surround. The house has an extension with a semicircular-arched taking-in door with a dated keystone. At the rear of the house is a gabled open porch with seats, and a doorway with a chamfered surround and an inscribed lintel. | II |
| Cottage east of Lad Stones; 53.71996°N 2.06626°W | — | Mid 17th century | The building is in stone with quoins and a stone slate roof. There are two storeys, and on the front is a gabled porch. The windows are mullioned, and some have hood moulds. In the left return is a doorway with a pointed head. | II |
| Scaitcliffe Hall; 53.72267°N 2.11352°W | — | 1666 | A rear range was added to the house in about 1738, a further block was added in 1802, the house was remodelled and extended in about 1833, and all was linked in 1835. The house is in stone and has a hipped roof of stone slate and slate. There are two storeys and front of four bays. The windows on the front are mullioned, and in the third bay is a porch with a Tudor arched doorway, flanked by octagonal turrets, and with an embattled parapet. Attached to the left end is an arbour with Tuscan columns and a dated entablature, and beyond this is an embattled octagonal tower. Attached to this is a link to the block that was formerly detached. | II |
| 1, 2 and 3 North Scaitcliffe; 53.72320°N 2.11389°W | — | Late 17th century | A house, divided into three, in stone with a roof of slate at the front and stone slate at the rear. There are two storeys, each house has one bay, and the windows have chamfered mullions, some with hood moulds. The middle house has a gabled porch with a finial, and the doorway has a chamfered surround and a square lintel. The other doorways have monolithic jambs. | II |
| Haugh House, Haugh Cottage and Haugh Farmhouse; 53.71678°N 2.06810°W | — | Late 17th century | A group consisting of a 17th-century house, an 18th-century house, and a 19th-century block, all in stone with stone slate roofs. The 18th-century house has two storeys, an attic and cellars, and three bays. It contains quoins, a doorway with Doric pilasters, a fanlight, an entablature, and a pediment. Above it is a semicircular-headed window, and it is flanked by Venetian windows. Attached to the right is the 19th-century block, which has three storeys and two bays, and contains mullioned windows. At the rear is the 17th-century house which has two storeys, and consists of a hall and a cross-wing. It contains chamfered mullioned window and has a doorway with monolithic jambs. | II |
| Barn southeast of Pex House; 53.70816°N 2.10907°W | — | Late 17th century | A stone barn with quoins and a stone slate roof. There are three bays, and the barn contains an arched cart entry with composite jambs, over which is a square window, and a low doorway. | II |
| Barn, Todmorden Edge South; 53.71657°N 2.11650°W | — | Late 17th century | The barn is in stone and has a stone slate roof with coped gables and kneelers. It is a wide barn with three bays. It contains a square-headed cart entry, and in the west gable end is a pitching hole with an initialled lintel. | II |
| Todmorden Edge South; 53.71635°N 2.11620°W | — | 1697 | The house is in stone and has a stone slate roof with coped gables and kneelers, and two storeys. On the front is a gabled porch with a doorway that has a moulded surround and a dated lintel. The windows are mullioned, some with transoms. | II |
| Todmorden Hall; 53.71316°N 2.09923°W | | 1703 | The house, which incorporates timber framing dating from about 1500, is in stone, and has a stone slate roof with coped gables, parapets between the gables, and finials. There are two storeys and attics, and a front of five gabled bays, with later extensions at the ends. All the windows have chamfered and moulded mullions and transoms, and in the attics are dormers with finials. Above all the windows are hood moulds, and the left bay has a lantern finial. In the second bay is a gabled two-storey porch and a doorway with a moulded surround and a depressed-arched lintel with a carved coat of arms. The storey above the doorway is jettied. | II* |
| 5 and 6 Castle Lane; 53.71915°N 2.07819°W | — | Early 18th century | A house, later divided into two, it is in stone with quoins, and a stone slate roof. There are two storeys and two bays. The doorway has monolithic jambs, the windows have double chamfered mullions, and above the ground floor windows is a continuous hood mould. | II |
| 26 and 28 Doghouse Lane; 53.71481°N 2.09941°W | — | Early 18th century | A house, later divided into two, it is in stone with quoins and a stone slate roof. There are two storeys, a double-depth plan, and two bays. The doorways have monolithic jambs, and in the windows are double chamfered mullions. | II |
| Building by 3 North Scaitcliffe; 53.72309°N 2.11391°W | — | Early 18th century | The building is in stone with quoins and a stone slate roof. There are two storeys, the windows have chamfered mullions, and on the right side are external stone steps leading up to a doorway. | II |
| Bridge No. 26, Lobb Mill Bridge; 53.71797°N 2.07111°W | | Early 18th century | The bridge carries Haugh Road over the Rochdale Canal. It is in stone and consists of a single horseshoe elliptical arch. The bridge has a parapet and a band, and the roadway slopes from south to north. | II |
| Burnt House; 53.71851°N 2.08663°W | — | Early 18th century | A row of houses extended in the 19th century by two to make six. They are in stone with quoins, and a stone slate roof. There are two storeys, a double-depth plan, and six bays. In the second bay is a blocked semicircular-headed cart entry. The windows are mullioned, some with double chamfered mullions. | II |
| Frieldhurst Farmhouse and Frieldhurst Cottage; 53.73287°N 2.13268°W | — | Early 18th century | A house, later divided into two, it is in stone with quoins, and has a roof of slate at the front, and stone slate at the rear. There are two storeys, two bays, a single-storey gabled extension, and a rear lean-to. The windows are mullioned. | II |
| Barn southeast of Frieldhurst Farmhouse; 53.73267°N 2.13241°W | — | Early 18th century | The barn is in stone with quoins and a stone slate roof, and is half-aisled. The openings have chamfered surrounds, the doorways have quoined lintels, one of which is inscribed, there are two cart entries, one with a square head, and the other with a segmental head, and the windows are mullioned. | II |
| Kilnhurst Cottage; 53.71203°N 2.08280°W | — | Early 18th century | A pair of cottages combined into one, it is in stone with quoins on the north front, and a stone slate roof. There are two storeys, four bays, and a single-storey outshut to the south. The two doorways have deep lintels, and the windows have chamfered mullions. | II |
| Millbrook House, Laneside House and Waterside House West and South; 53.70900°N 2.10227°W | — | Early 18th century | A row of four houses, some of which were added in the 19th century. They are in stone, one has a slate roof, and the other roofs are in stone slate. At the left hand is a range with three storeys and seven bays, to the right is Waterside House, which has two storeys and three bays, and an added bay with a semi-octagonal bay window at the end. At the rear is an early two-storey textile factory. | II |
| Field Barn for Lower Hanging Shaw; 53.71775°N 2.14074°W | — | Early 18th century | The barn is in stone with quoins, and a stone slate roof with kneelers on the right gable. In the south front is a segmental-arched cart entry with composite jambs and a chamfered surround. At the right end is an inserted doorway with monolithic jambs. The rear contains a square-headed cart entry with a monolithic lintel, and a doorway with composite jambs and a heavy lintel. | II |
| Lower Laithe House, Lower Laithe West, and Lower Laithe Cottage; 53.71630°N 2.08699°W | — | Early 18th century | A group of three dwellings, including a 19th-century house. The house is in stone with quoins, a sill band, an eaves cornice, and a hipped stone slate roof. There are two storeys and three bays, a doorway with an architrave and a segmental pediment, and sash windows. The fourth bay is the cottage that has quoins and mullioned windows, a blocked taking-in door, and a Venetian window. | II |
| Stannally; 53.72820°N 2.11357°W | — | Early 18th century | A stone house with a stone slate roof, two storeys, and three bays. Steps lead up to a gabled porch that has a doorway with monolithic jambs. The windows have chamfered mullions. | II |
| The Sourhall; 53.71869°N 2.12620°W | — | Early 18th century | A house, at one time a public house, it was extended at both ends in the 19th century. It is in stone with quoins and a stone slate roof. There are two storeys and four bays. On the front is a gabled porch, and the windows have chamfered mullions. | II |
| Stones Farmhouse and barn 53.70877°N 2.11360°W | — | 1743 | A house was added to the farmhouse and barn in the 19th century. The buildings are in stone with quoins and stone slate roofs. The house has a plinth, two storeys, a chamfered doorway with monolithic jambs, and some of the windows have chamfered mullions. The barn is at right angles and has a semicircular cart entry with a dated keystone, and chamfered vents, and to the left is a stable. Projecting forward is the farmhouse that has coped gables, two storeys and two bays, a gabled porch with decorative bargeboards, and mullioned windows with sashes. | II |
| Stones House; 53.70878°N 2.11396°W | — | 1746 | The house, at one time a Quaker meeting house, is in stone on a moulded plinth, with quoins, a band, moulded gutter brackets, a cornice, and a stone slate roof. There are two storeys and a symmetrical front of seven bays. In the centre is a semicircular porch, and a doorway with pilasters, a moulded cornice, and a lead roof. Above it is an inscribed datestone, and the windows are sashes with architraves and keystones. In the left return is a doorway with a projecting chamfered surround, above which is a semicircular-arched window. On the right return is a round-arched doorway with a hood on detached Tuscan columns, and at the rear is a stair window. | II |
| 13 Pleasant View; 53.71492°N 2.09900°W | — | Mid 18th century | A stone house with quoins and a stone slate roof. There are two storeys and two bays. On the front are chamferd mullioned windows, and an inserted doorway, the original doorway with a heavy lintel and composite jambs being blocked. At the rear is a doorway with monolithic jambs, a mullioned window in the ground floor, and sash windows above. | II |
| Moor Hey Farmhouse and barn 53.71587°N 2.12825°W | — | Mid 18th century | The farmhouse was extended and the barn was added in the 19th century. The buildings are in stone with quoins and stone slate roofs. The house has two storeys and three bays, and most of the windows have chamfered mullions. The barn is higher, it has a circular cart entry, a doorway with a slightly chamfered surround, and a blocked circular vent. | II |
| Pex House; 53.70833°N 2.10936°W | — | Mid 18th century | A stone house, rendered on the right side, with a stone slate roof. There are two storeys at the front, one at the rear, three bays, and a rear outshut. The doorway has monolithic jambs, and the windows are mullioned, most with double chamfered mullions. | II |
| Rawson Field; 53.72385°N 2.10784°W | — | Mid 18th century | Originally the house of a laithe house, it is in stone with quoins and a stone slate roof. There are two storeys, two bays, and a single-storey extension on the left. The inserted doorway has monolithic jambs, and the windows have double chamfered mullions. | II |
| Stile House; 53.72267°N 2.10150°W | — | Mid 18th century | The house is in stone with quoins and a stone slate roof. There are two storeys and two bays. The doorway has monolithic jambs, and all the windows have double chamfered mullions. | II |
| Gate piers north of Stones Farmhouse; 53.70889°N 2.11319°W | — | Mid 18th century | The gate piers are in stone and have a square plan. On each face of each pier is a Tuscan pilaster and a section of entablature. A cornice projects over each pilaster. | II |
| Plunge bath, Stones House; 53.70840°N 2.11419°W | — | Mid 18th century | The plunge bath is in the grounds of the house. It is in stone with a rectangular plan and retaining walls. Steps lead down to a well. | II |
| The Golden Lion Hotel; 53.71213°N 2.09866°W | | Mid 18th century | A public house that was extended in the 19th century, it is in stone, rendered on the front, on a plinth, with quoins, a band, an eaves band, a moulded cornice, and a stone slate roof. There are two storeys and an attic, and four bays, with an added bay to the right. The doorway in the second bay has a semicircular head, and a hood on consoles, and above it is a semicircular-arched window with imposts and a keystone. The third bay has a mullioned window with chamfered jambs, and the other bays contain sash windows. On the front is a carved tablet containing a lion rampant. The three-bay left return has a Venetian window in the gable apex, and at the rear is an extension with a slate roof. | II |
| The Rose and Crown Public House; 53.71794°N 2.07525°W | | Mid 18th century | The public house is in stone with quoins and a stone slate roof. There are two storeys, a double-pile plan, and a front of three bays. The windows have double chamfered mullions. | II |
| West Rodwell End; 53.72072°N 2.06570°W | — | Mid 18th century | A pair of stone cottages with one storey and an attic, two bays, and low rear outshuts. They have chamfered mullioned windows and eaves dormers. | II |
| Woodhouse; 53.71503°N 2.07579°W | — | Mid 18th century | A cottage, with further cottages added to each end in the 19th century and combined into one house, it is in stone with quoins, and a stone slate roof. There are two storeys, and outshuts at both ends. The windows are mullioned, and the two doorways have monolithic jambs. | II |
| Lower Stoodley Farmhouse, Hall and Cottages; 53.72098°N 2.05458°W | — | Mid to late 18th century | A group of buildings forming four dwellings, they are in stone with stone slate roofs. Most have two storeys, with some single-storey wings. Most of the windows are mullioned, and other features include a Gothic window, coped gables, a doorway with an architrave and cornice, and an oculus. | II |
| St Mary's Church; 53.71371°N 2.09823°W | | 1770 | The chancel was added in 1896 by J. Medland Taylor. The church is in stone with a stone slate roof, and consists of a nave, a south porch, a chancel, and a west tower. The tower has three stages, and has clock faces, an embattled parapet and a weathervane. Along the sides of the nave are two tiers of windows, including two sets of Venetian windows. Inside the church is a west gallery. | II |
| 1 and 3 Oak Hill Clough; 53.72144°N 2.09489°W | — | Late 18th century | Originally four back to back houses, later combined into two, they are in stone with quoins and a stone slate roof. There are three storeys, a double-pile plan, and each house has two bays. On the front are mullioned windows containing sashes, in the left return is a blocked taking-in door, and in the right return are sash windows. | II |
| Bridge No 24, Stoodley Bridge; 53.72172°N 2.05703°W | | Late 18th century | The bridge carries Stoodley Lane over the Rochdale Canal. It is in stone, and consists of a single horseshoe elliptical arch. The bridge has rusticated voussoirs, a band, a parapet with thin flag cappings, and projecting piers. | II |
| Bridge No 25, Shaw Wood Bridge; 53.71877°N 2.06279°W | | Late 18th century | The bridge carries Shaw Wood Road over the Rochdale Canal. It is in stone, and consists of a single segmental arch. The bridge has rusticated voussoirs, a band, and a parapet which curves to square buttresses. | II |
| Bridge No 27, Woodhouse Mill Bridge; 53.71637°N 2.07526°W | | Late 18th century | The bridge carries Woodhouse Road over the Rochdale Canal. It is in stone, and consists of a single horseshoe arch. The bridge has rusticated voussoirs, a curving band, and a parapet with cappings. | II |
| Bridge No 28, Kilnhurst Bridge; 53.71376°N 2.08652°W | | Late 18th century | The bridge carries Key Syke Lane over the Rochdale Canal. It is in stone, and consists of a single horseshoe elliptical arch. The bridge has a band, a parapet with cappings, and square buttressed ends. | II |
| Bridge No 29, Baltimore Bridge; 53.71343°N 2.09163°W | | Late 18th century | The bridge carries Stack Hills Road over the Rochdale Canal. It is in stone, and consists of a single horseshoe elliptical arch. The bridge has rusticated voussoirs, a band and a parapet with cappings. | II |
| Bridge No 30a 53.71074°N 2.10258°W | | Late 18th century | The bridge carries a road over the Rochdale Canal. It is in stone and consists of a single horseshoe elliptical arch. The bridge has rusticated voussoirs, a band and a parapet with cappings. | II |
| Gauxholme Canal Warehouse; 53.70398°N 2.10905°W | | Late 18th century | The former warehouse is by the Rochdale Canal. It is in stone with quoins, a band, and a slate roof with coped gables. There are two storeys and an attic. The front facing the canal is symmetrical with three bays, a semicircular entry to the canal, windows with plain surrounds, and a Venetian window in the gable apex. The return has five bays, similar windows and a segmental-arched doorway. | II |
| Hare and Hounds Inn; 53.72176°N 2.10769°W | | Late 18th century | The public house is in stone with quoins, a cornice, a parapet, and a stone slate roof. There are two storeys and five bays. On the front is a gabled porch, and a doorway with monolithic jambs. The windows have double chamfered mullions. | II |
| Horsfall Farmhouse and barn 53.71910°N 2.06936°W | — | Late 18th century | A laithe house in stone with quoins and a stone slate roof. The house is at the right, it has two storeys and one bay, and to its right is a single-storey extension. Both parts contain three-light stepped windows. The barn to the left has a large semicircular cart entry and a Venetian window above. In the left return are square-headed vents, and a round headed window, above which is a dovecote, and an owl hole in the gable apex. | II |
| Lock No. 16, Lobb Mill Lock; 53.71798°N 2.07080°W | | Late 18th century | The lock on the Rochdale Canal has brick retaining walls with blue brick headers, quoins, massive stone cappings, and rebates for gates. | II |
| Lock No. 17, Old Royd Lock and retaining wall 53.71502°N 2.07970°W | | Late 18th century | The lock on the Rochdale Canal and its overflow channel are in stone with massive cappings. | II |
| Lock No. 18, Shop Lock; 53.71312°N 2.09591°W | | Late 18th century | The lock on the Rochdale Canal is in stone and has rebates for the gates. | II |
| Lock No. 19, Todmorden Lock; 53.71252°N 2.09891°W | | Late 18th century | The lock on the Rochdale Canal is in large dressed stones and has rebates for the gates. | II |
| Lower Hanging Shaw; 53.71429°N 2.14266°W | — | Late 18th century | A laithe house that was extended at each end in about 1840. It is in stone with quoins and a stone slate roof. The house has two storeys, a double-pile plan, a doorway with monolithic jambs, and mullioned windows. The barn to the left has a semicircular-arched cart entry between buttresses. | II |
| Milestone north of Lock No. 19; 53.71252°N 2.09875°W | — | Late 18th century | The milestone is on the towpath of the Rochdale Canal. It is a small arched stone, and has inscriptions indicating the distances to Sowerby Bridge and Manchester. | II |
| Royal George Inn; 53.71324°N 2.09792°W | — | Late 18th century | A public house and attached shops, they are in stone with a band, and a stone slate roof. The front facing Water Street has three storeys and four bays, and contains mullioned windows. The front facing Rochdale Road has been altered. | II |
| Horsfall House; 53.71917°N 2.06979°W | — | 1777 | A stone house with rusticated quoins, a modillioned cornice, and a stone slate roof with coped gables. There are two storeys, a double-pile plan, and two bays. The doorway has monolithic jambs, a pulvinated frieze, and a triangular pediment with the date in the tympanum. Above it is a sash window, in the left return is a Venetian window, and the other windows have double chamfered mullions. | II |
| Lock No. 14, Holmcoat Bridge Lock; 53.72422°N 2.05449°W | | 1798 | The lock on the Rochdale Canal has massive stone block with cappings, and has rebates for the gates. | II |
| Lock No. 15, Shawplains Lock; 53.71872°N 2.06304°W | | 1798 | The lock on the Rochdale Canal has large dressed stone retaining walls and rebates for gates. | II |
| Lock No. 20, Wadsworth Mill Lock; 53.70840°N 2.10416°W | cemtre | 1798 | The lock on the Rochdale Canal has large dressed stone retaining walls and rebates for gates. The northern end is fitted with two rebates for a double set of bottom gates. | II |
| Lock No. 21, Shade Lock; 53.70704°N 2.10553°W | | 1798 | The lock on the Rochdale Canal has large dressed stone retaining walls with rebates for gates. | II |
| Lock No. 22, Gauxholme Lowest Lock; 53.70544°N 2.10808°W | | 1798 | The lock on the Rochdale Canal has large dressed stone retaining walls with rebates for gates. It is fitted with the facility for a double set of bottom gates. | II |
| Lock No. 23, Gauxholme Middle Lock; 53.70544°N 2.10808°W | | 1798 | The lock on the Rochdale Canal is in stone and has rebates for the gates. It is fitted with the facility for a double set of bottom gates. | II |
| Lock No. 24, Gauxholme Highest Lock; 53.70426°N 2.10874°W | | 1798 | The lock on the Rochdale Canal has large dressed stone retaining walls with rebates for gates. It is fitted with the facility for a double set of bottom gates. | II |
| Pex Place; 53.70453°N 2.10902°W | — | 1804 | Originally a poorhouse, later a house and a works, it is in stone with quoins and a stone slate roof. There are three storeys and an attic, and the gable end that faces the road has three bays. The doorway has a raised lintel, and the windows are mullioned. | II |
| 11 Cross Stone Road; 53.72014°N 2.08186°W | | 1805 | A Sunday school, later a private house, it is in stone with quoins, a band, and a stone slate roof with coped gables and kneelers. There are two storeys on the north front, three on the south front, and three bays. Most of the window have chamfered mullions, and there are Venetian windows with moulded imposts and keystones in the left gable end. Also in the left gable end steps lead up to an upper floor doorway, and on the north front is an inscribed tablet. | II |
| Barn, Scaitcliffe Hall; 53.72258°N 2.11394°W | — | 1809 | The barn is in stone with quoins and a stone slate roof. There are two storeys and an attic, and the gable ends have three bays, each gable with a pitching hole. The barn contains two semicircular cart entries above which are semicircular-headed windows with impost blocks and keystones. All the windows have small panes, and one has an inscribed and dated lintel. | II |
| 3 and 5 Castle Grove; 53.71710°N 2.08000°W | — | 1816 | A house later divided into two dwellings, it is in stone, and has a stone slate roof with a coped gable to the south. The windows are mullioned, and at the rear is a round-headed entry with a keystone and an inserted door. | II |
| Former Unitarian Chapel and Sunday School; 53.71194°N 2.09771°W | — | 1822–24 | A cross-wing was added in 1899, and the chapel was later used for other purposes. It is in stone with chamfered rusticated quoins, and a slate roof. There is one storey to the road and five bays, two storeys to the valley, with the Sunday school in the lower storey, and the gabled cross-wing has three storeys. Over the entrance to the Sunday school is a triple keystone, above which is an inscribed tablet. | II |
| 39–45 Blind Lane; 53.71868°N 2.09902°W | — | Early 19th century | A row of four stone cottages with brick in the gables, partly rendered at the rear, and with quoins, and a stone slate roof. There are two storeys, a double-pile plan, and four bays. Each cottage has a doorway and mullioned windows. | II |
| 11 Burnley Road; 53.71411°N 2.09778°W | | Early 19th century | A bank, later offices, on a curved corner site, the building is in stone, the ground floor is rusticated and vermiculated, and it has a band, a cornice, a parapet, and a slate roof. There are three storeys and four bays on Burnley Road, two storeys and two bays on Ridge Road, and a curved bay flanked by pilasters with three storeys between. In the ground floor in Burnley Road are shop fronts, and the windows are sashes; those in the corner bay are curved. In Ridge Road are two further bays, each with a round-headed doorway approached by steps with railings, both with a triangular pediment on consoles, and a tall round-headed window. | II |
| 106–116 Burnley Road; 53.71898°N 2.10213°W | | Early 19th century | A row of six cottages, they are in stone, and have quoins and a stone slate roof. There are two storeys, and each cottage has one bay. Some cottages have porches, and the windows, once mullioned, are modern replacements. | II |
| 195–209 Rochdale Road; 53.70706°N 2.10364°W | — | Early 19th century | A row of eight stone cottages with quoins, a projecting eaves string course, and a stone slate roof. There are two storeys and eight bays. Each cottage has a doorway. and a five-light mullioned window in each floor. In front of each cottage steps lead up to a balcony with cast iron railings. | II |
| Factory/warehouse, 2 Oxford Street; 53.71295°N 2.09745°W | — | Early 19th century | The building is in stone with a stone slate roof. There are three storeys, the gable end faces the street, and along the sides are nine bays. In the gable end the ground floor contains a shop window and doorway, and above are small-paned windows. Along the sides are sash windows and blocked taking-in doors. | II |
| Dawson Weir House; 53.71078°N 2.10222°W | — | Early 19th century | A stone house with quoins and a slate roof, hipped to the right. There are three storeys and a symmetrical front of thee bays. The central round-arched doorway has pilasters, a fanlight and an open pediment. The windows on the front are sashes, at the rear are mullioned stepped windows, and in the right return is a stair window. | II |
| Ewood Hall; 53.71913°N 2.11075°W | — | Early 19th century | A stone house with an eaves cornice and a hipped slate roof. There are two storeys and three bays, the outer bays projecting. In the centre is an open porch with pilasters and a balustrade, and the windows are sashes. | II |
| Former Fountain public house and two cottages 53.71975°N 2.09512°W | — | Early 19th century | The building is in stone on a plinth, with quoins and a stone slate roof. There are two storeys and an attic, and the south front is symmetrical with three bays. The central doorway has monolithic jambs, a moulded surround, and a pediment. It is flanked by sash windows, and above it is a Venetian window. In the left return are three bays, the rear two bays are cottages with mullioned windows. | II |
| Harley House and Harley Cottage; 53.71854°N 2.09836°W | — | Early 19th century | A pair of houses in stone with plinths, quoins and slate roofs. Harley Cottage faces south and has three storeys and two bays, and Harley House faces east, it has two storeys and an attic, three bays, and a pedimented gable containing Venetian windows. In both houses the other windows are sashes, and each house has a doorway with monolithic jambs, a moulded edge, a convex cornice, and a pediment. | II |
| Kirk Head; 53.72011°N 2.08370°W | — | Early 19th century | Three stone cottages with quoins and a stone slate roof. There are two storeys, a double depth-plan, a front of two bays, and a rear outshut. The windows are mullioned. | II |
| Barn north of Lad Stones; 53.72019°N 2.06646°W | — | Early 19th century | The barn is in stone, on a plinth, and has quoins, and a stone slate roof with coped gables and kneelers. There are four bays, and it contains opposing cart entries with quoined jambs, and doorways with chamfered surrounds. The north gable has a circular pitching hole, and in the south gable is a circular window. | II |
| Milestone near entrance to Scaitcliffe Hall; 53.72365°N 2.11274°W | | Early 19th century | The milestone is on the southwest side of Burnley Road (A646 road). The stone has an arched head, and is inscribed with pointing hands and the distances to Todmorden and to Burnley. | II |
| Milestone by the Rose and Crown public house 53.71777°N 2.07504°W | | Early 19th century | The milestone is on the north side of Halifax Road (A646 road). The stone has an arched head, and is inscribed with pointing hands and the distances to Todmorden and to Halifax. | II |
| Todmorden Edge North; 53.71707°N 2.11661°W | — | Early 19th century | A stone house with a stone slate roof, two storeys, two bays, and a single-storey rear outshut. The windows are mullioned and between them is an open wooden porch. | II |
| Weavers Arms public house 53.71859°N 2.10080°W | | Early 19th century | The public house is in stone with quoins and a stone slate roof. There are two storeys and two bays. The two doorways have monolithic jambs, and the windows have three lights and are mullioned. | II |
| 1 White Hart Fold; 53.71392°N 2.09808°W | — | c. 1830 | A shop with a house above, it is in stone with raised rusticated quoins, and has a stone slate roof with a triangular pedimented gable containing a blind lunette. There are three storeys and two bays. The ground floor contains a projecting shop front. In the middle floor is a balcony and a doorway with monolithic jambs. The windows in the upper floors are sashes, and on the left return is a cantilevered staircase to the doorway in the middle floor. | II |
| Todmorden Vicarage; 53.71613°N 2.09943°W | — | c. 1830 | The vicarage to Christ Church is in stone on a plinth, with an eaves string course, bracketed gutters, and a hipped slate roof. It is in Gothic Revival style, and has two storeys and a symmetrical front of three bays. On the front is a porch with a pierced balustrade. The doorway and windows have four-centred arches and fanlights with Gothic glazing. The windows are sashes, and have hood moulds. | II |
| Woodhouse Bridge and walls 53.71665°N 2.07553°W | | 1830 | The bridge carries Woodhouse Road over the River Calder. It is in stone and consists of a single semicircular arch, and there is a land arch to the north. The bridge has rusticated voussoirs, raised dated keystones and a parapet. It is flanked by retaining walls with buttresses. | II |
| Christ Church; 53.71621°N 2.10002°W | | 1832 | A Commissioners' Church that was designed by Lewis Vulliamy in Early English style, the chancel was added in 1885–86. The church is in stone with a slate roof, and consists of a nave with a clerestory, a north porch, a chancel, and a west tower. The tower has three stages, clasping buttresses, a west door with a pointed arch, a clock face on the west, and an embattled pinnacle with corner pinnacles. The windows in the body of the church are lancets. | II |
| Woodhouse Mill, engine house and chimney 53.71625°N 2.07684°W | | 1832 | The mill is in stone with a stone slate roof, five storeys, and ten bays. There is a pediment over three of the bays, and the middle of these bays contains three taking-in doors. The windows have small panes, and at the right end is a stair tower. At the rear is a two-storey engine house and a former office; it contains a tall semicircular-arched window. Detached from the mill is a tapering circular chimney on a square base with a moulded cornice, and at its top is a ringed cap. | II* |
| St Paul's Church; 53.72010°N 2.08233°W | | 1833–35 | A Commissioners' Church, now redundant, it is built in stone, and has a slate roof. The church consists of a nave without a chancel, two gabled porches at the east end, and a west tower. The tower has four stages, an embattled parapet, and angle buttresses which rise to crocketed pinnacles. The windows are lancets, and the east window has three stepped lancets. | II |
| 29 Rochdale Road; 53.71268°N 2.09819°W | | Early to mid 19th century (probable) | A house that was converted into a Co-operative shop in the early 20th century, and has since been used for other purposes. It is in stone, and has three storeys at the front, four at the rear, and a front of two bays. The two-storey shop front has a recessed central entrance. It contains slender cast iron mullions, above the windows and doorway are curved and circular timber mouldings, and over these is a fascia with a gilded inscription. The upper floor of the shop front contains four display windows with slender mullions, and a plain fascia above, and in the top floor are two sash windows. | II |
| Gauxholme Railway Bridge; 53.70639°N 2.10660°W | | 1840 | The bridge was built by the Manchester and Leeds Railway to carry its line over the Rochdale Canal, and was designed by George Stephenson. At the ends are stone semi-octagonal towers, each with a moulded band, false machicolations, and an embattled parapet. The original bridge is in cast iron and has a segmental arch. In the 20th century a square sectional steel bridge was set within the original bridge. | II |
| Gauxholme Viaduct; 53.70324°N 2.10767°W | | 1840 | The viaduct was built by the Manchester and Leeds Railway to carry its line over the Rochdale Canal, and was designed by George Stephenson. It is in stone and consists of 17 segmental arches with rusticated voussoirs. The viaduct has a moulded impost on tapering piers, a moulded band, and a parapet. Over Bacup Road it has a buttress and a curving ramped wall. | II |
| Lob Mill Viaduct; 53.71856°N 2.07105°W | | 1840 | The viaduct was built by the Manchester and Leeds Railway and was designed by George Stephenson. It is in stone and consists of five segmental arches. The piers taper and have a moulded impost. The viaduct has a band, a cornice and a parapet. | II |
| North View, Huddersfield Road; 53.71359°N 2.09471°W | — | c. 1840 | A stone house on a plinth, with quoins, a cornice, and a hipped slate roof. There are two storeys and a symmetrical front of three bays. In the centre is a porch with Ionic columns distyle in antis, and the windows are sashes with architraves. | II |
| Queen Hotel; 53.71377°N 2.09906°W | | c. 1840 | The hotel, built to serve the railway station, is in stone on a plinth, with quoins, a belt course, and a hipped slate roof. At the front there are two storeys and a curved frontage of five bays following the line of the road, and at the rear are three storeys and six bays. The current doorway has a cornice, and the original main doorway, which is blocked, has an architrave and a cornice on consoles. The windows are sashes. | II |
| Todmorden Working Men's Social Club; 53.71363°N 2.09436°W | | c. 1840 | The building is in stone on a plinth, with quoins, a cornice, and a hipped slate roof. There are two storeys and a symmetrical front of three bays. In the centre is a porch with Ionic columns distyle in antis. The windows in the ground floor are sashes, and in the upper floor they are casements. | II |
| Todmorden Viaduct; 53.71497°N 2.09705°W | | c. 1840 | The viaduct was built by the Manchester and Leeds Railway to carry its line over the Burnley Road, and was designed by George Stephenson. It is in stone, and consists of seven segmental arches. The viaduct has a moulded impost band, a cornice, a parapet, tapering piers, and buttresses. Beyond the southern buttress are two land arches. | II |
| Coach House, Scaitcliffe Hall; 53.72278°N 2.11418°W | — | 1850 | The coach house is in stone with quoins, a stone slate roof, and two storeys. It contains four arched carriage entrances with chamfered surrounds and keystones each with a number spelling out the date. There is another arched doorway in the upper storey, and the windows have two lights and horizontal sashes. | II |
| 1, 3, 5 and 7 Fielden Terrace; 53.71960°N 2.09567°W | — | Mid 19th century | A terrace of four stone houses that have a slate roof with coped gables. There are two storeys and attics, and each house has one bay. Each house has a doorway with a chamfered surround, composite jambs, and a depressed Tudor arched lintel, windows with double chamfered mullions, and a gabled dormer. | II |
| Lydgate Viaduct; 53.72766°N 2.12220°W | | Mid 19th century | The viaduct carries a railway over a valley, it is in stone, and consists of 13 semicircular arches with voussoirs. The piers are slender and have imposts, there is a band over the arches, splayed buttresses, and a parapet with cappings. | II |
| Milestone at NGR SD 964253; 53.72488°N 2.05591°W | | Mid 19th century | The milestone is on the west side of Halifax Road (A464 road). It is an upright stone with two chamfered faces inscribed with the distances to Todmorden and Halifax. | II |
| Milestone north of 606 Burnley Road; 53.73064°N 2.13107°W | | Mid 19th century | The milestone is on the east side of the A646 road. It has an arched head and is inscribed with pointing hands and the distances to Todmorden and Burnley. | II |
| Gate piers and wall, Stansfield Hall; 53.71868°N 2.09247°W | — | Mid 19th century | The gate piers at the entrance to the drive are in stone with a square plan. At the bottom is a cornice on a plinth, and at the top is an embattled cornice with a leaf pattern, and a four-stage embattled pyramidal top. Attached to the piers are walls on a plinth and with Gothic capping. | II |
| Nursery Cottage, Stansfield Hall; 53.71851°N 2.09019°W | — | Mid 19th century | A stone house with quoins, and a two-span stone slate roof with coped gables. There are two storeys, a double-depth plan, a symmetrical front with two gabled bays, and a rear outshut. In the centre is a gabled porch with a depressed Tudor arched lintel, an impost, and ball finials. The windows have chamfered mullions and hood moulds. | II |
| The Endowed School; 53.71383°N 2.09815°W | — | 1851 | The school was rebuilt, having been founded in 1713. It is in stone with a stone slate roof, two storeys, and two bays. The doorways have chamfered surrounds and arched lintels, the windows have chamfered mullions, and above one doorway is an inscribed stone. | II |
| Todmorden Unitarian Church; 53.71120°N 2.09902°W | | 1865–69 | The church, designed by John Gibson in Decorated style, is in stone with a slate roof. It consists of a nave, aisles, transepts, a chancel with a vestry, a porch, and a steeple. The steeple has a tower with three stages, angle buttresses, and corner pinnacles linked to a spire with lucarnes. | I |
| Former stables, Dobroyd Castle; 53.71117°N 2.10856°W | | 1865 | The stables, later used for other purposes, were designed by John Gibson. The building is in stone with a felt roof. There are seven symmetrical bays, the middle three projecting forward and containing a semicircular entrance to a courtyard. Above this is a corbel table and an embattled parapet, the middle bay riding to form a square tower with a blocked circular opening, false machicolation, and a weathervane. The outer bays contain lunettes. | II |
| Lodge and piers, Dobroyd Castle; 53.70810°N 2.10704°W | | c. 1865 | The lodge is in stone, it has an irregular plan, one storey and an attic, and an embattled parapet. The entrance piers are square and have embattled tops. | II |
| Dobroyd Castle; 53.71044°N 2.10805°W | | 1866–69 | A country house in the form of a castle designed by John Gibson. It is in local stone, on a plinth, with string courses, and embattled parapets. There are two storeys, an entrance porch of four storeys, a front of nine bays, with three bays on the sides, a turret at each corner, and a rear service wing. On the entrance tower is a two-storey porch with a corner turret, and the windows are all sashes. | II* |
| Unitarian Lodge; 53.71159°N 2.09922°W | — | c. 1868 | The lodge is in stone, and has a slate roof with coped gables and finials. It is in Gothic style, and has a single storey and a T-shaped plan. On the front is a projecting gabled wing, and in the angle is a gabled porch. | II |
| The Fielden Statue; 53.71797°N 2.10546°W | — | 1869 | The statue commemorates John Fielden, and stands in Centre Vale Park, having been moved from elsewhere. It is by J. H. Foley, and is in bronze on a granite plinth. The statue depicts a standing figure holding a document, and on the plinth are inscribed his dates of birth and death. | II |
| 39–49 Halifax Road; 53.71414°N 2.09381°W | | c. 1870 | A row of stone shops with a cornice, a slate roof. and three storeys. The shops are in Gothic Revival style, and the fronts in the ground floor are divided by pilasters. In the middle floor the windows have semicircular heads and banded voussoirs, and the windows in the top floor have segmental heads and colonnettes. | II |
| Masonic Hall; 53.71398°N 2.09816°W | | c. 1870 | The hall is in stone on a plinth, and has a rusticated ground floor, rusticated quoins, a cornice, a band, a parapet with an oversailing modillioned cornice, and a slate roof. There are two storeys and a symmetrical front of three bays. The central doorway has a segmental arch, an architrave, carved spandrels, and a keystone carved with a star of David. The windows have segmental heads, in the ground floor with false voussoirs and keystones, and in the upper floor with architraves and blind balustrades. | II |
| The Odd Fellows; 53.71423°N 2.09705°W | — | c. 1870 | A hall, later converted for other uses, it is in stone with a top cornice and a hipped slate roof. There are three storeys and a symmetrical front of three bays. The central doorway has Doric columns and an entablature, and it is flanked by inserted shop fronts. Above the doorway is a tall window with an architrave and a pediment, and the other windows are sashes with architraves and cornices. | II |
| Town Hall; 53.71394°N 2.09739°W | | 1870–75 | The town hall was designed by John Gibson in Classical style. It is in sandstone with a lead roof, and has a rectangular plan with an apsidal north end. The building has a high rusticated basement, on which is a plinth, and three-quarter unfluted Composite columns, carrying a pulvinated frieze with rosettes, and a modillioned cornice. The front has three bays, and along the sides are seven bays. Each bay at the front contains a round-headed blind window, each bay on the side has a flat-headed window, and above each is a circular window. At the front is a pediment with statues in the tympanum. | I |
| Fielden School of Art; 53.72043°N 2.10816°W | | c. 1871 | The building is in stone with a stone slate roof, and is in Gothic Revival style. It consists of a single-storey three-bay hall range, and flanking cross-wings; the cross-wings and each of the hall range bays has a coped gable and a finial. On the west front the first bay has a canted bay window, and in the right angle is a gabled porch. At the rear the central bay has a large rose window. | II |
| Boundary stone, Sand Bed Bridge; 53.73228°N 2.04706°W | | Late 19th century | The stone marked the boundary between the Rural District and the Borough of Todmorden. It is built into the parapet of the bridge, and is divided into two sections, each inscribed with one of the two regions. | II |
| Boundary stone north of Roebuck Inn; 53.73492°N 2.15670°W | | Late 19th century | The stone marks the boundary between the counties of Lancashire and Yorkshire, and is on the northeast side of the A464 road. The stone has an arched head and is divided down the middle. On each side is inscribed the name of the county. | II |
| Milestone in front of 927 Burnley Road; 53.73202°N 2.15388°W | | Late 19th century | The milestone is on the southwest side of the A646 road. It is an upright stone with two chamfered faces, and is inscribed with the distances to Todmorden and Burnley. | II |
| Wood Cottage; 53.71988°N 2.11169°W | — | Late 19th century (probable) | Originally a dower house for Scaitcliffe Hall, it is in stone with a slate roof. There are two storeys and an irregular T-shaped plan, with a front of three bays, the right bay being a gabled cross-wing. The porch on the front is open and has a pediment, and the porch at the rear is closed. The windows are sashes of varying types. In the gable of the cross-wing is a family crest. | II |
| St Michael's Church, Cornholme; 53.73219°N 2.13722°W | | 1902 | The church, designed by C. Hodgson Fowler in Gothic style, is built in stone with a slate roof. It consists of a nave with a clerestory, north and south aisles, a north porch, a north transept, a chancel, and a west steeple. The steeple has a tower with three stages, diagonal buttresses, a west window with a pointed arch, a semi-octagonal stair tower, a clock face, an embattled parapet, and a recessed octagonal spire. | II |
| Bandstand, Centre Vale Park; 53.71949°N 2.10473°W | | 1914 | The bandstand has cast iron columns, a steel frame, and timber coverings, and is on a plinth of concrete, brick and sandstone. It has a rectangular plan, an open front, and contains concave staging and a concave rear wall. The roof slopes to the rear, and has a shaped cornice containing paired dentils. On the sides is latticework, and at the top of the columns are decorative consoles supporting the overhanging roof. Across the front of the stage are small panels with diamond decoration. | II |
| Cornholme War Memorial; 53.73229°N 2.13529°W | | 1920 | The war memorial is in the churchyard of Vale Baptist Church. It consists of a statue of the Angel of Peace in white marble, standing on a plinth of Yorkshire sandstone. This is on a base of three square steps, on a broader step, all within a kerbed pavement. There are inscriptions on the front of the plinth and the top step. The names of those lost in the First World War are on the other faces of the plinth, and of those lost in the Second World War are on middle step. | II |
| War Memorial, Centre Vale Park; 53.71824°N 2.10753°W | — | 1921 | The war memorial, by Gilbert Bayes, consists of three statues in Portland stone. In the centre is a statue of Saint George holding a sword and standing on a globe supported by maidens, and this is flanked by two small statues of children. The whole stands on a plinth in a horseshoe-shaped basin. Behind is a wall with the dates of the two World Wars, and there are tablets with the names of those lost in the conflicts. | II |
| Model Farm, Dobroyd Castle; 53.71003°N 2.11286°W | | Undated | The farm buildings are in stone, and consist of a block in the form of a keep with an embattled parapet and a central gablet. This is linked by low cart sheds to two-storey towers to the west, the northern tower being the farmhouse. The windows have plain surrounds. | II |
