= Dobroyd =

Dobroyd may refer to:

- Dobroyd Castle, castle in West Yorkshire, England
- Dobroyd Head, headland in Sydney, Australia
- Dobroyd Point, New South Wales, suburb of Sydney
