= Eastwood, West Yorkshire =

Coordinates: 53.727915°N 2.052297°W

Eastwood
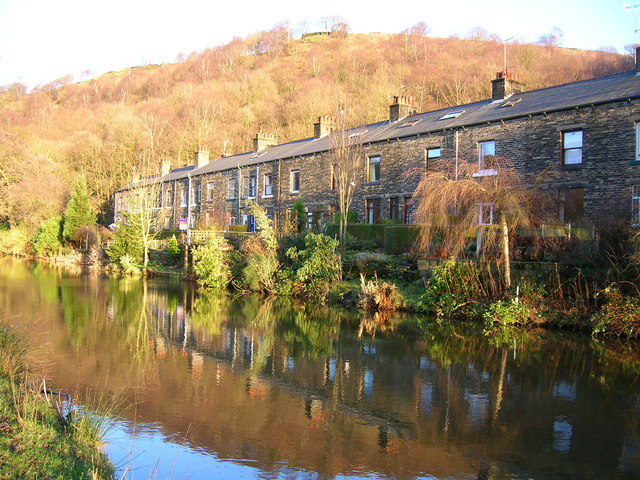
- Cottages by the Rochdale Canal, in Eastwood

- Location within West Yorkshire
- OS grid reference: SD965257
- Civil parish: Todmorden
- Metropolitan borough: Calderdale
- Metropolitan county: West Yorkshire
- Region: Yorkshire and the Humber
- Country: England
- Sovereign state: United Kingdom
- Post town: TODMORDEN
- Postcode district: OL14
- Dialling code: 01706
- Police: West Yorkshire
- Fire: West Yorkshire
- Ambulance: Yorkshire
- UK Parliament: Calder Valley

Eastwood is a place within the civil parish of Todmorden and Metropolitan Borough of Calderdale, in West Yorkshire, England. It lies 8 miles (12.9 km) west from Halifax, roughly equidistant from Todmorden's town centre, which is 2 miles (3.2 km) to the southwest, and Hebden Bridge, which is 2 miles to the northeast, along the course of the River Calder. Eastwood falls within the Calder ward of Calderdale council.

Historically a part of the West Riding of Yorkshire, sources suggest that Eastwood's name was almost certainly taken from the Eastwoode family, who were local landowners active from the 13th to 17th centuries. Eastwood Old Hall is the former seat of this family, and remains as a landmark and manorhouse within the locality

== History ==
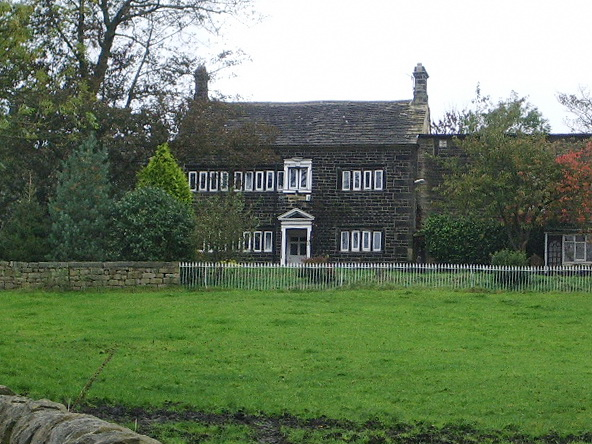
Eastwood Old Hall is the ancient seat of the Eastwoode family

The earliest reference for Eastwood is in 1286 when it was called Estwoode. The name was almost certainly taken from the Eastwoode family who owned local land from the 13th to 17th centuries, and lived in Eastwood Old Hall.

In the 19th century, Eastwood was an important (and relatively wealthy) habitation with a considerable amount of industry, supported by its own railway station, which was used to support local mill workers and industrialists travel to towns as far as Rochdale and Manchester.

Though today a small hamlet, Eastwood once contained its own school, chapel, train station, hotel and cricket team. The cricket pitch is still in use today.

=== Eastwood family ===
The family of Eastwood is thought to have given its name to the locality. Eastwood continues to be a common name in and around this part of northern England. Some members of this lineage included John Eastwood who fabricated Todmorden Mills in Toronto Canada.

== Governance ==
From a very early time, Eastwood formed part of the ancient ecclesiastical parish of Halifax.

From 1894 until 1939, Eastwood, together with Heptonstall and parts of the south Pennines formed part of the Todmorden Rural District, in the West Riding of Yorkshire, and from 1939 until 1974, lay within Hepton Rural District, also from the West Riding.

Under the Local Government Act 1972, the West Riding of Yorkshire was abolished and Eastwood has since formed part of the metropolitan borough of Calderdale, in West Yorkshire.

Eastwood forms part of the civil parish of Todmorden.

== Geography ==
Eastwood, set amongst the easterly portion of two wooded areas, lies along the course of the River Calder, parallel to Halifax Road and a section of the Caldervale railway line, on the west side of Jumble Hole Clough.

The Rochdale Canal passes through the settlement.
