= Todmorden Markets =

Public market in England

Coordinates: 53.7144°N 2.0962°W

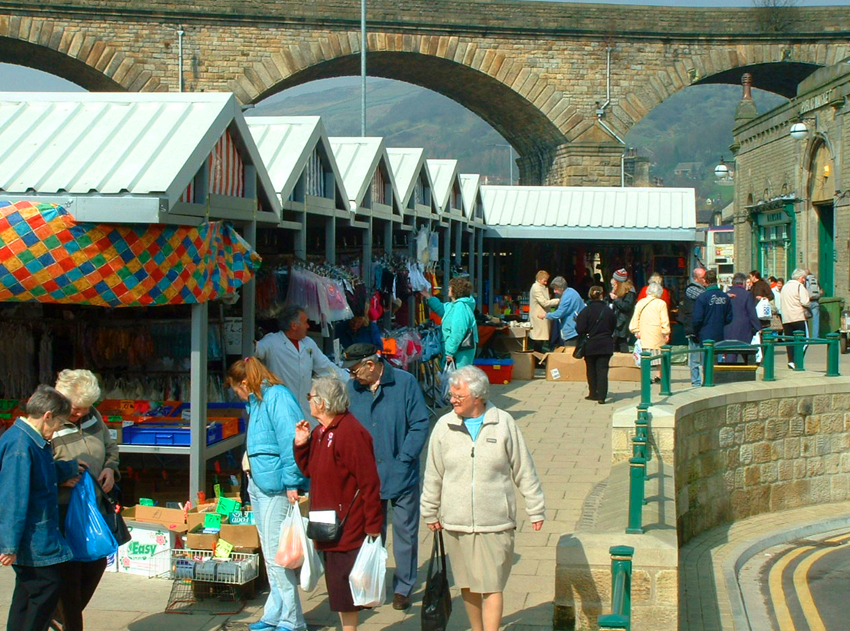
Todmorden Market

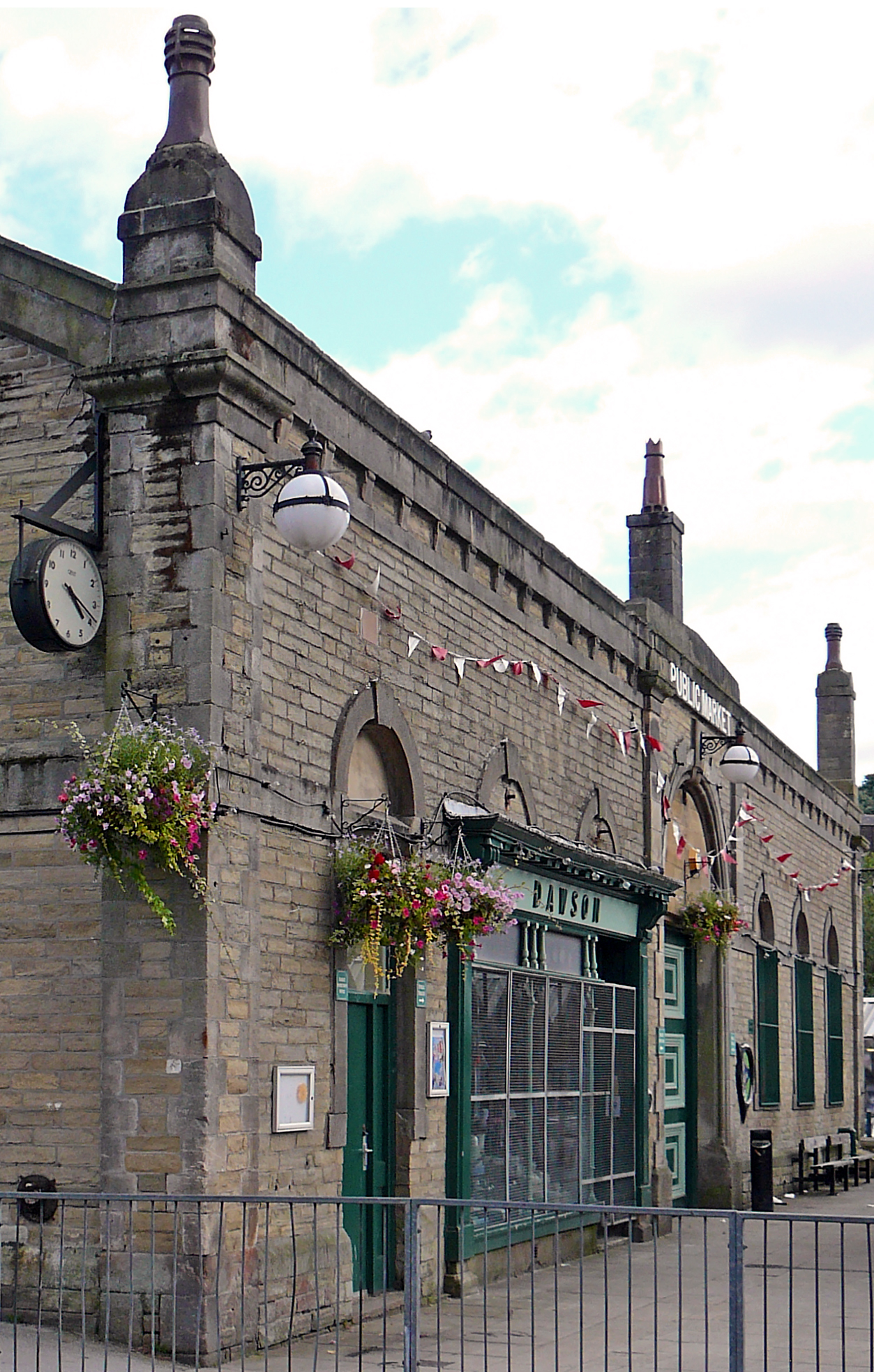
Todmorden Market Hall

Todmorden Markets consist of an indoor market held in the Public Market Hall and an outdoor open air market held to the front of the Public Market Hall in central Todmorden adjacent to the Town Hall. The indoor market has over 40 market traders stalls selling fresh produce, meat, dairy produce, bread, ironmongery, books, clothing, carpets and speciality and ethnic foods. Official opening times of the Public Market Hall are Monday to Saturday (half day closing Tuesday) 9.00am to 5.30pm

The outdoor market is open 9.00am to 4.00pm Wednesday, Thursday, Friday, Saturday and Sunday. Thursday is exclusively a second hand market whereas Sunday is a mix of general retail and second hand goods.

The two markets are operated by Calderdale Council.

== History ==
The Market town of Todmorden has had a market since 1802 when it was held in land near White Hart Fold, following a town meeting in 1801. In 1868, the land on which it currently stands next to the Town Hall was bought by the Local Board.

In 1879, the Public Market Hall which houses over 40 indoor stalls was built by Dugdale of Hebden Bridge. In April 1879, Mr John Fielden, the chairman of the Local Board laid the cornerstone and on 29 December of the same year he opened the finished building.

In 1905, a fire caused £1000 of damage to the Public Market Hall.

In 2003, the open air market was extensively refurbished with new surfacing, new stalls which were more weatherproof than the previous stalls and new public lavatories. There are now 72 stalls in the open air market.

In 2017, the main market hall was refurbished with £500,000 spent on new roofing, insulation and redecoration.
