= Eastwood (L&Y) railway station =

Disused railway station in West Yorkshire, England

Eastwood
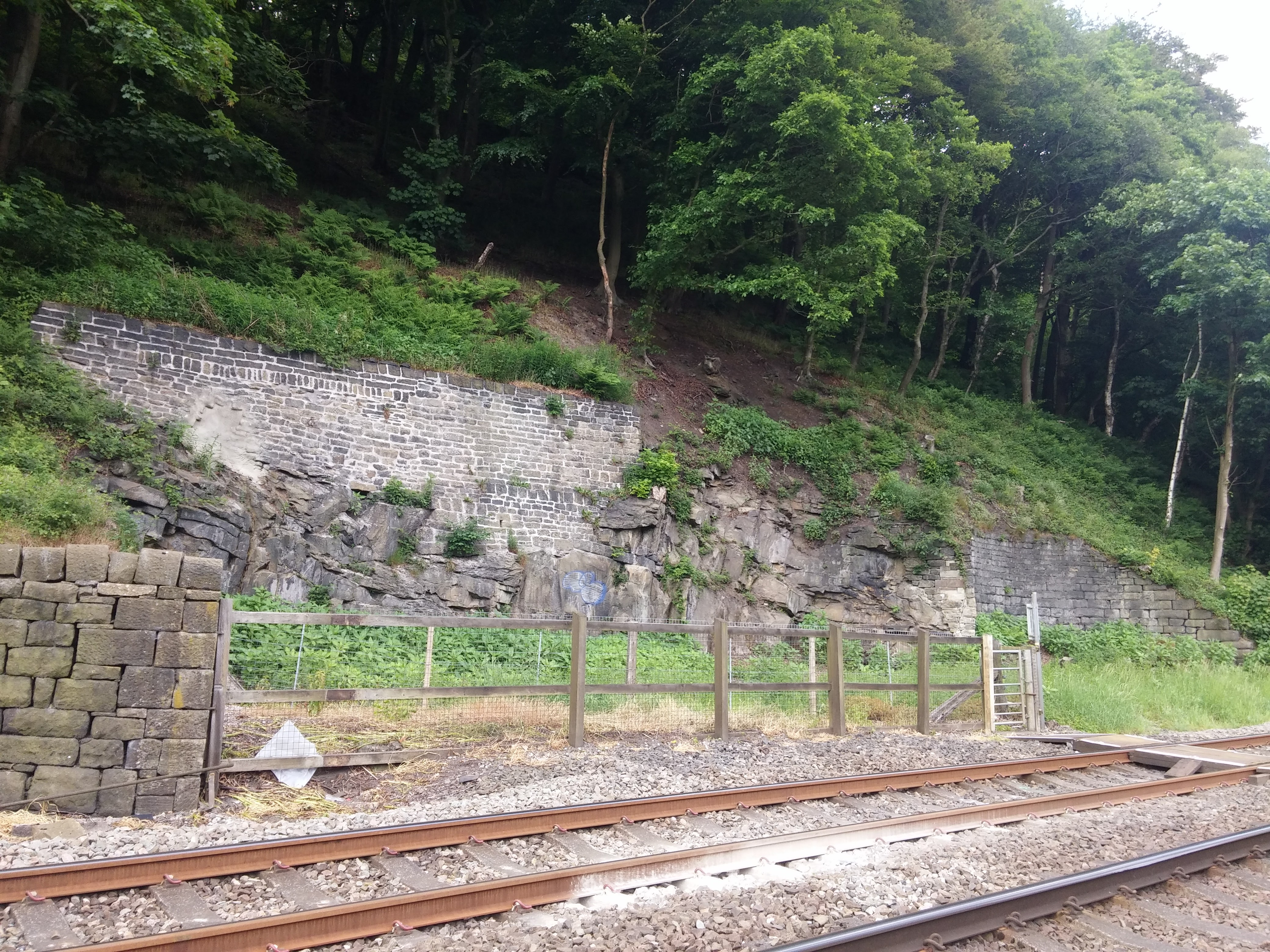
- Site of Eastwood station building, with level crossing to the right

General information
- Location: Eastwood, Calderdale; England
- Coordinates: 53.730660°N 2.050380°W
- Grid reference: SD967260
- Platforms: 2

Other information
- Status: Disused

History
- Original company: Manchester and Leeds Railway
- Pre-grouping: Lancashire and Yorkshire Railway
- Post-grouping: London, Midland and Scottish Railway

Key dates
- 1 January 1841: Opened
- 3 December 1951: Closed
Location

Eastwood Railway Station served the village of Eastwood in the civil parish of Todmorden, West Yorkshire, England. The station opened with the line on New Years Day 1841 and was closed on 3 December 1951 by British Railways. Retaining walls in the cliff above the site, together with a substantial road access ramp, and the remains of adjacent coal drops can still be seen. In addition, the former vehicle-size level crossing has survived in reduced form, as a pedestrian crossing.

The signal box here survived for around 20 more years until its abolition as part of the Preston area resignalling scheme in 1972. A derailment in the (now removed) goods loop next to the westbound line in October 1986 blocked the route for over a week — heavy lifting equipment had to be brought in to recover several overturned coal hopper wagons from the scene, whilst a replacement bus service ran between Todmorden and Hebden Bridge stations.

Preceding station	Historical railways	Following station
Todmorden; Line and station open	L&YR; Caldervale Line	Hebden Bridge; Line and station open
Stansfield Hall; Line open, station closed	L&YR; Caldervale Line	Hebden Bridge; Line and station open
