= Mike Ferrentino =

American-New Zealand journalist

Mike Ferrentino is a mountain bike (MTB) journalist.

== Beginnings and career ==
He was born in California and raised in New Zealand.

In 1994, Ferrentino began writing a column for a new glossy mountain bike magazine that the publishers of Surfer were putting together called BIKE. This column was called The Grimy Handshake, a reference to the column's bike-mechanic point of view and he came to be known as BIKE's "random juggernaut".

In 2005, with the departure of editor Ron Ige, Mike Ferrentino became the Editor in Chief of BIKE magazine. He also was guest editor for an issue of the UK MTB magazine Singletrack in 2005. In November 2006 Ferrentino stepped down from the editor role at Bike magazine, and took on a marketing role at Santa Cruz Bicycles, which ended in 2012. He continues writing his Grimy Handshake column for Bike magazine. Mike is currently writing regular columns for NSMB.com, a mountain bike e-zine based in North Vancouver BC that focuses its content on riding on the North Shore (BC) and throughout the Sea to Sky (S2S) region of British Columbia.

Mike Ferrentino is a mountain bike (MTB) journalist. He is known for his first-person, you-are-there style of documenting the sport, as well as admiration for writers like Hunter Thompson and Ken Kesey.

In his columns, Mike has supported the return of "old school" mountain biking. Specifically, he defines "old school" MTB as light, relatively fragile, cross-country mountain bikes, made with steel- the original, repairable, and resilient MTB frame material. He says that this heavier material means that a person must put in the effort to climb hills before enjoying the reward of riding back down and he criticizes MTB riders who take a ski lift to the top of the mountain along with a bike too heavy to be ridden to the top, then quickly enjoying the downhill before being effortlessly whisked to the top once again.
