= Todmorden Town Hall =

Municipal building in Todmorden, West Yorkshire, England

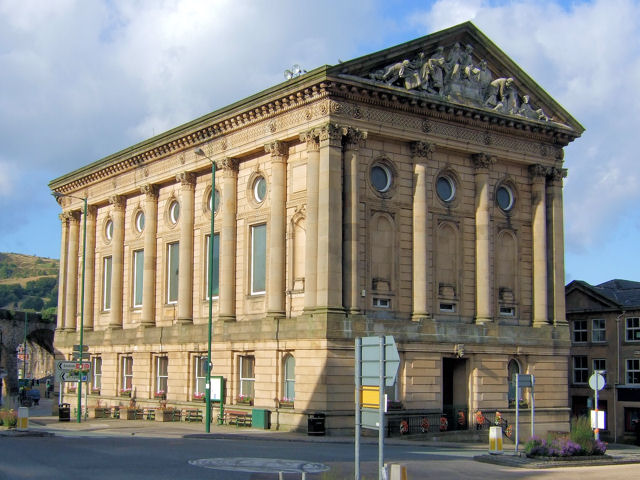
- Todmorden Town Hall

- Shown in West Yorkshire
- 53.7139°N 2.0975°W
- Location: Halifax Road, Todmorden

History
- Built: 1875

Site notes
- Architect: John Gibson
- Architectural style: Neoclassical style

Listed Building – Grade I
- Official name: Todmorden Town Hall
- Designated: 22 November 1966
- Reference no.: 1228980

Todmorden Town Hall is a municipal building in Halifax Road, Todmorden, West Yorkshire, England. The town hall, which is the meeting place of Todmorden Town Council, is a grade I listed building.

== History ==
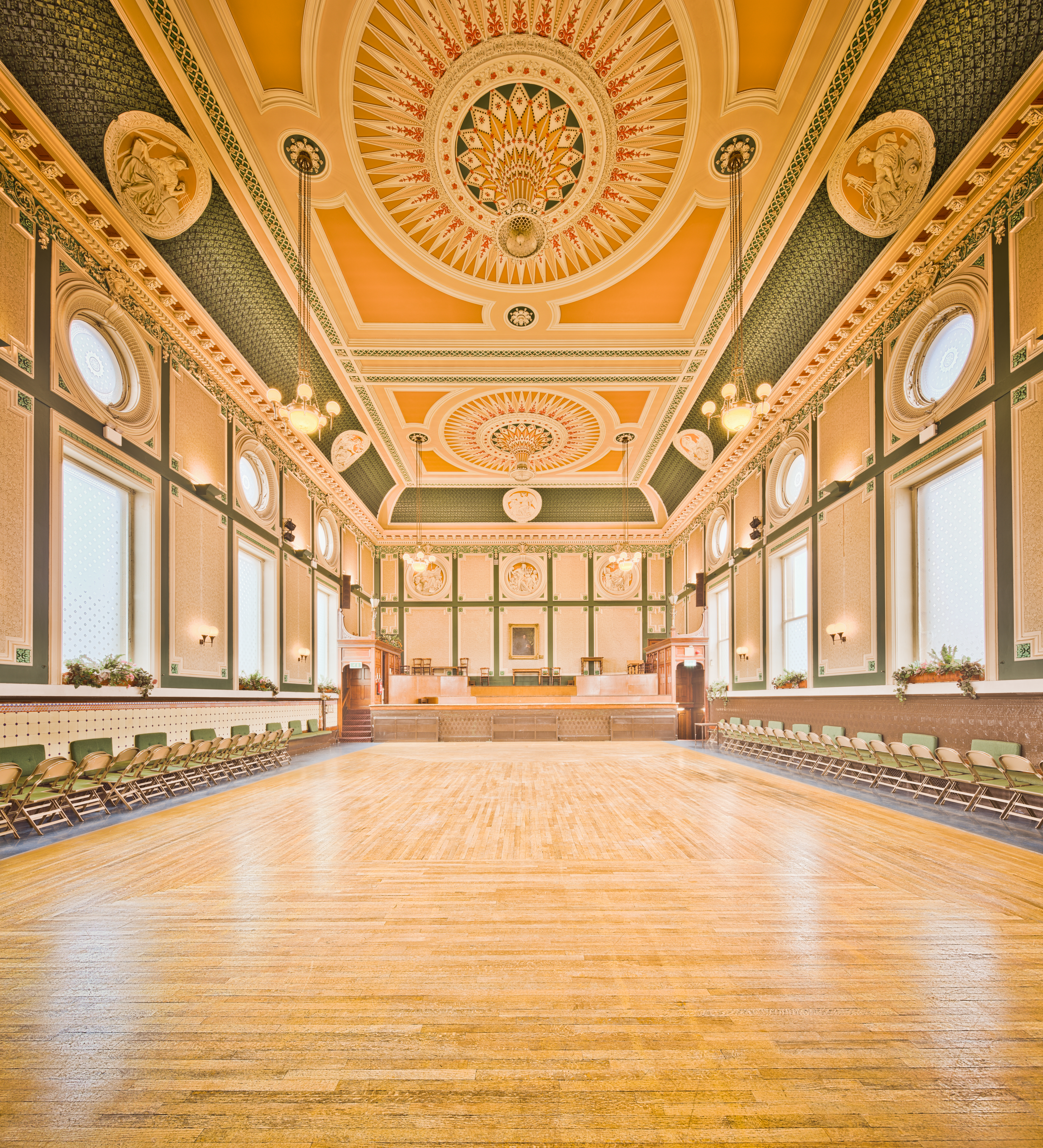
Todmorden Town Hall interior

In the mid-19th century Todmorden experienced significant population growth associated with the increasing number of cotton mills in the town. In this context, in the early 1860s, the local board of health decided to procure a town hall: the site they selected straddled the Walsden Water, a tributary of the River Calder, which formed the historic boundary between Yorkshire and Lancashire. The board appointed local architect, James Green, as the designer for the project and construction got underway in 1866. However, after supplies of raw cotton from the United States were cut during the Lancashire Cotton Famine of 1861–65, the project and its supporters got into financial difficulties. The Fielden family, who owned many of the cotton mills in the town, acquired the site, appointed John Gibson as the new architect and took over financial responsibility for the development. (Note: The Fielden family was represented by Samuel, John and Joshua Fielding, all sons of the late John Fielden (1784–1849), a British industrialist and Radical Member of Parliament for Oldham.)

Work restarted in June 1871. The building, which was designed in the neoclassical style, was built in ashlar stone and officially opened by the Postmaster General, Lord John Manners, on 3 April 1875. The design involved a symmetrical main frontage with three bays facing onto Halifax Road; there was rusticated basement with a plinth above. On the plinth there were blind niches in each of the bays with oculi above flanked by Composite order columns supporting an entablature with a frieze and a pediment. The 67 feet (20 m) high pediment contained a finely carved tympanum which depicted two central female figures on a pedestal. The left-hand sculpture represented Lancashire (cotton spinning and weaving industries), and the right-hand one Yorkshire (wool manufacturing, engineering and agriculture). The side elevations contained seven bays in a similar style but with windows instead of niches and the rear elevation was curved and also contained windows instead of niches. Internally, the principal rooms were the main hall which extended the full length of the building on the first floor and the courtroom below.

For a while it was possible to dance in the main hall, forward and back, across two counties of England. However, the administrative border between Yorkshire and Lancashire was altered by the Local Government Act 1888 placing the whole of the town within the West Riding. The Fielden family donated the building to the town on 6 August 1891. The courtroom was adapted for use as a council chamber after the building became the headquarters of Todmorden Urban District Council in 1894 and of Todmorden Borough Council in 1896. The town hall continued to be used as a public venue and concert performers included the contralto singer, Kathleen Ferrier, who made an appearance on 21 December 1943.

The building continued to serve as a meeting place for Todmorden Borough Council for much of the 20th century but ceased to be the local seat of government after the enlarged Calderdale Metropolitan Borough Council was formed in 1974. The building subsequently became the meeting place of Todmorden Town Council and a committee room was re-named after the locally-born Nobel laureate, Sir John Cockcroft, in September 2018.

In March 2025, a heritage concert was performed by Todmorden Orchestra to celebrate the town hall's 150th anniversary.

Works of art in the building include sculptures by Giovanni Maria Benzoni depicting the Flight from Pompeii and the Biblical Ruth as well as a bust of John Fielden MP by Thomas Campbell and a memorial plinth by Gilbert Bayes.

== See also ==
- Grade I listed buildings in West Yorkshire
- Listed buildings in Todmorden (inner area)
