= Singletrack (magazine) =

British mountain biking magazine

Singletrack issue 2, Summer 2001

Singletrack is a UK-based mountain biking magazine and website founded in 2001. It is based in Todmorden, West Yorkshire.

== History and profile ==
Singletrack was founded in 2001 by Chipps Chippendale, Mark Alker and Shaun Murray. The magazine is currently published six times a year in both print and a variety of digital formats. In 2011 Singletrack published its first eBook - a collection of the previously published columns of Mike Ferrentino.

Singletrack grew from an earlier website, GoFar, an acronym for 'Get Out For A Ride', which ran from 1998 to 2001 and was founded by Matt Wenham along with many contributors from the uk.rec.cycling Usenet newsgroup including Shaun Murray, Callum Wilson, Tony Raven, Russell Pinder, Myra VanInwegen and others, and from outside Usenet, Mark Alker, Carvel Lonsdale and many more. GoFar was largely a reaction to the death of the Future Publishing magazine Mountainbike World on which Chipps Chippendale once worked.

Singletrack magazine won the Best Cycling Magazine award in 2009 and 2010 - Awarded by Bikebiz trade magazine. The website Singletrackworld.com also won the best website award from Bikebiz in 2013. In 2011 Singletrack also won the Northern Sports Awards, Best Website category . In May 2012 the Specialist Media Show awarded Singletrack a Media Pioneer Award for its approach to combining digital and print into a combined publishing strategy. Singletrackworld.com won best website 2013 awarded by Bikebiz trade magazine.
