= Dobroyd Castle =

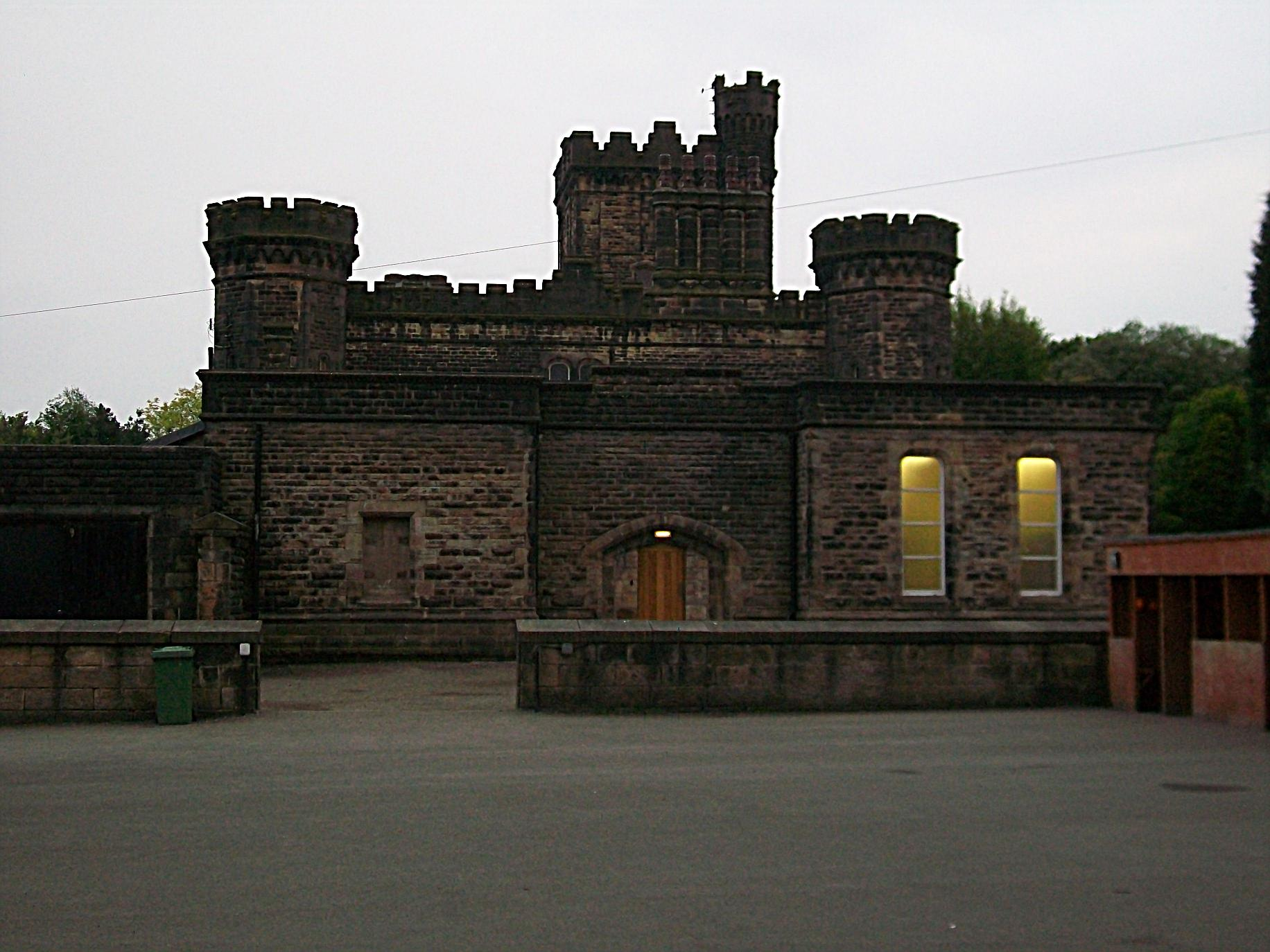
- Courtyard of Dobroyd Castle

- Location within West Yorkshire

General information
- Coordinates: 53°42′37″N 2°6′29″W

Design and construction
- Architect: John Gibson

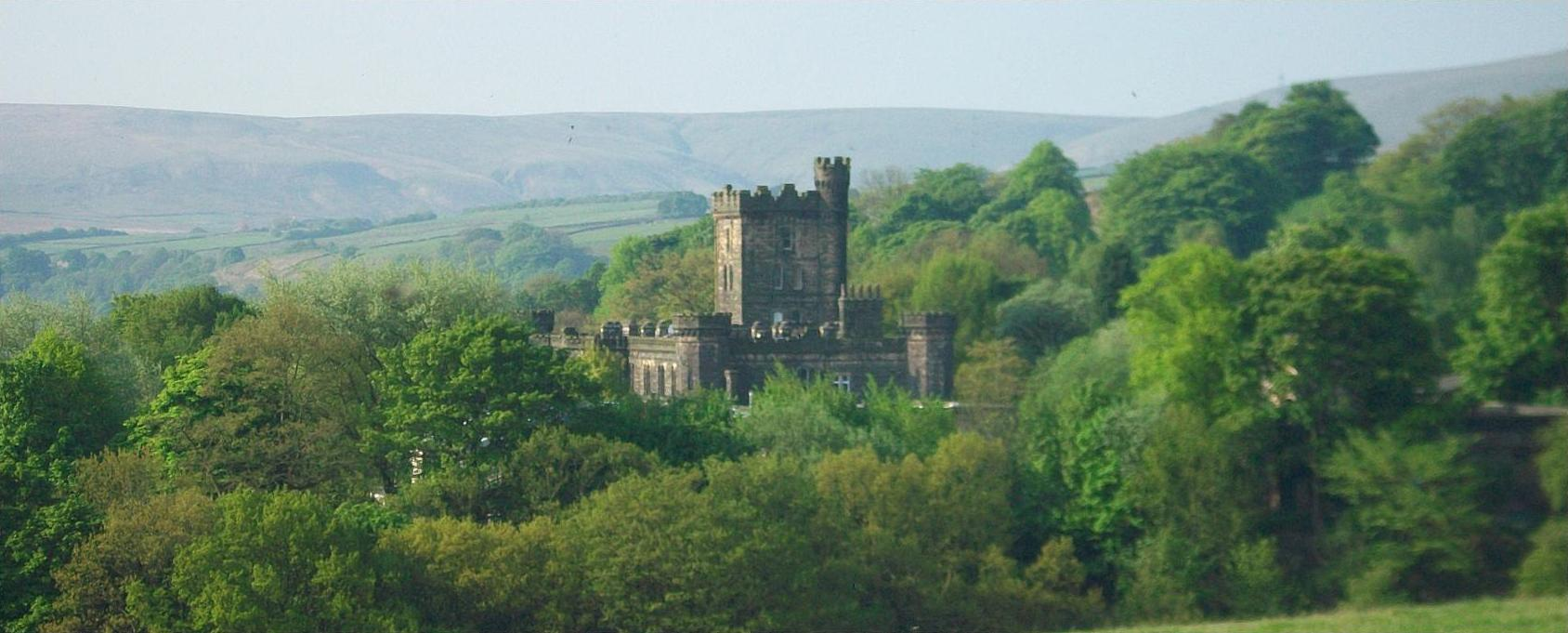
Dobroyd Castle, viewed from the north

Dobroyd Castle is an important historic building above the town of Todmorden, West Yorkshire, England. It was built for John Fielden, local mill owner and son of Honest John Fielden the Social Reformer and MP.

The building has had a varied past. First built as an extravagant mansion house, then it was used as an Approved school, it then became a Buddhist Retreat centre and the building is currently used as an Activity Centre (Known as Robinwood) for Primary School Groups. The castle has 66 rooms and is Grade II* listed.

== History ==
In the mid 19th century Todmorden was a booming, successful cotton town. It is in this setting that rich industrialist, John Fielden (Junior) fell in love with local worker, Ruth Stansfield and asked her to be his wife. It is often said that her reply was that she would marry him if he built her a castle. Whether or not that was said, the couple married in 1857 and in due course a castle was built. Fielden commissioned prestigious architect, John Gibson to design and build the Castle between 1866 and 1869 at a cost of £71,589.

John and Ruth Fielden lived in the Castle but the couple became progressively distant and estranged, a Swiss chalet was built in the valley bottom for Ruth and it is said that she became an alcoholic. Ruth died in 1877 (aged 50), just 8 years after the castle's completion. John died in the castle in 1893 (aged 77). After his death, the Castle stayed in the Fielden family but was used infrequently and was eventually sold for £10,000.

The Home Office used the castle between 1942 and 1979 as an Approved School for 15- to 18-year-old males to learn manual skills such as building or carpentry alongside the rest of their curriculum. After a 3-month closure in 1979 the castle reopened as the privately run Castle School. 20 boys with emotional and behavioural problems were educated there. Following the school's closure in 1989 the castle lay empty for 6 years.

The Castle was acquired by Buddhists of the New Kadampa Tradition in 1995. They bought the castle for £320,000 and the building became the Losang Dragpa Centre, named after a famous teacher of Tibetan Buddhism. In 2007 it was announced that the Buddhists were leaving the Castle and there was concern locally for the future of the Castle, especially because the roof was in a state of disrepair and the work required to renovate it was going to cost around £200,000. The Buddhists had secured a grant for £127,000 from English Heritage and the Heritage Lottery Fund but this would not necessarily be transferable to the new owners.

Robinwood Activity Centre Ltd. acquired the castle and grounds for £2.2 million in 2008 and by March 2009 had transformed the Castle into an activity centre.

== The Building ==
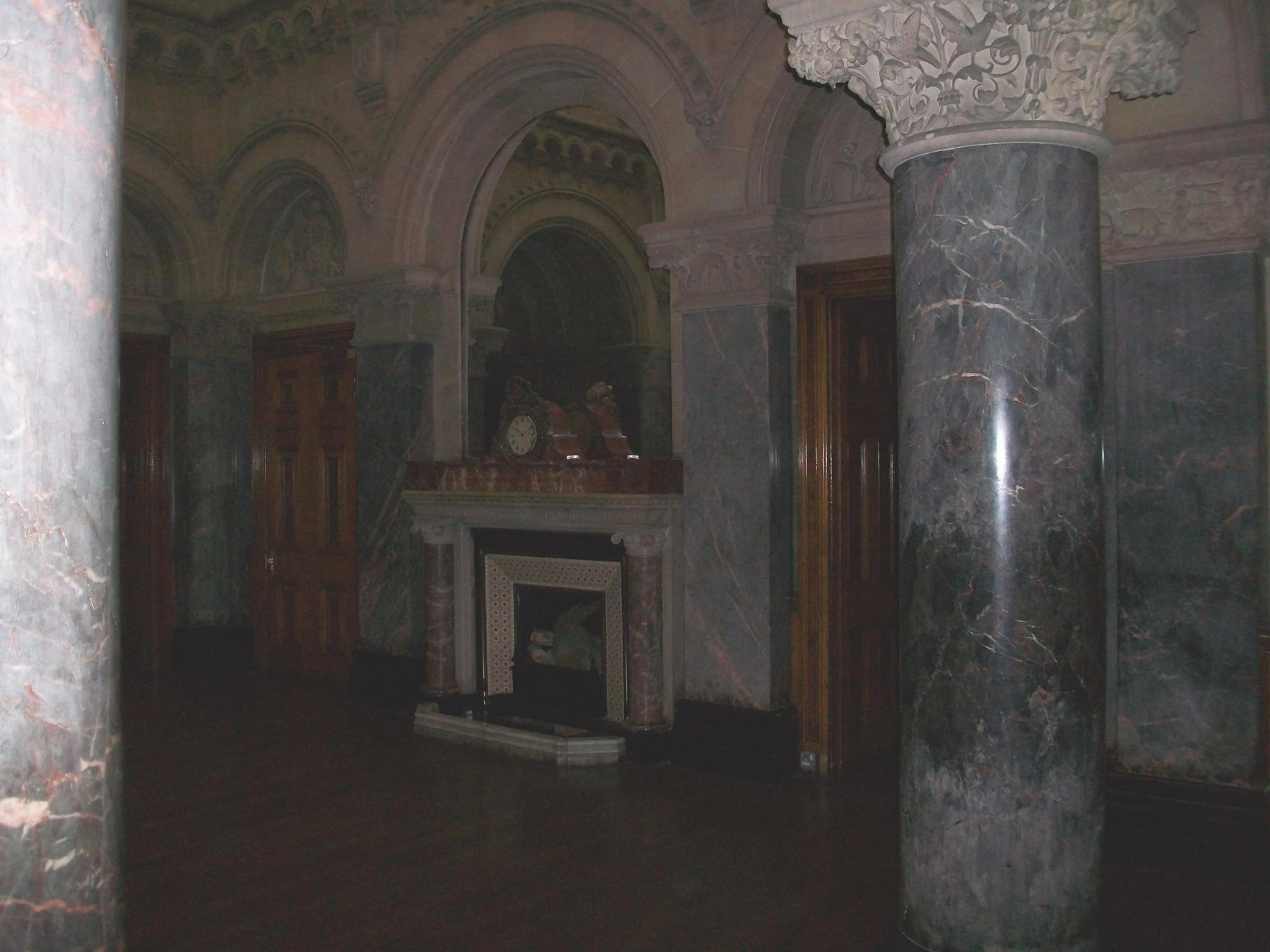
The Fireplace and Marble Pillars of the Saloon Area

Fielden commissioned John Gibson to design the Castle. It was to "Immortalise the name of Fielden" and to be "the most commanding object in the neighbourhood". The total cost of the building came to a total of £71,589 making it more expensive than either Todmorden Town Hall or Todmorden's Unitarian Church, both prestigious and architecturally significant buildings designed by Gibson.

The 2 storey building has 4 turrets on its corners, several bay windows and a substantial 4 storey tower. The vast majority of the top of the building is castellated with battlements although of course this is for aesthetic rather than defensive reasons. Inside the castle are large columns of Devonshire Marble, a Rose Pink Marble fireplace, and an imposing Spinkwell Stone staircase. The Saloon (or 'Salon') area is topped by two large glass domes. The building contains four stone Tympana carved from Caen stone. The four carvings depict different images associated with the cotton industry. The Fieldens were a force for change in the conditions of workers in the very industry that made their own fortunes. This has certainly led some to believe that the carvings are intended to communicate these humanitarian beliefs. The 66-room building is Grade II* listed.

The Four Stone Tympana of Dobroyd Castle's Saloon

The first carving of enslaved African people picking cotton in America. The scene does not romanticise the cotton growing scene but shows a slave master watching over the workers as they toil.

The second tympanum shows a port where a cargo of cotton bales are to be loaded onto a ship, again with the enslaved workers who are tying up the bales whilst a port official looks on from his desk.

A third tympanum shows Richard Arkwright"The Father of the Factory System" working on what was to become the Water frame, an important invention allowing cheap yarn and therefore cheap cloth to be manufactured. This sparked the great expansion of the cotton industry.

The fourth and last carving shows women at a weaving loom and the finished cloth. The product that made the Fieldens rich.

== See also ==
- Castles in Great Britain and Ireland
- List of castles in England
