= Todmorden Unitarian Church =

Coordinates: 53.7111°N 2.0990°W

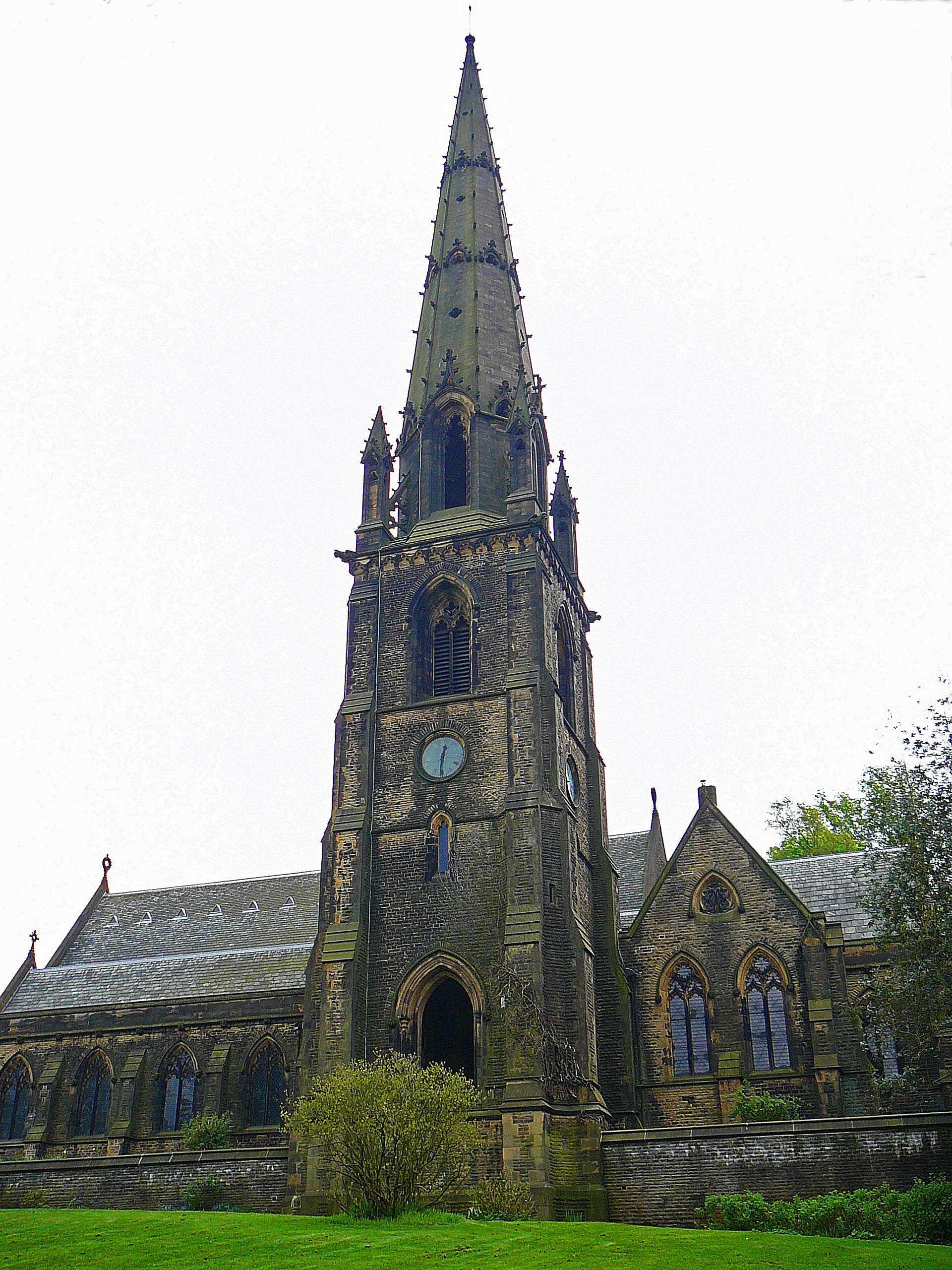
- Todmorden Unitarian Church

- Location in West Yorkshire
- OS grid reference: SD 935 239
- Location: Honey Hole Road, Todmorden, West Yorkshire
- Country: England
- Denomination: Unitarian
- Website: http://www.todunitarian.co.uk

History
- Founded: 1865
- Founder(s): Joshua, John (junior) and Samuel Fielden

Architecture
- Functional status: active
- Heritage designation: Grade I
- Designated: 22 November 1966
- Architect: John Gibson
- Architectural type: Church
- Style: Gothic Revival
- Groundbreaking: 1865
- Completed: 1869
- Construction cost: £35,000 (equivalent to £3,840,000 in 2025)

Specifications
- Materials: Stone with slate roof

Todmorden Unitarian Church is a Unitarian church located on Honey Hole Road, Todmorden, West Yorkshire, England (grid reference SD935239). Built in honour of John Fielden, a local mill owner and a social reformer, the church was completed in 1869. It was declared redundant in 1987 and came under the care of the Historic Chapels Trust. Since 2008, regular services have been held in the building, but it remains in the care of the Trust. The church is recorded in the National Heritage List for England as a designated Grade I listed building,

== Early history ==
The Unitarian movement originated in Todmorden in the early 19th century, and one of their prominent members was John Fielden, a local mill owner and a social reformer, who later became a Member of Parliament. Because of his work, Fielden has been nicknamed "Honest John". The Unitarians built their first chapel and school in 1823, and the congregation steadily increased in size. Fielden died in 1849. After his death, the Unitarian community continued to grow, and the chapel became inadequate for their needs. In 1865 building of a new church started. This was built in memory of John Fielden and paid for by his three sons, Joshua, John (junior) and Samuel. It was built on land they owned at Honey Hole. "Money was no object to these brothers", and the resulting building, costing over £35,000 (equivalent to £3,840,000 in 2025), was large and splendid, and was built using the best quality materials. The church was completed in 1869, and at its opening service in April of that year, the first sermon was preached to a congregation of 800 by William Gaskell, widower of the novelist Elizabeth Gaskell. A lodge (or gatehouse) was built at the same time as the church.

== Architecture ==
=== Structure ===
The church was designed by John Gibson. Gibson had previously worked for the Fielden family and had designed Dobroyd Castle for John Fielden (junior) on the opposite side of the valley. It is constructed in stone with a slate roof. Its plan consists of a seven-bay nave with aisles, transepts, a single-bay chancel, a porch, and a large tower with a spire. It is in Gothic style. At the west end is an elaborate rose window, and at the east end is a five-light window. The nave windows have two lights with traceried heads. Along the nave wall are buttresses and a string course carved with flowers. The tower is in three stages with angle buttresses and two-light bell openings. Its lowest stage forms an open porch. On top of the tower are pinnacles and an octagonal spire containing tall lucarnes. Internally, the arcades consist of pointed arches carried on Devonshire marble columns.

=== Fittings and furniture ===
The choir stalls and pews are carved with tracery and have poppyheads. The pulpit is constructed of differing coloured marbles. The font has a carved white marble bowl. In the chancel window is stained glass by Jean-Baptiste Capronnier of Belgium that depicts scenes from the life of Christ. There are memorial tablets to the founders of the church in the aisles. Also in the aisles are gas brackets that have been converted to electricity, and there are candelabras in the choir stalls. There is a ring of eight bells, all cast in 1868 by Mears and Stainbank of the Whitechapel Bell Foundry. Also in the tower is a clock and a carillon.

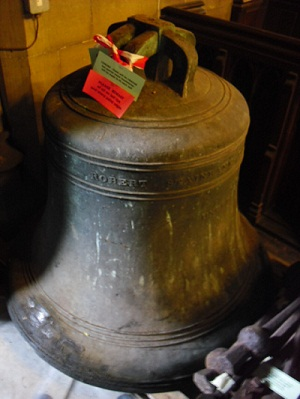
Church bells undergoing restoration

== Later history and present day ==
The Unitarian congregation continued to thrive into the 20th century, but as the century progressed, its size declined, and it became increasingly difficult to raise funds to keep the church going. It finally closed in 1987. Services continued to be held in the lodge, but these ended in 1992. After the church closed, its fabric deteriorated due to a combination of decay and vandalism. It was acquired in 1994 by the Historic Chapels Trust. The Trust has carried out a £1 million programme of repairs. These have included repair of the church roofs, stained glass, clock and peal of bells, restoration of the lodge and the interior of the tower, and the installation of a new heating system, toilets and kitchen. The surrounding historic landscape, including the burial ground, has also been restored. Services began again then in 2008 and continue. The church is licensed for weddings. The church is still listed as a member of the General Assembly of Unitarian and Free Christian Churches, the umbrella organisation for British Unitarians. It is currently the location of regular meetings of the Incredible Edible Todmorden project.

== Associated buildings ==
The church is set on a steep slope, surrounded by ornamental gardens, and has a wooded, landscaped burial ground. The lodge associated with the church is a Grade II listed building. It is in a single storey and constructed of stone with a slate roof. Its plan is T-shaped, the projecting wing having two steep gables, a Gothic-style doorway, and a canted bay window. The original Unitarian chapel and Sunday school in Wellfield Terrace is also listed Grade II. It also has a burial ground, and this contains the grave of the above-mentioned John Fielden.

== See also ==
- Grade I listed buildings in West Yorkshire
- Grade I listed churches in West Yorkshire
- List of chapels preserved by the Historic Chapels Trust
