= Todmorden =

Market town and civil parish in West Yorkshire, England

Coordinates: 53.713°N 2.096°W

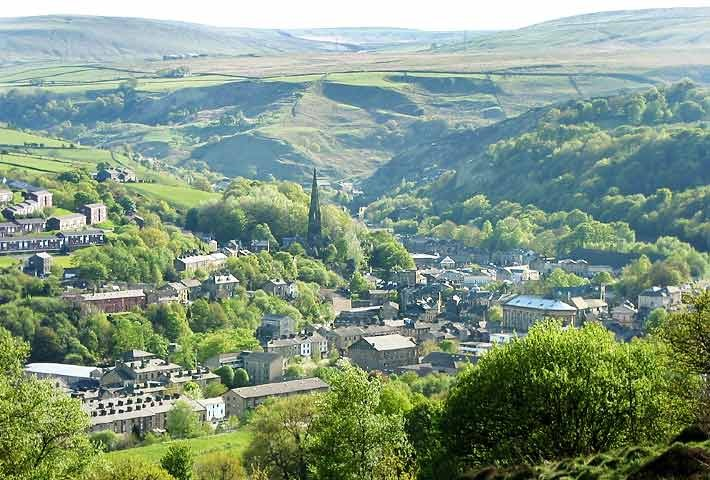
- A westerly view over Todmorden

- Location within West Yorkshire
- Population: 15,481 (Including Cornholme and Portsmouth, West Yorkshire. 2011 census)
- Demonym: Todmordian
- OS grid reference: SD936241
  - London: 174 mi (280 km) SSE
- Civil parish: Todmorden
- Metropolitan borough: Calderdale
- Metropolitan county: West Yorkshire
- Region: Yorkshire and the Humber
- Country: England
- Sovereign state: United Kingdom
- Post town: TODMORDEN
- Postcode district: OL14
- Dialling code: 01706
- Police: West Yorkshire
- Fire: West Yorkshire
- Ambulance: Yorkshire
- UK Parliament: Calder Valley

Todmorden (/ˈtɒdmərdən/ TOD-mər-dən; locally /ˈtɒdmɔːrdən, ˈtɒdmərdən, ˈtɔːmdɪn/) is a market town and civil parish in the Upper Calder Valley in Calderdale, West Yorkshire, England. It is 17 miles (27 kilometres) north-east of Manchester, 8 miles (13 km) south-east of Burnley and 9 miles (14 km) west of Halifax. In 2011, it had a population of 15,481.

Todmorden is at the confluence of three steep-sided Pennine valleys and is surrounded by moorlands with outcrops of sandblasted gritstone.

The historic boundary between Yorkshire and Lancashire is the River Calder and its tributary, Walsden Water, which run through the town. The administrative border was altered by the Local Government Act 1888 placing the whole of the town within the West Riding.

The town is served by Todmorden and Walsden railway stations.

== History ==
=== Toponymy ===
The name Todmorden is first attested in 1246, in the form Totmardene; other pre-modern spellings include Tottemerden, Totmereden and Totmerden. This is thought to originate in Old English as a personal name, Totta, combined with the Old English words mǣre ('border, boundary') and denu ('valley'). Thus the name once meant 'Totta's border-valley'. The valley in question is thought to have been the one running north-west from the town, and the border the one between Lancashire and Yorkshire.

Although, fanciful and historically implausible, alternative etymologies circulate, such as the speculation that the name derives from two words for death: German Tod and French mort, or that the name meant 'marshy den of the fox', supposedly from tod, a word of uncertain origin meaning 'fox' first attested around 1200, moor (which in Old English meant 'marsh'), and den (also attested in Old English to mean an animal's lair).

'Tod' is an informal name for Todmorden, often used in everyday conversation.

=== Prehistory ===
In 1898, Blackheath Barrow—a ring cairn monument situated above Cross Stone in Todmorden—was excavated and proved to be a site of "surpassing archaeological interest", according to J. Lawton Russell, one of the men who carried out the excavation. Various Bronze Age items were discovered, including sepulchral urns, a human skull, teeth and hands.

Russell contended that Blackheath Barrow was primarily a religious site, specifically intended for the "performance of funeral rites", as there was no evidence that it had been settled for domestic use. Of particular interest were the four cairns, positioned at the cardinal points of the compass, and it has been suggested that this indicates "a ritual evocation of the airts, or spirits of the four directions, with obvious correlates in relation to spirits in the land of the dead".

The various finds from the 1898 dig are now housed in the Todmorden Library, on permanent display.

=== Early history ===
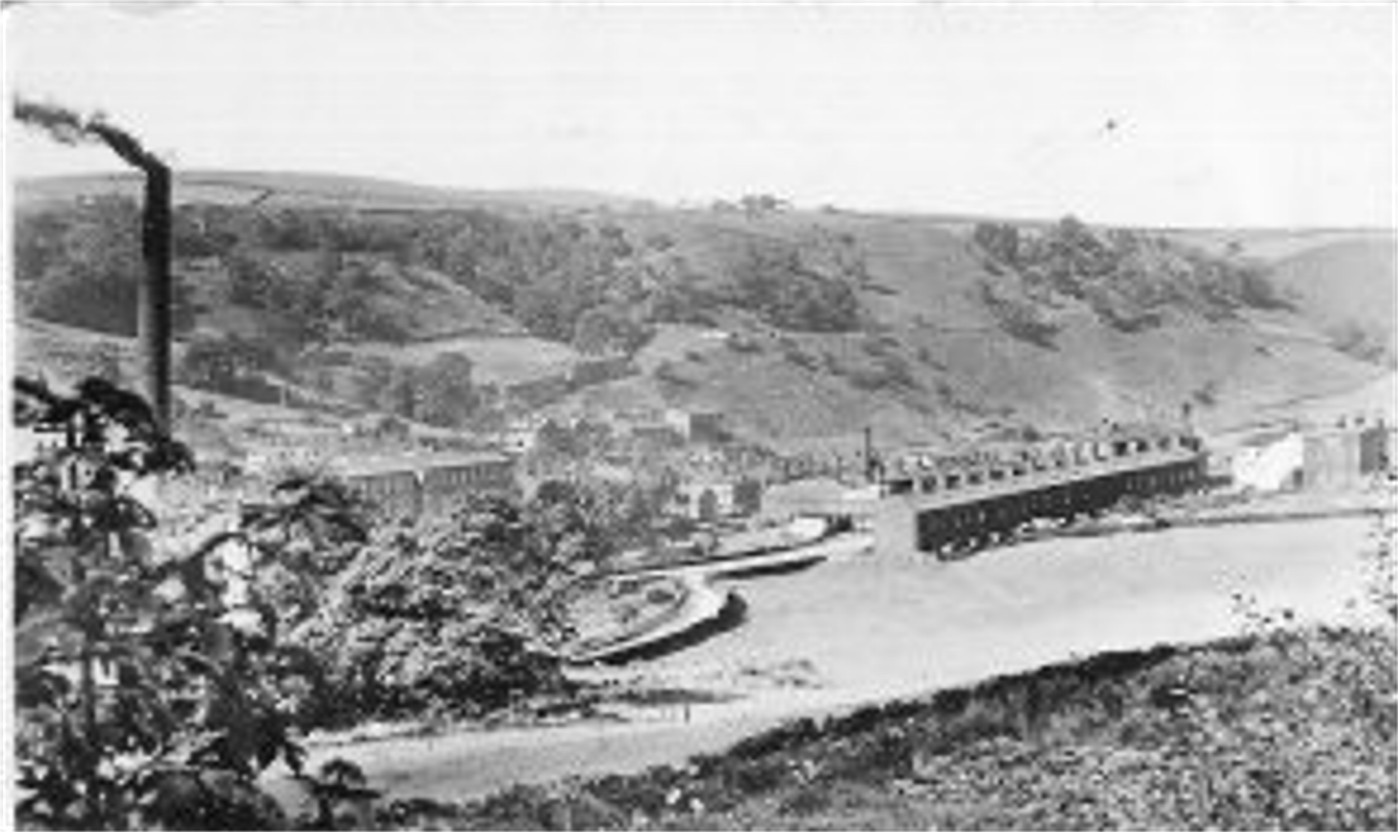
Todmorden c.1870

Settlement in medieval Todmorden was dispersed, most people living in scattered farms or in isolated hilltop agricultural settlements. Packhorse trails were marked by ancient stones, of which many still survive.

For hundreds of years, streams from the surrounding hills provided water for corn and fulling mills. Todmorden grew to relative prosperity by combining farming with the production of woollen textiles. Some yeomen clothiers were able to build fine houses, a few of which still exist today. Increasingly, though, the area's industry turned to cotton. The proximity of Manchester, as a source of material and trade, was undoubtedly a strong factor. Another was that the strong Pennine streams and rivers were able to power the machine looms. Improvements in textile machinery (by John Kay, James Hargreaves and Richard Arkwright), along with the development of turnpike roads (1751–1781), helped to develop the new cotton industry and to increase the local population.

=== 19th century ===
In 1801, most people still lived in the uplands; Todmorden itself could be considered as a mere village. During the years 1800–1845, great changes took place in the communications and transport of the town which were to have a crucial effect on promoting industrial growth. These included the building of: (1) better roads; (2) the Rochdale Canal (1804); and (3) the main line of the Manchester and Leeds Railway (1841), which became the Lancashire and Yorkshire Railway in 1847. This railway line incorporated the (then) longest tunnel in the world, the 2,885-yard-long (2,638-metre) Summit Tunnel. A second railway, from Todmorden to Burnley, opened as a single line in 1849, being doubled to meet demand in 1860. A short connecting line, from Stansfield Hall to Hall Royd, completed the "Todmorden Triangle" in 1862, thus enabling trains to travel in all three directions (Manchester, Leeds and Burnley) without reversing.

The Industrial Revolution caused a concentration of industry and settlement along the valley floor and a switch from woollens to cotton. One family in the area was particularly influential on the town; the Fielden family. They created a "dynasty" that changed the town forever by establishing several large mills, putting up assorted impressive buildings and bringing about social and educational change.

A double murder took place at Christ Church, Todmorden on 2 March 1868. The victims' graves lie in the churchyard. Miles Weatherhill, a 23-year-old weaver from the town, was forbidden from seeing his housemaid sweetheart, Sarah Bell, by the Reverend Anthony John Plow. Armed with four pistols and an axe, Weatherhill took revenge first on the vicar and then on Jane Smith, another maid who had informed Plow of the secret meetings. Miss Smith died at the scene, while the vicar survived another week before succumbing to his injuries. Weatherhill also seriously injured the vicar's wife. On 4 April 1868, Weatherhill became the last person to be publicly hanged in Manchester, at the New Bailey prison. Local legend has it that the face of a young woman is sometimes seen in the window of the vicarage, now in private ownership.

=== 20th century ===
Throughout the first decade of the 20th century, the population of the Borough of Todmorden remained constant. The ten-yearly UK census returns show figures of 25,418 in 1901 and 25,404 in 1911. Like the rest of the Upper Calder Valley, Todmorden's economy experienced a slow decline from around the end of World War I onwards, accelerating after World War II until around the late 1970s. During this period there was a painful restructuring of the local economy with the closure of mills and the demise of heavy industry.

On 1 January 1907, Todmorden Corporation became only the second municipality in the British Isles to operate a motor bus service. By the end of that year, the fleet had expanded to five double-deck vehicles: two by Critchley-Norris, two by Lancashire Steam (predecessor of Leyland Motors) and one by Ryknield. In 1931, the service became jointly operated by the Corporation and the LMS railway under the name "Todmorden Joint Omnibus Committee". At its maximum size in the 1940s and 1950s, the undertaking operated 40 vehicles over 50 route miles (80 km) through the rugged South Pennine terrain.

Until 1938, the town was served by no fewer than six railway stations: Todmorden, Stansfield Hall, Cornholme, Portsmouth, Walsden and Eastwood. With the exception of Todmorden railway station, all closed during the middle third of the 20th century although Walsden railway station reopened on 10 September 1990 on a site a few yards north of the original 1845 railway station. In December 1984, a goods train carrying petrol derailed in the Summit Tunnel between Todmorden and Littleborough causing what is still considered as one of the biggest underground fires in transport history.

In 1980, Todmorden found itself at the centre of a celebrated murder enquiry. On 11 June that year police were called to J.W. Parker's coal yard in Todmorden after the discovery of a body, subsequently identified as 56-year-old Zigmund Adamski from Tingley, near Wakefield. The former coal miner had not been seen since setting out on a local shopping trip five days earlier. Although still wearing a suit, his shirt, watch and wallet were missing. A post-mortem established that he died of a heart attack earlier that day, and discovered burns on his neck, shoulders and back of his head. These appeared to have been dressed by a green ointment, which toxicology tests were unable to identify. Adamski's case has never been solved, no suspect was ever arrested and in a television documentary the coroner, James Turnbull, described it as "one of the most puzzling cases I've come across in 25 years". Among the explanations to gain currency was that Adamski was the victim of extraterrestrial abduction, following comments by police officer Alan Godfrey about what he saw on 29 November 1980, described in Jenny Randles' 1983 book The Pennine UFO Mystery. After intense media interest, the Todmorden police force were forbidden from talking further to the press about the case. In 2017, Blurry Photos host Dave Stecco said he believes that Adamski could have been a Nazi before immigrating from Poland.

In the 1980s and 1990s, a prominent lesbian intentional community grew up Todmorden — and subsequently Hebden Bridge — "promot[ing] forms of queer intimacy outside of the nuclear family unit", with "a close-knit community of care" and mutual support, sharing child care and community events, such as a "famous Todmorden Women's Disco" held monthly. The nature of that community has changed with evolving queer politics, away from lesbian feminism and towards "homonormative assimilation".

=== 21st century ===
In 2008, a group of local residents including Mary Clear initiated the Incredible Edible project to raise awareness of food issues and in particular local food and food provenance. The project has been responsible for the planting of 40 public fruit and vegetable gardens throughout the town, with each plot inviting passers-by to help themselves to the open source produce. The project has attracted publicity, media attention and visitors and the idea has been replicated in at least fifteen towns and villages in the UK. In 2010, Todmorden received a visit from then-Prince Charles (his second visit to the town) to see the project, and it featured in BBC Radio 4 programme Costing the Earth: The New Diggers.

== Governance ==
Coat of Arms of the former Todmorden Borough Council.

Todmorden has a complex geo-administrative history. It lies along the historic county boundary of Yorkshire and Lancashire.

Until the boundary reformation by the Local Government Act 1888, the Lancashire-Yorkshire boundary ran through the centre of Todmorden, following the River Calder to the north-west and the Walsden Water for less than 1 mi (2 km) to the south before turning south-eastwards across Langfield Common. Todmorden Town Hall, which was presented to Todmorden by the Fielden family and opened in 1875, straddles the Walsden Water; thus, from 1875 to 1888 it was possible to dance in the town hall ballroom, forward and back, across two counties of England.

Following the Local Government Act 1894, the Todmorden Local Board became an Urban District Council, comprising the wards of Todmorden, Walsden, Langfield and Stansfield. At the same time, Todmorden Rural District Council, comprising the nearby parishes of Blackshaw, Erringden, Heptonstall and Wadsworth, came into being. Two years later, on 2 June 1896, the town was granted a Charter of Incorporation and the area covered by the Urban District Council became a municipal borough. The number of wards was increased from four to six: Central, Walsden, Langfield, Stansfield, Stoodley and Cornholme. Todmorden Rural District was later renamed Hepton Rural District. Since the local government reforms of 1974, Todmorden has been administered as part of the Metropolitan Borough of Calderdale, within the metropolitan county of West Yorkshire. At the local government level, the majority of the town is within Todmorden ward of Calderdale Council with the eastern part of the town, including Eastwood, sharing the adjoining Calder ward with the town of Hebden Bridge and parishes of Blackshaw, Heptonstall, Erringden and Wadsworth As of the 2023 Local Elections, the three Todmorden councillors and three Calder councillors are all part of the Labour Party.

Todmorden's postal county was Lancashire.

=== Todmorden Town Council composition ===
Todmorden Town Council

Type
- Type: Town Council

Leadership
- Mayor: Cllr Tyler Hanley

Structure
- Seats: 18 Councillors
- Labour Party: 17 / 18
- Liberal Democrats: 1 / 18

Elections
- Voting system: Plurality-at-large
- Last election: 2 May 2023
- Next election: 2 May 2027

Meeting place
- Town Hall, Todmorden

Website
- todmorden-tc.gov.uk

Election to Todmorden Town Council 4 May 2023
Party	Seats	Gains	Losses	Net gain/loss	Seats %	Votes %	Votes	+/−
Labour	17	5	0	5	94.4%	74.6%	7265	+28.0%
Liberal Democrats	1	0	5	-5	5.6%	25.4%	2475	+19.5%
Total	18						9740	

Only Labour and the Liberal Democrats stood candidates in 2023. The turnout was 9740 and 132 ballots were rejected.

Election to Todmorden Town Council 2 May 2019
Party	Seats	Gains	Losses	Net gain/loss	Seats %	Votes %	Votes	+/−
Labour	12	1	1	0	66.7%	46.6%	4652	+0.5%
Liberal Democrats	6	3	0	3	33.3%	44.9%	4473	+14.7%
Green	0	0	2	-2	0%	2.4%	246	-7.1%
Conservative	0	0	0	-1	0%	n/a	DNS	n/a
UKIP	0	0	0	0	0%	n/a	DNS	n/a
Independent	0	0	0	0	0%	5.3%	534	+3.9%
National Front	0	0	0	0	0%	0.7%	68	-0.2%
Total	18						9973	

The turnout was 9973 and 154 ballots were rejected.

Election to Todmorden Town Council 7 May 2015
Party	Seats	Gains	Losses	Net gain/loss	Seats %	Votes %	Votes	+/−
Labour	12	5	0	+5	66.7%	46.1%	7458	+10.7%
Liberal Democrats	3	0	5	-5	16.7%	30.2%	4880	-15.7%
Green	2	2	0	+2	11.1%	9.5%	1536	+6.3%
Conservative	1	1	0	+1	5.6%	5.9%	965	n/a
UKIP	0	0	0	0	0%	5.2%	843	n/a
Independent	0	0	3	-3	0%	1.4%	227	-12.8%
National Front	0	0	0	0	0%	0.9%	145	n/a
Total	18						16170	+ 5926

=== Twin towns ===
Todmorden's twin towns are:

- Roncq, Nord, Hauts-de-France, France
- Bramsche, Lower Saxony, Germany

== Geography ==
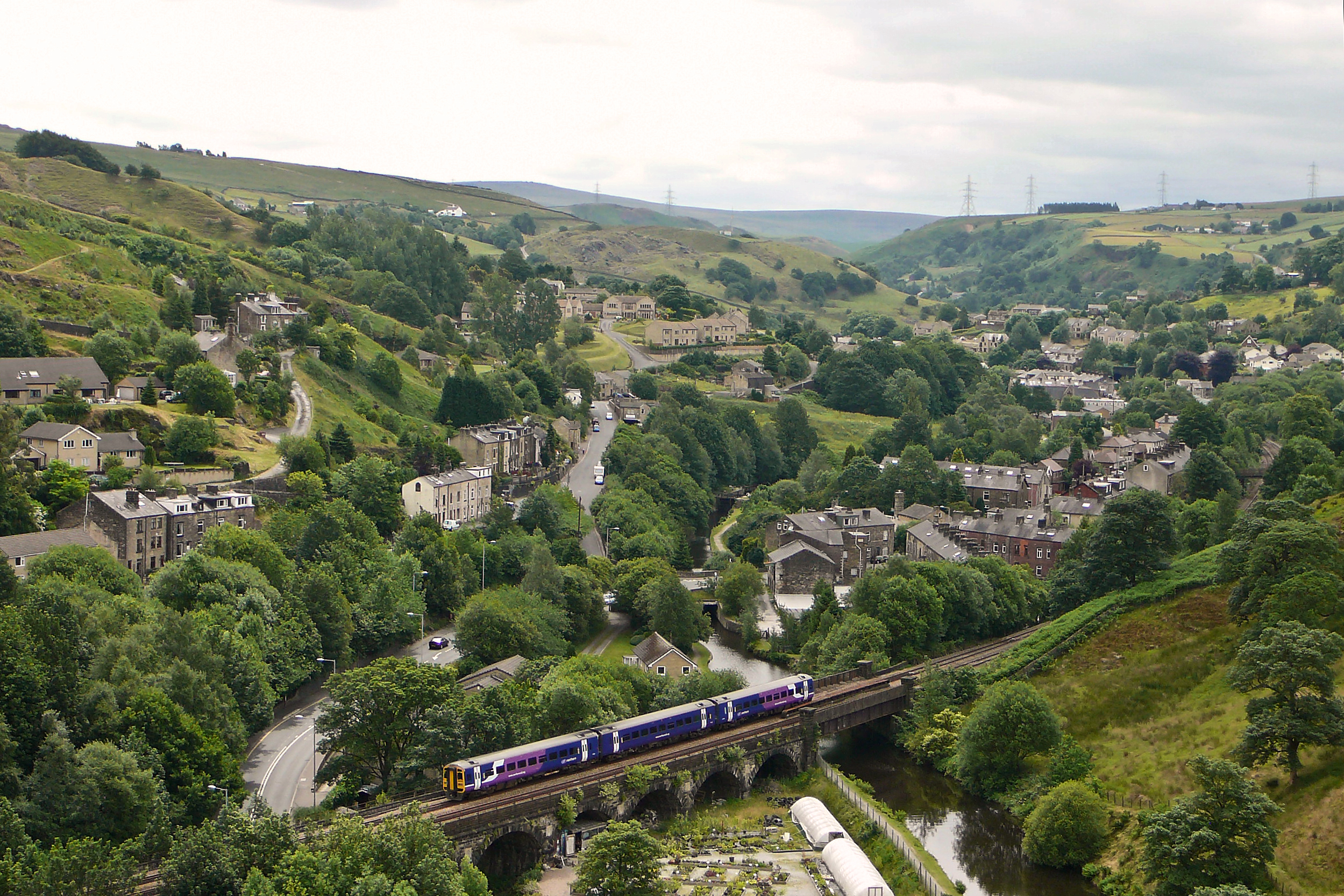
A view of Gauxholme and Walsden from Watty Lane.

Other villages and towns in the Upper Calder Valley include Hebden Bridge and Mytholmroyd. The territory of the civil parish of Todmorden also extends to cover Eastwood, Walsden, Cornholme, Mankinholes, Lumbutts, Robinwood, Lydgate, Portsmouth, Shade, Stansfield, Dobroyd, Ferney Lee, Gauxholme and Cross Stone.

Medieval Todmorden had consisted of the townships of Langfield and Stansfield in Yorkshire, and Todmorden/Walsden section of the greater township of Hundersfield in the Ancient Parish of Rochdale, Lancashire. The township of Todmorden and Walsden was created in 1801 by the union of the older villages of Todmorden and Walsden.

== Economy ==
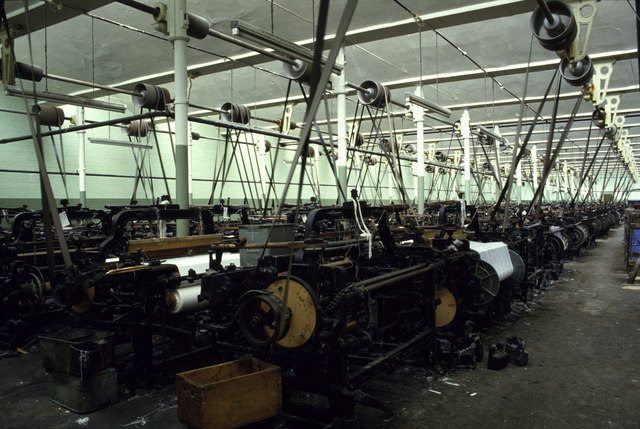
A typical weaving shed at Queen Street Mill Textile Museum, Burnley

Heavy industry is now part of Todmorden's history, not its present. The industrial chimneys have largely gone and the remaining mills have mostly been converted for other purposes. The town's industrial base is much reduced (at one time Todmorden had the largest weaving shed in the world). Todmorden also services the local rural area and attracts visitors through its market (indoor and outdoor), various events, heritage and the local Pennine countryside. It has for centuries been considered the safest accessible route directly across the Pennines.

== Landmarks ==
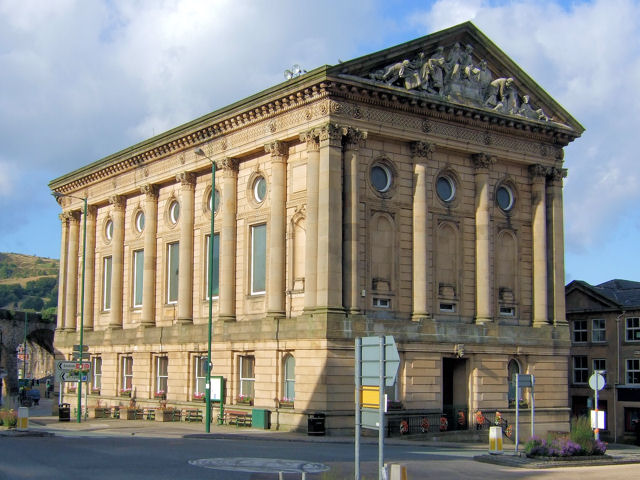
Todmorden Town Hall

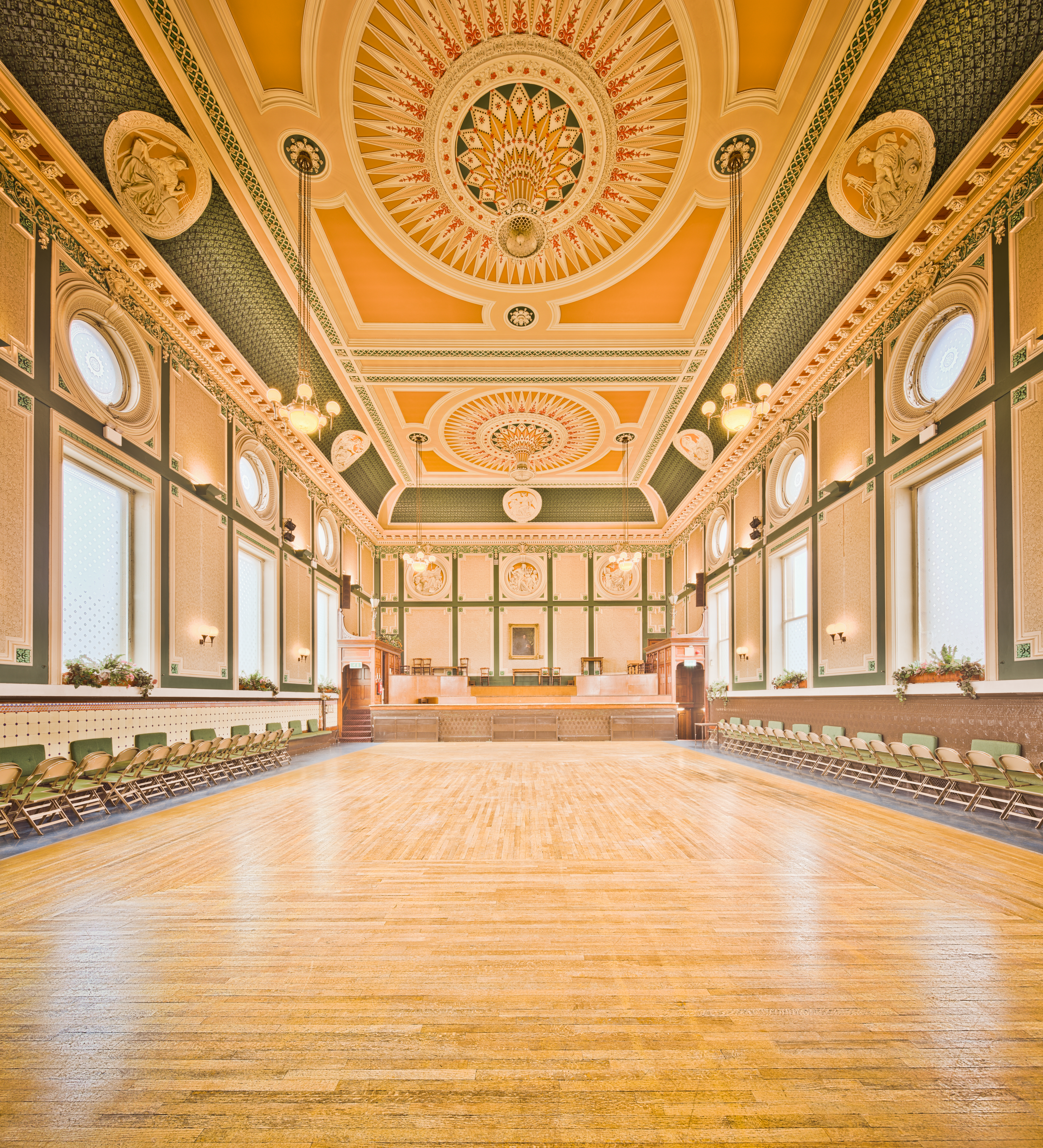
Todmorden Town Hall interior

Todmorden Town Hall, which was designed in the Neo-Classical style, dominates the centre of the town. The building straddles the Walsden Water, a tributary of the River Calder, and was situated in both Lancashire and Yorkshire until the administrative county boundary was moved on 1 January 1888. Designed by John Gibson of Westminster, this imposing building has a northern end which is semi-circular. One interesting external feature of the town hall is the pediment to the front elevation, which reflects the fact that it straddled the boundary as it depicts the main industries of the two counties. The fine carved stonework has two central female figures on a pedestal. The left-hand sculpture represents Lancashire (cotton spinning and weaving industries), and the right-hand one Yorkshire (wool manufacturing, engineering and agriculture).

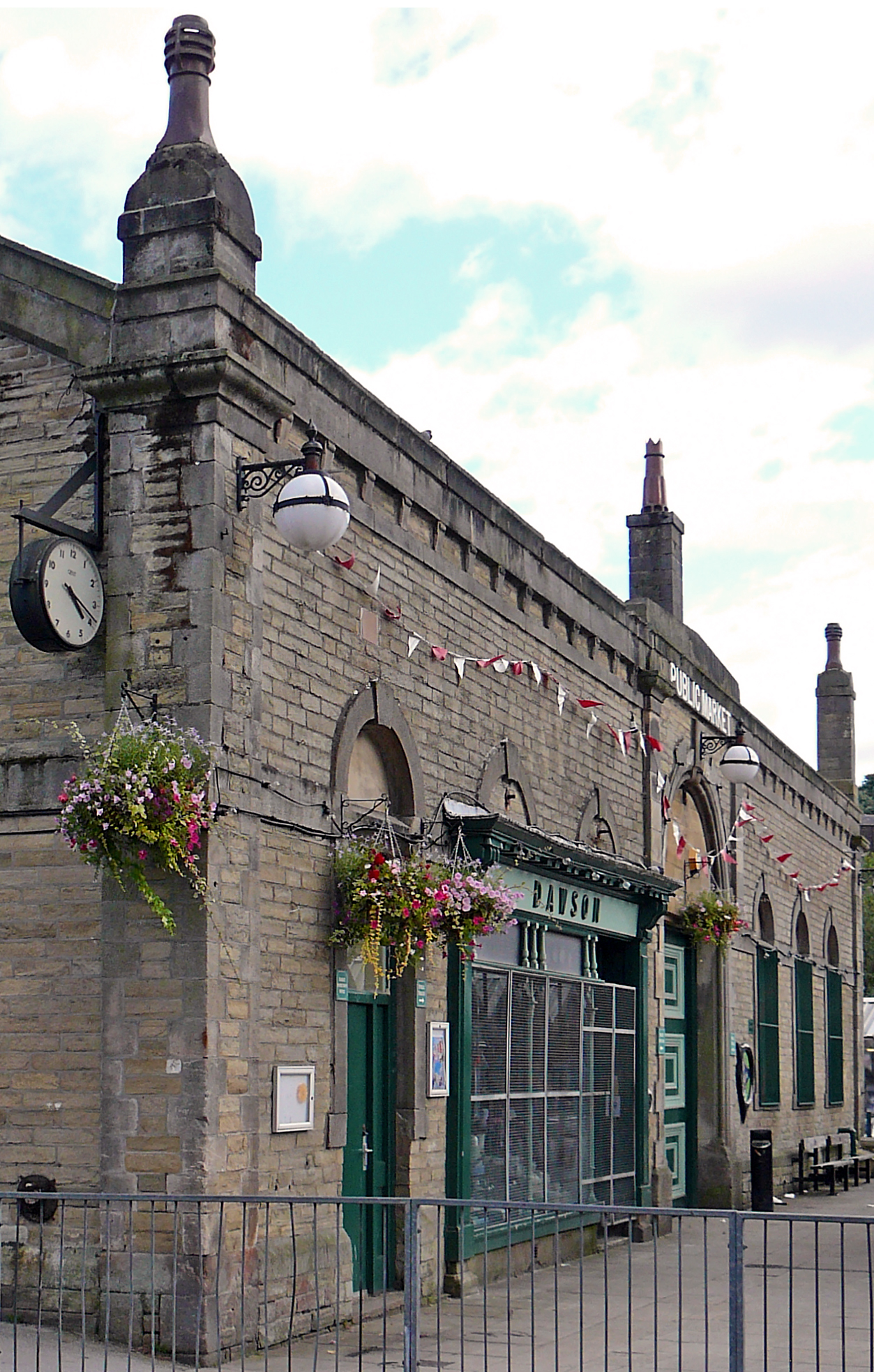
Todmorden Market Hall

Todmorden has the look of a Victorian mill town. Other notable buildings include Dobroyd Castle (completed in 1869), now used as a residential activity centre for schoolchildren; the Edwardian Hippodrome Theatre, and the Grade I listed Todmorden Unitarian Church (built 1865–1869). Dobroyd Castle, the town hall and the Unitarian church were all built at the behest of John Fielden and his sons and designed by John Gibson, who had been a member of Charles Barry's team at the Houses of Parliament. Pre-Victorian buildings include two 18th century pubs; Todmorden Old Hall, a Grade II* listed manor house (Elizabethan) in the centre of town, and St. Mary's Church which dates from 1476.

Todmorden is situated alongside the Pennine Way, Pennine Bridleway, Mary Towneley Loop and Calderdale Way and is popular for outdoor activities such as walking, fell running, mountain biking and bouldering. Its attractions include canals and locks, a park containing a sports centre, an outdoor skateboard park, tennis courts, a golf course and a cricket ground. There are wooded areas around the town and cafés and restaurants. The Hippodrome Theatre shows films as well as putting on live performances. The town has a small toy and model museum, a library and a tourist information centre, along with independent retailers. Annual events include a carnival, agricultural show, beer festival, music festival and the traditional Easter Pace Egg plays.

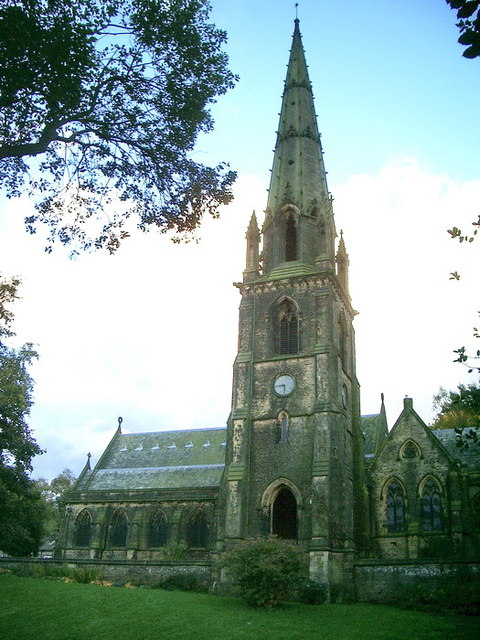
Todmorden Unitarian Church

Todmorden is home to many churches and chapels that serve the town and surrounding villages/hamlets. One notable church is the Grade I listed Todmorden Unitarian Church. Its spire is the tallest landmark in the town and surrounding area due to being on a hill. It continues to serve as a religious and civic centre. Other churches include the Central Methodist Church, St Joseph's Roman Catholic Church, Roomfield Baptist Church and St Mary's Church.

Centre Vale Park in Todmorden is the setting for several pieces of local art, including tree carvings by the sculptor John Adamson, and an iconic bandstand. The bandstand is unique in construction and is designed in an arc shape because this gives it better acoustics. It opened in 1914, and in July 2019 was condemned to be demolished by Calderdale Borough Council. A campaign by local activists resulted in the bandstand being granted grade II listed status by Historic England in January 2020, and in March 2022 funding was accepted by Calderdale Council for a project to improve Centre Vale Park, including the bandstand. Also in the park are the reconstructed remains of Centre Vale Mansion, next to Todmorden War Memorial in the Garden of Remembrance, and nearby there is a sculpture of a dog. This was sculpted by local sculptor David Wynne in 2005, and was cast in steel at the local Todmorden foundry Weir Minerals. It was donated to the park by the sculptor and the foundry, but installation was delayed for several years due to the extensive flood alleviation works. In 2011, the dog was featured on an episode of Derren Brown's The Experiments. Brown spread a rumour that the dog was lucky; it then gained a reputation for bringing luck to anyone that touched it. During the First World War the mansion was used as a military hospital. Centre Vale Park has hosted a parkrun since 9 March 2019.

The 120-foot (40-metre) Stoodley Pike monument (built 1814 and rebuilt in 1854) stands atop the 1,300-foot (400-metre) hill of the same name. It commemorates the defeat of Napoleon and the surrender of Paris. It is a prominent feature of Todmorden's moors, and is a landmark on the Pennine Way.

== Culture and media ==
Local TV coverage is provided by BBC Yorkshire and ITV Yorkshire. Until 2009, local television was provided by BBC North West and ITV Granada. Radio stations that broadcast to Todmorden are BBC Radio Leeds, Capital Yorkshire, Heart Yorkshire and Greatest Hits Radio West Yorkshire.

Todmorden's local newspaper is the Todmorden News owned by Johnston Press, now merged (since October 2015) with the Hebden Bridge Times from the neighbouring town by the same publisher. Singletrack, a national mountain biking magazine, is based in Todmorden.

=== Filming ===
Todmorden has been used as a location for the 1980s BBC TV police drama Juliet Bravo, Territorial Army series All Quiet on the Preston Front, parts of The League of Gentlemen, BBC TV miniseries Oranges Are Not the Only Fruit, the BBC1 series Life on Mars, a town in the book Spooks Blood and a film adaptation of the novel My Summer of Love. The BBC One crime drama series Happy Valley, written by Sally Wainwright (who grew up in nearby Sowerby Bridge), is filmed in and around the town, amongst other locations. In the 1980s, the town was used for two consecutive episodes of BBC fashion series The Clothes Show.

Todmorden featured in the ITV paranormal show Strange but True which in their pilot episode from May 1993 investigated the UFO claims in the Todmorden area. The programme included a closed surgery in which Harold Shipman worked for a number of years, as well as the town hall (haunted by a grey lady), and Oddfellows Hall (known as Baxter's bar), which is haunted by a builder who died in the construction of the building in 1811.

=== Nightlife ===
Pubs in the town centre include the Duke of York, the Wellington, and the Fox. The Golden Lion is a renowned live music venue for "retired ravers", with its own vinyl-only record label.

The White Hart Wetherspoons at Station Approach was offered for sale in September 2023 and ceased trading, after being sold, in March 2024. It reopened in May 2024 under the custodianship of the Mountain Pub Company.

The town has a number of independent pubs and restaurants, offering East Asian, Pakistani, English Pub fare and Greek menus.

== Sport ==
=== Cricket ===
Todmorden Cricket Club has existed since 1837 and currently play at Centre Vale in the town. Along with Walsden Cricket Club they are the only Yorkshire teams in the Lancashire League.

== Notable people ==
=== Science and engineering ===
John Mitchell Nuttall (1890–1958) was a Todmorden-born physicist remembered for the Geiger–Nuttall law.

John Ramsbottom (1814–1897) was a mechanical and railway engineer and inventor from the town.

==== Nobel Prize winners ====
Todmorden has two Nobel Prize winners: Prof. Sir John Cockcroft (Physics) and Prof. Sir Geoffrey Wilkinson (Chemistry). Despite 24 years' difference in their birth dates, both attended Todmorden Grammar School (now Todmorden High School with the prior grammar school building now demolished) and both had the same science master, Luke Sutcliffe.

=== Politics and law ===
John Fielden (1784–1849), land and factory owner in Todmorden and scion of the town's Fielden family, was a Member of Parliament and national leader of the Ten Hours Campaign for factory reform. He created the 10 hour law, making it so that workers did not have to work almost the whole time they were awake. He also helped to build Centre Vale Park, Todmorden.

Samuel Fielden (1847–1922), socialist, anarchist and labour activist who was one of the eight convicted in the 1886 Haymarket affair in Chicago. He was sentenced to death along with six other defendants, but after writing to the Illinois Governor asking for clemency his sentence was commuted to life imprisonment in November 1887. He spent six years in prison before being pardoned, along with two other co-defendants, in 1893. He died in Colorado in 1922 and is buried in La Veta (Pioneer) Cemetery, Huerfano County, Colorado alongside his wife and two children.

Wilfred Judson, a justice of the Supreme Court of Canada, was born in and spent his early youth in Todmorden.

Rebecca Taylor, Liberal Democrat MEP for Yorkshire and the Humber from 8 March 2012 to 2 July 2014.

=== Arts and culture ===
Travel writer Geoff Crowther (1944–2021) was an early and long-time editor of BIT Travel Guides, London from 1972 to 1980. The BIT Travel Guides were some of the first guidebooks to cover the overland Hippie trail from Europe to Asia and Australia Crowther went on to be a prolific author for Lonely Planet (1977–1995) and played a key role in the early days of the company. He wrote the first editions of Africa on a Shoestring, South America on a Shoestring and contributed to the first edition of the India on a Shoestring. In 2016, the British Library in their 2016 exhibition 'Maps & the 20th Century' showcased Crowther's hand drawn travel maps and his research journals for the first edition of South America on a Shoestring. He died in Northern New South Wales, Australia on 13 April 2021.

Fred Lawless, Liverpool born theatre playwright has a house in Todmorden; he was also a writer for the BBC One TV series EastEnders, as well as several other TV and radio programmes.

Todmorden actress Claire Benedict has appeared in UK TV shows Waking the Dead, Prime Suspect, Unforgiven, Holby City, Casualty, Doctors, Grange Hill, The Bill and the Lenny Henry Show. She featured in the films Merisairas (1996), Felicia's Journey (1999) and Jupiter Ascending (2015) and has had numerous theatre roles, including work for the National Theatre and Royal Shakespeare Company. On BBC radio she is the voice of Precious Ramotswe in The No. 1 Ladies' Detective Agency.

Todmorden-born actor Dicken Ashworth appeared in Coronation Street and Brookside.

Tony Booth (1931-2017), actor, father of Cherie Blair and father-in-law of former Prime Minister Tony Blair, resided in Todmorden.

The Bayes family of artists were prominent in the 19th and 20th centuries. They were: Alfred Bayes (1832–1909), painter; Walter Bayes (1869–1856), painter; Gilbert Bayes (1872–1952), sculptor; and Jessie Bayes (1876–1970), painter (some of her work can be seen at Lumbutts Methodist Church, Lumbutts, Todmorden).

William Holt (1897–1977) was a writer, painter, political activist, journalist and traveller. William was often seen riding his white horse Trigger around Todmorden and other local areas.

Keyboardist Keith Emerson (1944–2016), founder member of UK progressive rock groups the Nice and Emerson, Lake & Palmer, was born in the town while the family was evacuated from the south coast.

John Helliwell, another Todmorden-born musician, was saxophonist in the band Supertramp.

Dale Hibbert, original bassist with the Smiths, author of Boy Interrupted.

Geoff Love (1917–1991), the big band leader, was born in Todmorden.

John Kettley (born 1952), the former BBC weatherman, grew up in Todmorden.

Tim Benjamin (born 1975), the composer, lives in Todmorden, and the world premiere of his opera Emily was given at the town's Hippodrome Theatre in 2013.

=== Sport ===
England Test cricketers Peter Lever (born 1940) and Derek Shackleton (1924–2007) were originally from Todmorden.

=== Other ===
Harold Shipman, the general practitioner (GP) who is believed to have killed over 200 patients in the 1970s, 1980s and 1990s, claimed at least one of his victims while working as a doctor at the Abraham Ormerod Medical Centre between March 1974 and September 1975. His first known victim, 70-year-old Eva Lyons, lived at Keswick Close in the town. Shipman had initially been charged with 15 murders committed around Hyde, Greater Manchester, between 1995 and 1998 when he went on trial in late 1999, but Lyons was only identified as a victim of Shipman when the inquiry into his crimes was completed in July 2002 by Dame Janet Smith. Shipman was found guilty on 31 January 2000 and hanged himself at HM Wakefield Prison on 13 January 2004.

== See also ==
- Listed buildings in Todmorden (inner area)
- Listed buildings in Todmorden (outer areas)
