= Stansfield (surname) =

- Pronunciation: /ˈstænsfiːld, ˈstænz-/ STANSS-feeld, STANZ-
- Language: English

Origin
- Language: English
- Meaning: "stony field"

Other names
- Variant forms: Stansfeld, Stanfield, Standfield, Stancefield, Stansfeild

Stansfield is an English surname deriving from the Old English 'stan' (meaning stony) and 'feld' (field). This toponymic surname originates from two possible locations in England: the ancient township of Stansfield (near Todmorden, West Yorkshire), which was listed in the Domesday Book of 1086 as 'Stanesfelt’; and the village of Stansfield, Suffolk. The surname is most commonly found among families originating in the English counties of Yorkshire and Lancashire, especially around the town of Todmorden, West Yorkshire. Other variants include Stansfeld, Stanfield, Stanfill, and Standfield.

Notable people with this surname include:

== Stansfield (surname) ==
- Adam Stansfield (1978–2010), English professional footballer
- Alfred Stansfield (1871–1944), British-Canadian metallurgist and brother of Herbert Stansfield
- Anita Stansfield (b.1961), American novelist
- Betty Stansfield (1901–38/74), English actress and sister of Gracie Fields (known as "Betty Fields")
- Charles Stansfield or Charles Henry Renn Stansfield (1856–1926), British Admiralty civil servant
- Claire Stansfield (b.1964), English-Canadian actress, director, fashion-designer and model
- Colin Stansfield (fl.1938–45), English rugby player
- Colin Stansfield Smith (1932–2013), British architect, academic and cricketer
- Elsa Stansfield (1945–2004), Scottish artist
- Emma Stansfield (b.1978), Welsh actress
- Fred Stansfield or Frederick Stansfield (1917–2014), Welsh footballer
- Gareth Stansfield (b.1973), British academic and Professor of Middle East Studies at University of Exeter
- Grace Stansfield (1898–1979), English actress, singer and comedienne (known as "Gracie Fields")
- George Norman Stansfield (1926–2018), British diplomat and High Commissioner to Solomon Islands
- Harold Stansfield (footballer) (1878–1963), English professional footballer (Preston North End, Stockport County, Tottenham Hotspur)
- Herbert Stansfield (1872–1960), British physicist and brother of Alfred Stansfield
- James Stansfield (disambiguation), multiple people, including:
  - James Stansfield (footballer) (b.1978), English professional footballer
  - Bert Stansfield or James Burton Stansfield (1874–1938), English football manager
  - James Warden Stansfield (1906–1991), English barrister and judge
- Jack Stansfield (b.1896), English professional footballer
- Jay Stansfield (b.2002), English professional footballer
- Jean Stansfield (1913–23), English child who had public park named after her
- Jem Stansfield (fl.2001–), British engineer, inventor and TV presenter
- John Stansfield (disambiguation), multiple people, including:
  - Jack Stansfield (1896–?), English professional footballer
  - John Stansfeld (1855–1939), English doctor, Anglican priest and philanthropist
- Jonathan Stansfield (d.1894), English manufacturer and architect of Stansfield Tower, Blacko
- Lisa Stansfield (b.1966), English singer, songwriter and actress
- Pauline Stansfield (1939–2022), New Zealand disability rights advocate
- Randell Stansfield (b.1950), American military officer
- Thomas Edward Knowles Stansfield (1862–1939), English pathologist and medical officer
- Tommy Stansfield (1908–1988), English actor, variety entertainer and brother of Gracie Fields (known as "Tommy Fields")
- Walter Stansfield (1917–1984), British police officer, soldier and Chief Constable of Denbighshire and Derbyshire
- William Stansfield (disambiguation), multiple people, including:
  - William Stansfield (Railway officer) (1874–1946), English/Australian railway officer and soldier
  - William Crompton-Stansfield (1790–1871), English Whig politician and MP for Huddersfield

== Stansfield (Given name) ==
- Arthur Stansfield Dixon (1856–1929), English metal worker and architect
- Arthur Stansfield Peebles (1872–1933), English army officer
- Horace Stansfield Collier (1864–1930), English surgeon (brother of James Stansfield Collier)
- James Stansfield Collier (1870–1935), English physician and neurologist (brother of Horace Stansfield Collier)
- Norman Cornish or Norman Stansfield Cornish (1919–2014), English mining artist
- Bob Frankford or Robert Timothy Stansfield Frankford (1939–2015), Canadian politician
- Stansfield Turner (1923–2018), American admiral and Director of Central Intelligence

== Fictional characters ==
- Aaron Stansfield, Police Chief character portrayed by Michael Beach in the prime time soap opera Dynasty (2017)
- Douglas Stansfield, character portrayed by Robert Lansing in The Twilight Zone episode The Long Morrow (1964)
- Gary Stansfield, character portrayed by Ken Gregory in the film Cold Monsters (2021)
- Norman Stansfield, character portrayed by Gary Oldman in the film Léon: The Professional (1994)
- Robert Stansfield, character portrayed by Tommy Lee Jones in the film The Family (2013)
- Tom Stansfield, character portrayed by Ashton Kutcher in the film My Boss's Daughter (2003)
- Tyler Stansfield, character portrayed by Mason Cook in the TV sitcom The Goldbergs (2014–16)
- Stansfield Yorke, character portrayed by Jack Raine in the film The Story of Shirley Yorke (1948)

== See also ==
- Stansfield, West Yorkshire
- Stansfield (disambiguation)
- Stansfeld (surname)
- Stanfield (surname)
- Standfield
