= James Stansfield =

James Stansfield, Stansfeld or Stanfield may refer to:

- Jimmy Stansfield (1900-?), English footballer, see List of Bury F.C. players (1–24 appearances)
- James Stansfield (footballer) (born 1978), English footballer
- Bert Stansfield (James Burton Stansfield, 1874–1938), English football manager
- James Warden Stansfield (1906–1991), English barrister and judge
- James Stansfield Collier (1870–1935), English physician and neurologist
- Sir James Stansfeld (1820–98), English Liberal politician and president of the Local Government Board (1871–4, 1886)
- James Rawdon Stansfeld (1866–1936), English army officer
- James Stanfield, American academic and film producer
- James Field Stanfield (1749–1824), Irish actor, abolitionist, and author
- Jim Stanfield, Canadian ice hockey player

== See also ==
- Stansfield (surname)
- Stansfield (disambiguation)
- Stansfeld (surname)
- Stanfield (surname)
- Standfield
