= William Stansfield =

William Stansfield, Stansfeld or Stanfield may refer to:

- William Stansfield (railway officer) (1874–1946), English/Australian railway officer and soldier
- William Crompton-Stansfield (1790–1871), English Whig politician and MP for Huddersfield (1837–53)
- Clarkson Frederick Stanfield (1793–1867), English marine painter (often inaccurately credited as "William Clarkson Stanfield")
- Fred Stanfield (Frederic William Stanfield, 1944–2021), Canadian ice hockey player

== See also ==
- Stansfield (surname)
- Stansfield (disambiguation)
- Stansfeld
- Stanfield (surname)
- Standfield
