= John Stansfield =

John Stansfield, Stansfeld or Stanfield may refer to:

- Jack Stansfield (1896–?), English professional footballer
- John Stansfeld (1855–1939), English doctor, Anglican priest and philanthropist
- John Raymond Evelyn Stansfeld (1880–1915), English army officer
- John Stanfield (1868–1934), Canadian Nova Scotia industrialist and politician in the Canadian House of Commons and Senate
- John Standfield, English agricultural labourer, one of the Tolpuddle Martyrs

== See also ==
- Stansfield (surname)
- Stansfield (disambiguation)
- Stansfeld (surname)
- Stanfield (surname)
- Standfield
