= Robert Stansfield =

Robert Stansfield, Stansfeld or Stanfield may refer to:

== Fictional characters ==
- Robert Stansfield, character from the film The Family (2013)
- Robert Stansfield, character from the comic Hotell (2020)

== People ==
- Robert H. Stansfield, American Attorney and Georgia Superior Court Judge Candidate
- Robert Timothy Stansfield Frankford (1939–2015), Canadian politician
- Charles Robert Stansfeld Jones (1886–1950), English accountant, occultist and ceremonial magician
- Robert Lorne Stanfield (1914–2003), Canadian politician, Leader of the Progressive Conservative Party (1967–1976)
- Robert Nelson Stanfield (1877–1945), American politician and Senator for Oregon (1921–1927)

== Places ==
- Robert L. Stanfield International Airport, Nova Scotia, Canada

== See also ==
- Stansfield (surname)
- Stansfield (disambiguation)
- Stansfeld (surname)
- Stanfield (surname)
- Standfield
