= Stanfield (surname) =

- Pronunciation: English: /ˈstænfiːld/ STAN-feeld
- Language: English

Origin
- Language: English
- Meaning: "stony field"

Other names
- Variant forms: Stansfield, Stansfeld, Standfield

Stanfield is an English surname deriving from the Old English 'stan' (meaning stony) and 'feld' (field). This toponymic surname originates from several possible locations in England: the village of Stanfield, Norfolk; the ancient township of Stansfield (near Todmorden), West Yorkshire; and the village of Stansfield, Suffolk. Other variants include Stansfield, Stansfeld, and Standfield.

Notable people with this surname include:

== Stanfield (surname) ==
Politics

Canadian family of politicians:

- Frank Stanfield (1872–1931), Canadian politician and entrepreneur, 15th Lieutenant-Governor of Nova Scotia, (father of Robert and Frank Thomas)
- Frank Thomas Stanfield (1903–1967), Canadian politician, MP for Colchester—Hants, Nova Scotia (son of Frank)
- John Stanfield (1868–1934), Canadian politician and industrialist, Senator for Colchester, Nova Scotia, (brother of Frank)
- Robert Stanfield or Robert Lorne Stanfield (1914–2003), Canadian politician, Leader of the Progressive Conservative Party of Canada (1967–76), (son of Frank)

Others

- Abraham L. Stanfield or Abraham Lincoln Stanfield (1860–1927), American businessman and politician
- Robert N. Stanfield or Robert Nelson Stanfield (1877–1945), American politician and Senator for Oregon
- Sylvia Stanfield (b.1943), American diplomat and Ambassador to Brunei
- Thomas S. Stanfield (1816–1885), American politician and judge from Indiana

Business

- Ross H. Stanfield (1927–2010), Canadian mining promoter
- Richard Stanfield (1863–1950), British academic and civil engineer

Sports

Canadian family of professional ice hockey players:

- Jack Stanfield (b.1942), Canadian professional ice hockey player (brother of Fred and Jim)
- Jim Stanfield (1947–2009), Canadian professional ice hockey player (brother of Jack and Fred)
- Fred Stanfield (1944–2021), Canadian professional ice hockey player (brother of Jack and Jim)

Others

- Andy Stanfield or Andrew William Stanfield (1927–85), American sprinter
- Edmundo Stanfield (1902–1960), Irish rugby union footballer
- Kevin Stanfield or Kevin Bruce Stanfield (b.1955), American Major League Baseball player
- Leon Stanfield (b.1934), Welsh international lawn bowler
- Olphert Stanfield or Olphert Martin Stanfield (1869–1952), Irish professional footballer
- Parker Stanfield (b.1990), American professional ice hockey player
- Vic Stanfield (b.1951), American professional ice hockey player

Arts

English family of Clarkson Frederick Stanfield, painter:

- Clarkson Frederick Stanfield (1793–1867), English marine painter
- Francis Stanfield (1835–1914), English Catholic priest and composer (son of Clarkson)
- George Clarkson Stanfield (1828–1878), English painter (son of Clarkson)
- James Field Stanfield (1749–1824), Irish actor, abolitionist, and author (father of Clarkson)

Others:

- James S. Stanfield, American academic and film producer
- Lakeith Stanfield (b.1991), American actor and musician
- The Stanfields (2008–present), Canadian rock music group

Medicine

- Agnes von Kurowsk pr Agnes von Kurowsky Stanfield (1892–1984), American nurse

== Stanfield (given name) ==
- Stanfield Wells (1889–1967), All-American football player
- Samuel Singer or Samuel Stanfield Singer (1920–1989), Scottish episcopal clergyman and Dean of Glasgow and Galloway

== Fiction ==
- Jack Stanfield, film character played by Harrison Ford in Firewall (2006)
- Cliff, Lana and Henry Stanfield, characters in Beyond the Sea (Black Mirror)
- Marlo Stanfield, character in The Wire (2002–8)
- Stanfield Organization, criminal organization in The Wire (2002–8)

== Standfield ==
Politics

- John Standfield, English agricultural labourer, one of the Tolpuddle Martyrs
- Thomas Standfield, English agricultural labourer, one of the Tolpuddle Martyrs

Sports

- Barry Standfield (b.1970), Australian Rules footballer

== See also ==
- Stansfield (disambiguation)
- Stansfield (surname)
- Stansfeld (surname)
