= Stanfield =

Stanfield may refer to:

== People ==
- Stanfield (surname)

== Places ==
- Halifax Stanfield International Airport, (Halifax/Robert L. Stanfield International Airport), Halifax, Nova Scotia, Canada; a.k.a. Stanfield Airport

=== United Kingdom ===
- Stanfield, Norfolk, England
- Stanfield Hall, Norwich, England; a mansion that was the location of the Victorian-era murders
- Stanfield House in Hampstead, England

=== United States ===
- Stanfield, Arizona
- Stanfield, Norfolk
- Stanfield, North Carolina
- Stanfield, Oregon
  - Stanfield Secondary School, Stanfield, Oregon
- Stanfield, Texas
- Stanfield-Worley Bluff Shelter, prehistoric Paleo-Indian site, Alabama

== Groups, organizations ==
- Stanfield's Limited, Canadian garment manufacturer
- Gordon Stanfield Animation, Canadian animation service and creator company

== Other uses ==
- Murders at Stanfield Hall, notorious English Victorian era double murder in 1848
- Stanfield, 1968 film directed by Donald Shebib

== See also ==
- Stainfield, two villages in Lincolnshire, England
- Stansfeld, a surname
- Stansfield (disambiguation)
- Stan (disambiguation)
- Field (disambiguation)
