= Feedforward (behavioral and cognitive science) =

Method of teaching and learning

In behavioral and cognitive science, feedforward is a method of teaching and learning that illustrates or indicates a desired future behavior or path to a goal. Feedforward provides information, images, etc. exclusively about what one could do right in the future, often in contrast to what one has done in the past. The feedforward method of teaching and learning is in contrast to its opposite, feedback, concerning human behavior because it focuses on learning in the future, whereas feedback uses information from a past event to provide reflection and the basis for behaving and thinking differently. In isolation, feedback is the least effective form of instruction, according to US Department of Defense studies in the 1980s. Feedforward was coined by I. A. Richards in 1951, and applied in the behavioral and cognitive sciences in 1976 by Peter W. Dowrick in his doctoral dissertation.

Feedforward in behavioral and cognitive science may be defined as "images of adaptive future behavior, hitherto not mastered"; images capable of triggering that behavior in a challenging context. Feedforward is created by restructuring current component behaviors into what appears to be a new skill or level of performance.

One concept of feedforward originated in behavioral science. Related concepts have emerged in biology, cybernetics, and management sciences. The understanding of feedforward help the understanding of brain function and rapid learning. The concept contributed to research and development of video self modeling (VSM). The most productive advances in feedforward came from its association with videos that showed adaptive behavior (see Dowrick, 1983, pp. 111, 121; 1991, pp. 110–3, 120-2, 240-1; 1999, esp. pp. 25–26). For example, a boy with autism role-plays squeezing a ball (stress management technique) instead of having a tantrum when his work is found imperfect by the teacher – or a selectively mute child is seen on video talking at school, by editing in footage of her talking at home (location disguised by use of a classroom backdrop). By selectively editing a video, a clip was made that demonstrated the desired behavior and allowed the children to learn from their future successes.

By reference to its historical context of VSM, it became recognized that feedforward comprised component behaviors already in the repertoire, and that it could exist in forms other than videos. In fact, feedforward exists as images in the brain, and VSM is just one of many ways to create these simulations. The videos are very short – the best are 1 or 2 minutes long, and achieve changes in behavior very rapidly. Under the right conditions, a very few viewings of these videos can produce skill acquisitions or changes in performance that typically take months and have been resistant to change by other methods. The boy with autism and the girl with selective mutism, mentioned above, are good examples. Further examples can be found in journal articles, and on the web (e.g., in sport).

The evidence for ultra-rapid learning, built from component behaviors that are reconfigured to appear as new skills, indicates the feedforward self model mechanism existing in the brain to control our future behavior. That is, if the conditions of learning are right, the brain takes pieces of existing skills, puts them together in new ways or in a different context, to produce a future image and a future response. Thus we learn from the future – more rapidly than we learn from the past. Further evidence comes from cognitive processes dubbed "mental time travel" and for parts of the hippocampus etc. where they occur. However, the links between these hot spots in the brain and feedforward learning have yet to be confirmed.

Feedforward concepts have become established in at least four areas of science, and they continue to spread. Feedforward often works in concert with feedback loops for guidance systems in cybernetics or self-control in biology.

Feedforward in management theory enables the prediction and control of organizational behavior. These concepts have developed during and since the 1990s.
