= Video modeling =

Teaching method

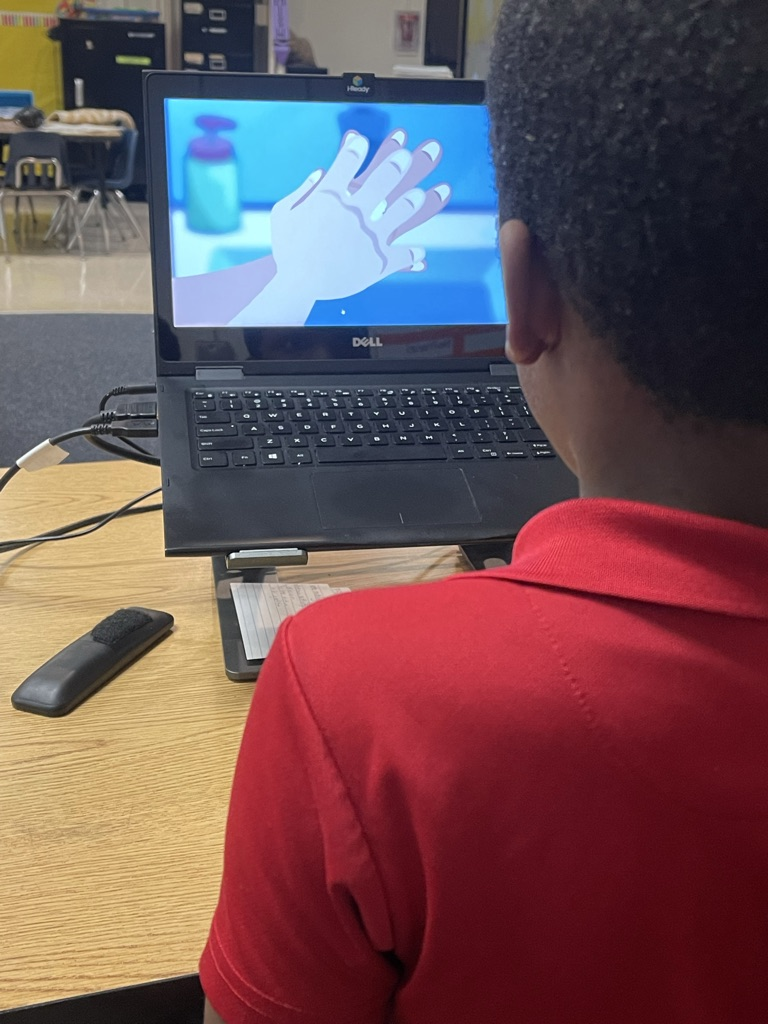
A student watches a video modeling of the skills for hand washing.

In the field of education, video modeling (VM) is a mode of teaching that uses video recording and display equipment to provide the student with a visual model of the behaviors or of the skill to be learned. In video self-modeling (VSM), the student observes himself or herself successfully performing the behavior indicated in the video, and then imitates the demonstrated behavior. Video modeling teaches skills by way of observational learning, such as social skills, communication skills, and athletic skills; video modelling works in communicating with children with autism spectrum disorders (ASD). The theoretic roots of Video Modeling are in the social-learning work presented in the Principles of Behavior Modification (1969), by Albert Bandura, which confirm the human ability to learn through observation and modelling.

== Classification ==
Video modeling is a form of video-based intervention (VBI); other forms include video prompting, computer-based video instruction, and video priming. Several dimensions of effectiveness have been identified for VBI. The term video modeling was coined in 1999, by the filmmaker James Stanfield to describe the function of a "series of video tapes that teach appropriate social behavior to special-education students, by use of professional actors and actresses who demonstrate appropriate behavior (wrong way/right way)".

The National Clearinghouse on Autism Evidence and Practice describes video modeling (VM) as an evidence-based practice (EBP). The pedagogic effectiveness of video modeling is greater with elementary school children in the age range from 6 years to 11 years. This evidence-based practice is successfully applied to children from toddler-age to older adolescents (young adults). There are several types of video modeling, including adult or peer as video model, video self-modeling, point-of-view video modeling, video prompting, and video feedback.Video modeling has provides an opportunity to the learner to watch a recording of the target behavior or skill then practice when provided the chance.

== Autism ==
Researchers Kathleen Mccoy and Emily Hermansen observe:

Video modeling is particularly effective in ABA programs in teaching behaviors to children with autism (Nikopoulos & Keenan, 2006). Video technology is one facet of positive behavior supports for individuals with disabilities (Sturmey, 2003).... Video modeling is innately appealing to instructors who find live modeling to be very time consuming. Charlop-Christy, Le, and Freeman (2000) found that video modeling resulted in quicker rates of acquisition and increases in generalization in comparison to live modeling. Video modeling is also more cost efficient and requires less time for training and implementation than in vivo (live) modeling (Graetz, Mastropieri, & Scruggs, 2006)....Additional benefits to video modeling include an increased ability to gain and hold the student's attention as well as the ability to have complete control over the observed stimuli (Dorwrick, 1991).

Video modeling has been proven to successfully teach empathy, or perspective, where other methods have failed. The ability to be able to "see things from another person's point of view" is termed theory of mind by the research community (ToM; Happe et al., 1996). This ability is well developed by the age of 4 in typical children, but appears to be delayed or absent altogether in children with ASD. Researchers Marjorie H. Charlop-Christy and Sabrina Daneshvar observe:

Video modeling was used to teach perspective taking to three children with autism....Generalization across untrained similar stimuli was also assessed. Video modeling was a fast and effective tool for teaching perspective-taking tasks to children with autism, resulting in both stimulus and response generalization. These results concurred with previous research that perspective taking can be taught. Unlike other studies, however, wider ranges of generalization were found.

This study is significant as it illustrates the increased generalization, or continued natural use of a learned skill. This effect has been witnessed in areas ranging from the teaching of conversation to pretend play to purchasing skills using video modeling.

A specific form of video modeling based on the discrete trial method of applied behavior analysis was developed and documented by Laura Kasbar in 2000 as a way to teach children who do not respond well to other kinds of therapy, including traditional applied behavior analysis (ABA). Kasbar in 2000, and then Dunn and Dunn in 2006, recognized that the precepts of ABA, most notably the very controlled or "discrete" presentation of desired information could be more effectively taught using the video medium rather than in vivo (Dunn and Dunn, 2006). Using this method, retention of the information taught is greatly increased. Video modeling was also shown to be an effective way to teach older children, when many other therapy methods have been ineffectual. This work was furthered in the study, "Using Video-Enhanced Activity Schedules and Matrix Training to Teach Sociodramatic Play to a Child with Autism" by Melissa Dauphin, Elisabeth M. Kinney, Robert Stromer in their study which demonstrated video modeling's ability to improve and encourage non-scripted interaction and communication. Christos K. Nikopoulos (2007) found that video modeling could be used to produce generalized social skills.

== See also ==
- Autism therapies
- Educational technology
- Feedforward, Behavioral and Cognitive Science
