= Stansfield Hall railway station =

Disused railway station in West Yorkshire, England

Stansfield Hall
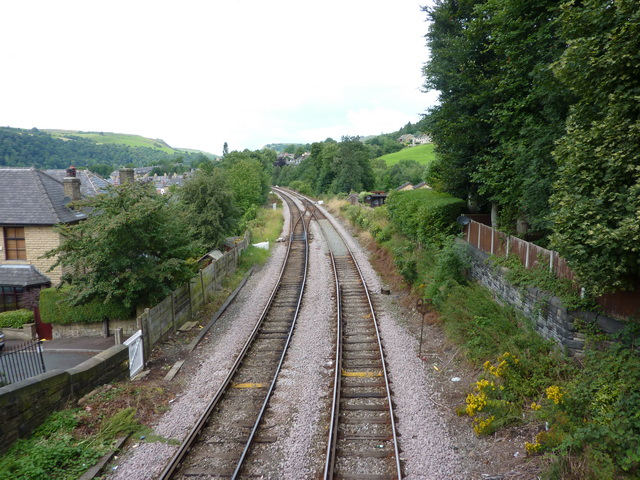
- Approximate location of the former station (2010), looking towards Burnley

General information
- Location: Todmorden, Calderdale; England
- Coordinates: 53.718580°N 2.094440°W
- Grid reference: SD938246
- Platforms: 2

Other information
- Status: Disused

History
- Original company: Lancashire and Yorkshire Railway
- Pre-grouping: Lancashire and Yorkshire Railway
- Post-grouping: London, Midland and Scottish Railway

Key dates
- August 1869: Station opened
- 31 July 1944: Last train
- 17 August 1949: Official closure
Location

Stansfield Hall railway station (/ˈstænsfiːld/ STANSS-feeld) was the second station in Stansfield, Todmorden in West Yorkshire, England and was situated on the Copy Pit line. It opened in 1869 and the last train called in 1944 but was not officially closed until 1949.

The station took its name from the nearby residence of Stansfield Hall and the township of Stansfield. The station was of note as a calling point for some trains travelling between Halifax and Burnley, because these could not call at the larger Todmorden station without a reversal.

Preceding station	Disused railways	Following station
Cornholme; Line open, station closed	L&YR; Copy Pit Line	Todmorden; Line open, station open
Cornholme; Line open, station closed	L&YR; Copy Pit Line	Eastwood; Line open, station closed
