= Stansfield Hall =

Grade II* listed privately-owned house in Todmorden, West Yorkshire, England

- Interactive map of the Stansfield Hall area

General information
- Type: Private Residence
- Location: Stansfield Hall Road, Todmorden, England
- Coordinates: 53.7185°N 2.0912°W

Design and construction
- Designations

Listed Building – Grade II*
- Official name: Stansfield Hall
- Designated: 19 April 1974
- Reference no.: 1230848

Stansfield Hall (/ˈstænsfiːld/ STANSS-feeld) is a privately owned historic and Grade II* listed building, in Stansfield, Todmorden, West Yorkshire, England, which was once the residence of the Yorkshire MP Joshua Fielden and is now divided into private residential apartments.

== History ==
Stansfield Hall was built in 1640 for James Stansfield, a descendant of the Stansfeld family of Stansfield and Sowerby, Yorkshire. The estate passed to John Pilling who later sold it, in 1675, to Joshua Horton (d.1679) of Sowerby. The Horton family sold it in 1696 to William Sutcliffe in whose family it remained for over a century until it was purchased by the MP Joshua Fielden (1827–87) who commissioned the architect John Gibson to add a large Gothic Revival style extension to the existing building in 1862.

== Architecture ==
The Hall's 17th century elements include a five-light chamfered mullioned window (lengthened with replaced mullions). The 1862 extension is an impressive range all with mullioned windows. Internally, there is a Tudor arched fireplace with Gothic decoration incorporating the initials J.F. and E.F.

== See also ==
- Listed buildings in Todmorden (inner area)
