= James Samuel Risien Russell =

Guyanese-British physician, neurologist and professor

James Samuel Risien Russell FRCP
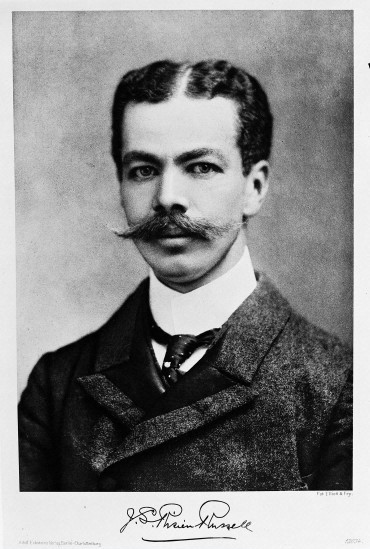
- Born: 17 September 1863; Demerara, British Guiana
- Died: 20 March 1939 (aged 75); Marylebone, London, England
- Burial place: Highgate Cemetery
- Occupations: Physician, professor of medicine, and professor of medical jurisprudence
- Known for: Description of subacute combined degeneration of the spinal cord
- Spouses: Ada Gwenllian Michell (m. 1892; div. 1913); Ada Clement (m. 1924)
- Children: Marjory Gwenllian Russell

James Samuel Risien Russell FRCP (17 September 1863 – 20 March 1939) was a Guyanese-British physician, neurologist, professor of medicine, and professor of medical jurisprudence.

== Early life ==
Russell was of mixed race, born in Demerara, British Guiana (now Guyana), to Hon. William Russell, a Scottish émigré water engineer and sugar plantation owner, and Hon. Mrs Russell, who was of African descent but about whom little is yet known. He was one of four sons with an older brother John and two younger brothers, William (Junior) and Alexander. His father was one of the richest men in the colony. Russell was sent to Scotland as a teenager to continue his education.

== Education and career ==
After education from 1880 to 1882 at the Dollar Institute in Scotland, J. S. Risien Russell studied medicine at the University of Edinburgh, graduating MB CM in 1886, and MD in 1893 with gold medal. He qualified MRCP in 1891. He went to London for postgraduate study at St Thomas's Hospital and won a British Medical Association (BMA) scholarship in 1895. After study in Paris and Berlin, he was appointed resident medical officer at the National Hospital, Queen Square. He held appointments there for thirty years, becoming assistant physician, then physician, and retiring as consultant physician and joining the National Hospital's board of management.

Early in his career he also held junior appointments at the Royal Brompton Hospital and Nottingham General Hospital and was appointed assistant physician to the Metropolitan Hospital. In the 1890s he collaborated with Victor Horsley on anatomical research. Russell was appointed to the visiting medical staff of University College Hospital, becoming full physician and professor of clinical medicine. There he was also appointed professor of medical jurisprudence in 1900. He also maintained a private practice at his house on Wimpole Street, Marylebone. He was elected a Fellow of the Royal College of Physicians (FRCP) in 1897.

In 1900, he wrote the pioneer description of subacute combined degeneration of the spinal cord with his junior colleagues, Batten and Collier. He also gave a complete account of Tay-Sachs disease.

He was the author or co-author of a number of research articles. He contributed articles on neurological disease to Quain's Dictionary of Medicine, Allbutt's A System of Medicine, the Encyclopaedia Medica, and Gibson's Textbook of Medicine.

Russell served as vice-president of the Section of Psychological Medicine and Neurology at the annual meeting of the BMA in London in 1910. He was elected a corresponding member of the Société de Neurologie de Paris.

From 1908 to 1918 he served as a captain in the RAMC. During WWI he was a leading expert on "shell shock" and "neurasthenia".

He clashed with psychiatrists for his belief that patients with psychosis should not be so readily committed to asylums when they might receive better care at home within their families, with support from general practitioners. He disapproved of the freedoms of the "modern girl", which made them "unfit for motherhood and the duties and responsibilities of married life".

== Personal life ==
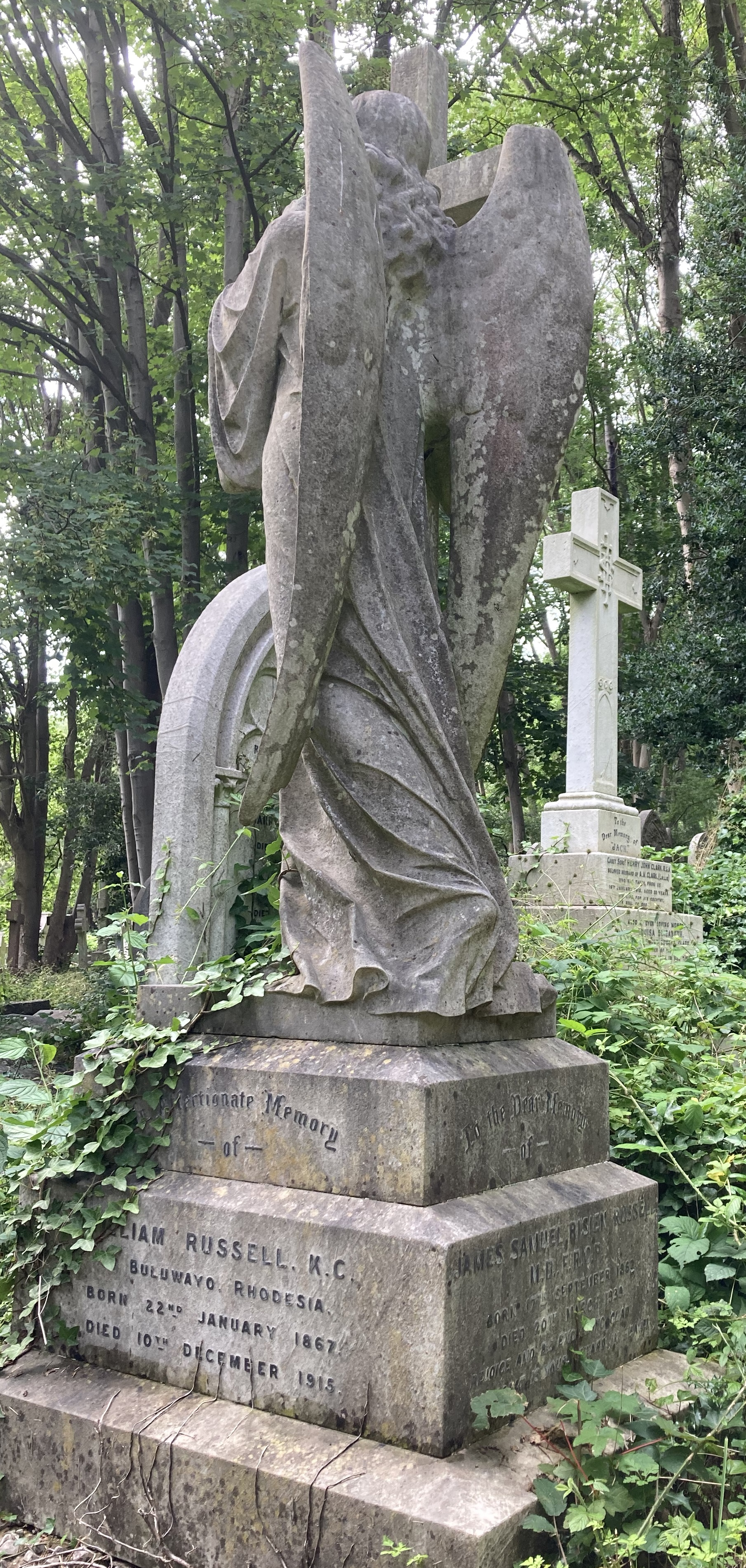
Family grave of James Samuel Risien Russell on the east side of Highgate Cemetery

On 28 July 1892 in Kenwyn, Cornwall, he married Ada Gwenllian Michell (1869–1922). Their daughter Marjory Gwenllian Russell was born in 1893. The couple were divorced following a report in The Times in December 1913 that he had spent the night with an unidentified woman at the Great Northern Hotel, King's Cross. The scandal led to his resignation from University College Hospital and his clubs, and led to a decrease in female patients in the following years.

In 1924 in Marylebone, London, Risien Russell married the widow Ada Clement (1882–1971), daughter of a Lancashire JP. Many of the patients in his private practice were from London's high society.

== Commemoration ==
English Heritage erected a blue plaque at 44 Wimpole Street, Marylebone, London in 2021, at the site where he lived and ran his private practice from 1902 until his death in 1939. He died in his consulting rooms, between appointments.

Research by the Windrush Foundation and medical historians has raised the profile of his life and pioneering medical work in recent years.

== Selected publications ==
- "V. The abductor and adductor fibres of the recurrent laryngeal nerve". Proceedings of the Royal Society of London. 51 (308–314): 102–112. 1892. doi:10.1098/rspl.1892.0015.
- "II. An experimental investigation of the nerve roots which enter into the formation of the brachial plexus of the dog". Philosophical Transactions of the Royal Society of London B. 184: 39–63. 1893. doi:10.1098/rstb.1893.0002.
- "XVIII. Experimental researches into the functions of the cerebellum". Philosophical Transactions of the Royal Society of London B. 185 (part 2): 819–861. 1894. doi:10.1098/rstb.1894.0018.
- Russell, J. S. Risien (13 August 1894). "An Experimental Investigation of Eye Movements". The Journal of Physiology. 17 (1–2): 1–26. doi:10.1113/jphysiol.1894.sp000516. PMC 1514574. PMID 16992201.
- "The origin and destination of certain afferent and efferent tracts in the medulla oblongata". Proceedings of the Royal Society of London. 61 (369–377): 73–76. 1897. doi:10.1098/rspl.1897.0014. S2CID 85393083.
- Russell, J. S. R. (23 October 1897). "An Experimental Investigation of the Cervical and Thoracic Nerve Roots in Relation to the Subject of Wry-Neck". Br Med J. 2 (1921): 1172–1173. doi:10.1136/bmj.2.1921.1172. PMC 2407836. PMID 20757361.
- with F. E. Batten and J. Collier: Russell, J. S. Risien; Batten, F. E.; Collier, James (1900). "Subacute combined degeneration of the spinal cord". Brain. 23: 39–110. doi:10.1093/brain/23.1.39. PMC 1990373.

== See also ==
- Black British elite, the class that Russell belonged to
