= Horace Stansfield Collier =

British Surgeon (1864–1930)

Horace Stansfield Collier FRCS LRCP
- Born: 15 July 1864; Littleborough, Lancashire
- Died: 26 February 1930 (aged 65); Teynham, Kent
- Occupation: Surgeon
- Spouse: Margaret Young
- Relatives: James Stansfield Collier (Brother)

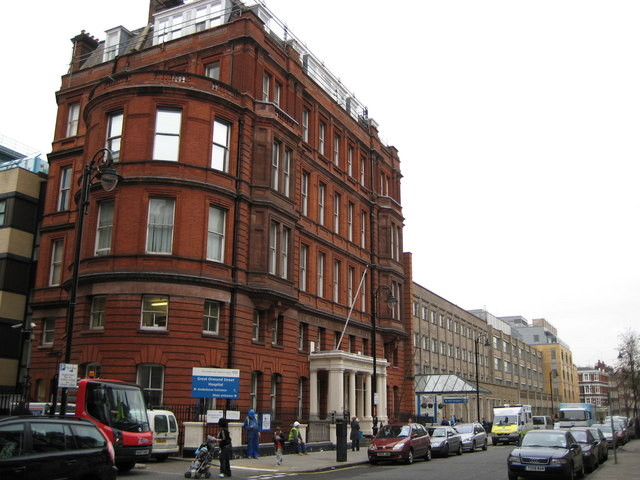
Great Ormond Street Hospital for Children

Horace Stansfield Collier FRCS LRCP (15 July 1864 – 26 February 1930) was a British surgeon at St Mary's Hospital, London, and the Great Ormond Street Hospital for Children (1897–1911). His brother was the physician and neurologist James Stansfield Collier.

== Early life ==
Collier was born in Littleborough, Lancashire, on 15 July 1864, the elder son of Alfred Henry Collier and his wife Sarah Collier (née Stansfield). Sarah was a descendant of the Stansfield family of Stansfield, Yorkshire. His younger brother was James Stansfield Collier (1870–1935).

== Career ==
Collier was a student at St Mary’s Hospital, London, before qualifying with a Licentiate of the Royal College of Physicians (LRCP) and being elected as a Member of the Royal College of Surgeons (MRCP) in 1888. He was elected a Fellow of the Royal College of Surgeons in 1890. He became a Demonstrator in Anatomy (1894–98), Surgical Tutor (1897–1902) then Surgeon and Lecturer on Surgery (1906–11) and later at St Mary’s Hospital, London.

Collier was also Surgeon at the Great Ormond Street Hospital for Sick Children from 1897 to 1911 undertaking a huge workload. He also served as an Examiner in Surgery for the Worshipful Society of Apothecaries, and Surgeon at the Hostel of St Luke, Lord Mayor Treloar’s Home, and the College for Crippled Children, Alton.

He retired from Hospital surgery due to ill health in 1911 but continued as a Lieutenant and Clinical Teacher in Surgery with the Royal Army Medical Corps and was a Captain-Surgeon at the Territorial General Hospital, London. Collier died at Teynham, Kent, on 26 February 1930.
