= Stansfield (disambiguation) =

Stansfield is a village and parish in the West Suffolk district of Suffolk, England.

Stansfield may also refer to:

== People ==
- Stansfield (surname)
- Stansfield Turner (1923–2018), American admiral
- Robert Timothy Stansfield Frankford (1939–2015), Canadian politician

== Places ==
=== United Kingdom ===
==== Lancashire ====
- Jean Stansfield Memorial Park, Poulton-le-Fylde, Lancashire, England; a public park
- Stansfield Tower, Blacko, Pendle, Lancashire, England; a tower

==== West Yorkshire ====
- Stansfield, West Yorkshire, England; an ancient township near Todmorden, West Yorkshire
- Stansfield Hall railway station, Todmorden, Yorkshire, England; a former railway station in Todmorden, West Yorkshire
- Stansfield's Varieties, Leeds, West Yorkshire, England; former name of the Leeds City Varieties music hall

==== Fictional ====
- Stansfield University, a fictional university located in New York in the crime drama TV Series Power Book II: Ghost

=== Other places ===
- Mount Stansfield, Enderby Land, Antarctica

== See also ==
- Stainfield, two villages in Lincolnshire, England
- Stansfeld, a surname
- Stanfield (disambiguation)
- Stans (disambiguation)
- Field (disambiguation)
