= James Stansfield Collier =

British physician and neurologist (1870–1935)

James Stansfield Collier FRCP
- Born: 1870
- Died: 9 February 1935 (aged 64–65); 30 Wimpole Street, Marylebone, London
- Occupations: Physician and neurologist
- Known for: Collier's sign (1927) synonym: Collier tucked lid sign; Collier tract; description of cerebral tonsillar herniation (1904)

James Stansfield Collier FRCP (1870 – 9 February 1935) was an English physician and neurologist. His brother was the surgeon Horace Stansfield Collier.

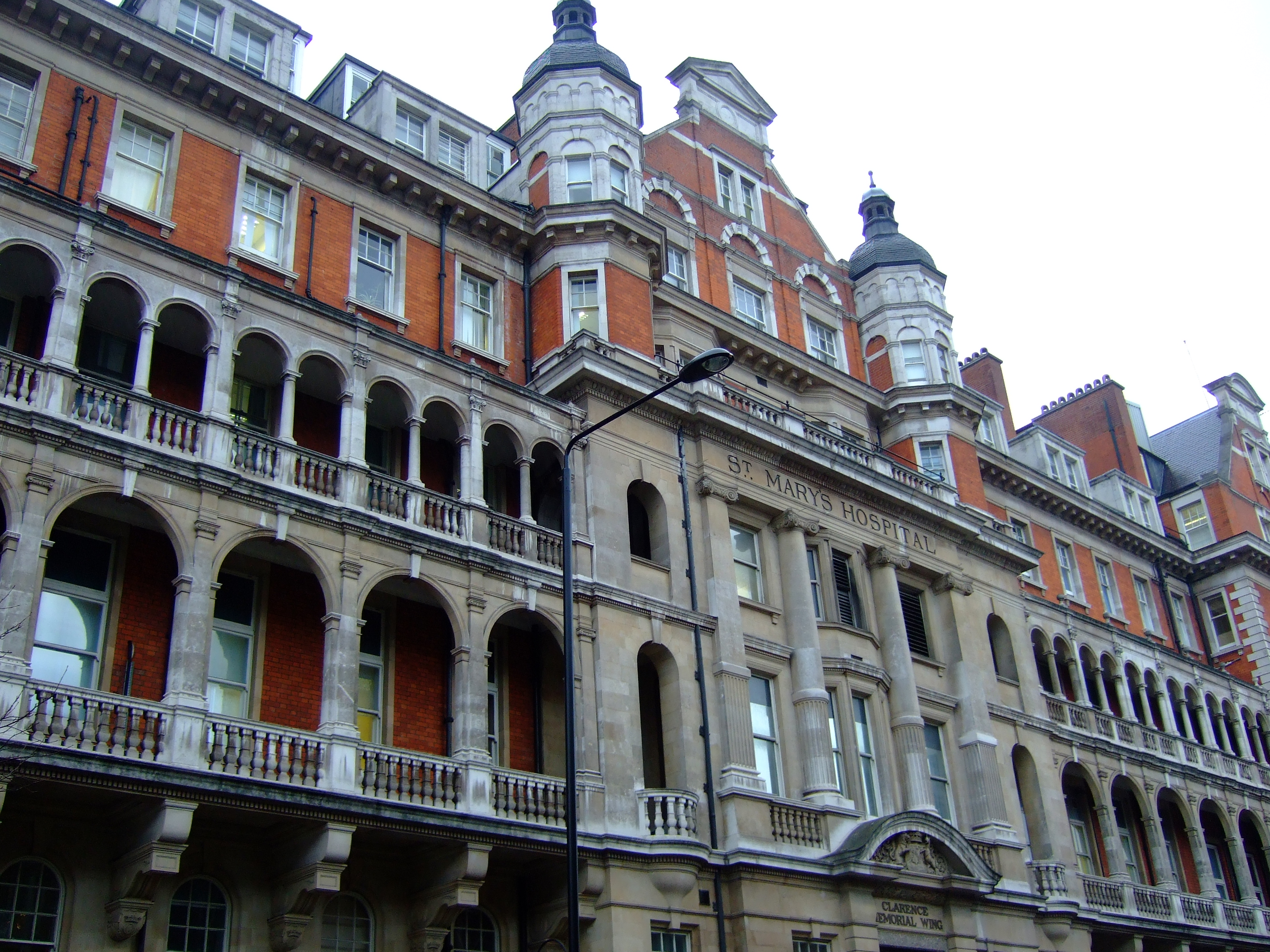
St Mary's Hospital, London.

== Early life ==
Collier was born in 1870, the second son of Alfred Henry Collier and his wife Sarah Collier (née Stansfield). Sarah was a descendant of the Stansfield family of Stansfield, Yorkshire. His elder brother was the surgeon Horace Stansfield Collier (1864–1930).

== Career ==
After education at the City and Guilds of London Institute, James Collier studied medicine at St Mary's Hospital Medical School, graduating BSc (Lond.) in 1890, MB in 1894, and MD in 1896 from the University of London. He held junior appointments at St Mary's Hospital and was a demonstrator of biology there. At London's National Hospital, Queen Square he was appointed house physician in 1898, registrar in 1899, pathologist in 1901, assistant physician in 1902, physician to out-patients in 1908, and physician in 1921. He also held appointments at St George's Hospital and lectured there on medicine and neurology. He lectured on neurology at Bethlem Royal Hospital and was consulting physician to the Royal Eye Hospital, Southwark.

He was a frequent contributor to Brain and wrote chapters in Allbutt and Rolleston's System of medicine. With his friend WJ Adie (1886–1935), he was responsible for the section on neurology in Price's textbook of medicine. ... His most esteemed work is his comprehensive analysis of Subacute combined degeneration of the spinal cord, ... written in 1900 in collaboration with JSR Russell and FE Batten.

... Collier was widely regarded as a neurologist of the first rank. He made many contributions to the subject ... such as those on ... Babinski's sign, the localizing signs of cerebral tumours, and Bell's paralysis.

The contemporary concept of the physiology of the Babinski response is similar to that described by Collier in 1899 ...

He worked with Hughlings Jackson on respiratory movements in chloroform anaesthesia, with Kinnier Wilson on myotonia congenita and on disorders that Gowers described as 'ataxia paraplegia'.

On 1 September 1906 at All Souls Church, Langham Place, Collier married Minna Maude Summerhayes. They had one son and two daughters. James Collier's elder brother was Horace Stansfield Collier, F.R.C.S.

== Honours ==
- 1903 — Fellow of the Royal College of Physicians
- 1923 — President of the Section of Neurology, Annual Meeting of the Royal Society of Medicine
- 1928 — Lumleian Lecturer
- 1930 — Savill Memorial Orator
- 1931–1932 — FitzPatrick Lecturer (lectures in 1931 and 1932 on the development of neurology from 1800 to 1930)
- 1932 — Morison Lecturer
- 1934 — Harveian Orator

== Selected publications ==
- Collier, James (1899). "An investigation upon the plantar reflex, with reference to the significance of its variations under pathological conditions, including enquiry into aetiology of acquired pes cavus". Brain. 22: 71–99. doi:10.1093/brain/22.1.71 – via HathiTrust.
- Russell, J. S. Risien; Batten, F. E.; —— (1900). "Subacute combined degeneration of the spinal cord". Brain. 23 (5156): 39–110. doi:10.1093/brain/23.1.39. PMC 1990373. PMID 13856913 – via HathiTrust.
- —— (23 April 1927). "An Address on An Address on The Epidemiology and Pathology of Poliomyelitis". Br Med J. 1 (3459): 751–753. doi:10.1136/bmj.1.3459.751. PMC 2454767. PMID 20773143.
- —— (17 August 1929). "The diagnosis of frontal tumours". Br Med J. 2 (3580): 289–291. doi:10.1136/bmj.2.3580.289. PMC 2451663. PMID 20774855.
- —— (March 1930). "Paralysis of the Oculomotor Nerve-trunks in Diabetes". Proc R Soc Med. 23 (5): 627–630. PMC 2181855. PMID 19987441.
