= Stans (disambiguation) =

Stans is a city in Switzerland. It may also refer to:

- Stans, Austria, a village
- Countries, mostly in South Asia and Central Asia, whose names end in the Persian suffix -stan
- Stans, the fanbase of rapper Eminem
  - Stans (film), a 2025 documentary about Eminem
