= Randell Stansfield =

Former American army officer (b.1950)

Colonel Randell Stansfield
- Born: 11 November 1950
- Education: Columbia College; Michigan State University; Webster University
- Occupation: Military Officer
- Military career
- Allegiance: United States
- Branch: US Army
- Service years: 1972–2003
- Rank: Colonel
- Unit: Adjutant General's Corp

Randell Stansfield (born November 11, 1950) is a former military officer of the United States.

== Life ==
His master's degree studies were at Michigan State and at Webster University, and his Bachelor of Science degree was from Columbia College. He is a graduate of the US Army War College and the US Air Force Command and Staff College. Stansfield is married to Kenra Maxfield and has six children.

Stansfield served at the Pope Air Force Base during the Green Ramp disaster in March 1994. It was the worst peacetime loss of life suffered by the 82nd Airborne Division since the end of World War II.

During the disaster, Stansfield was one of the officers on duty and first to respond. Though 24 soldiers died, experts say it would have been much worse had the response been slower. Because of this effort, only one soldier with children died before the division was able to retire him early. "Retiring people was a focused effort, day and night," said Stansfield.

He spent the last five years of his career as deputy chief of staff for personnel ("G1") and later assistant chief of staff for US Army Pacific in Fort Shafter in Honolulu, Hawaii. He led military and civilian human resources management, wellbeing and business operations for army forces throughout the Pacific. Prior to that he was a battalion commander in Korea and a branch chief in US Army Personnel Command in Washington, D.C. He served as the personnel officer and adjutant general for the 82d Airborne Division, and executive officer to the commanding general, US Army Special Operations Command at Fort Bragg, North Carolina. He holds two Humanitarian Service Medals and was involved in HA/DR operations for Hurricane Andrew, Hurricane Dora and the evacuation of forces from Teheran, Iran. Stansfield retired around 2003 as a colonel in the Adjutant General's Corp of the United States Army with over thirty-one years of service.

Since retiring, Stansfield was a consultant for military and civilian contracting, a management executive for a major property management firm in Honolulu, and a small business owner in Maui. Since 2006 he was the chief of human resources at Veterans Administration – Pacific Islands Health Care System.
