= William Stansfield (railway officer) =

British/Australian railway officer and soldier (1874–1946)

Colonel William Stansfield CMG, DSO, VD
- Born: 19 November 1874; Wadsworth, Yorkshire, England
- Died: 19 May 1946 (aged 71); Brisbane, Australia
- Occupations: Railway officer; Soldier
- Spouse: Amy Louisa Rogers
- Children: 5
- Military career
- Allegiance: Australia
- Branch: Citizen Military Forces; Australian Imperial Force
- Service years: 1900–1937; 1939–1941
- Rank: Colonel
- Conflicts: First World War; Second World War
- Awards: Companion of the Order of St Michael and St George; Distinguished Service Order; Colonial Auxiliary Forces Officers' Decoration; Mentioned in Despatches (3)

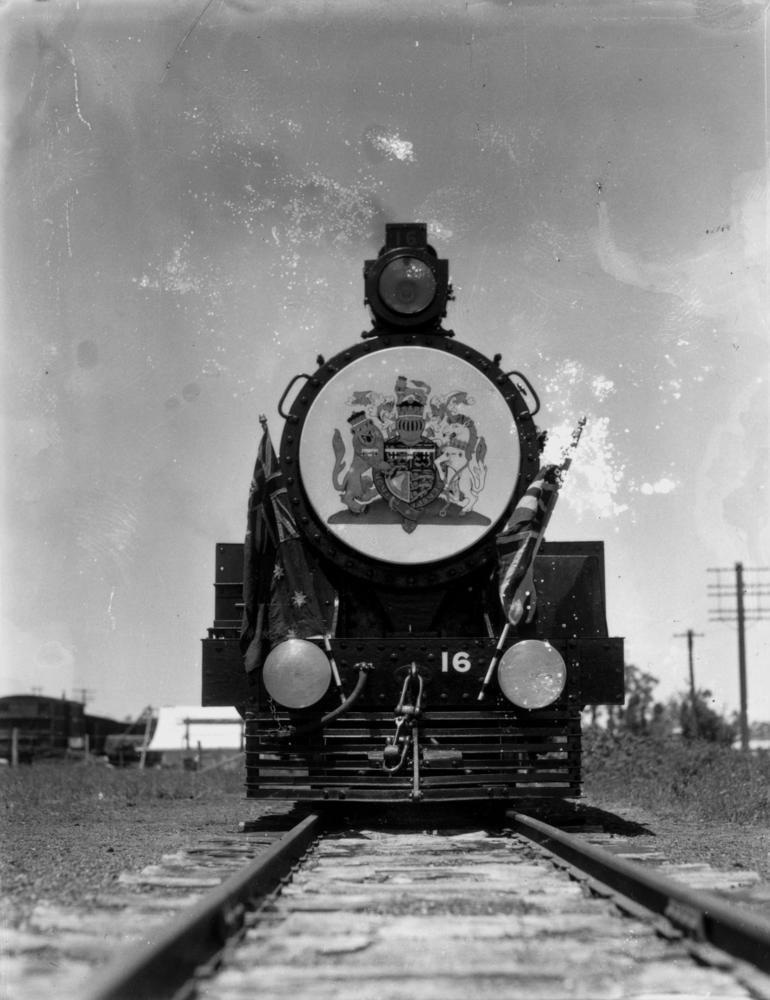
The Royal Train decorated with their Coat of Arms for the visit of The Duke and Duchess of York to Queensland, 1927

Colonel William Stansfield, CMG, DSO, VD (19 November 1874 – 19 May 1946) was a British-born Australian soldier and a railway officer in the Queensland State Railways. He served on Gallipoli and in the Middle East during the First World War.

== Early life ==
Stansfield was born in 1874 at Wadsworth, Todmorden, Yorkshire, the son of the bootmaker Mitchell Stansfield and Margaret Ann Stansfield (née Forrester). He was a descendant of the Stansfield family of Stansfield, Yorkshire. The family emigrated to Queensland in 1887. Stansfield was educated at Kelvin Grove State School, Brisbane, and worked for the Queensland State Railways from 1898 to 1914.

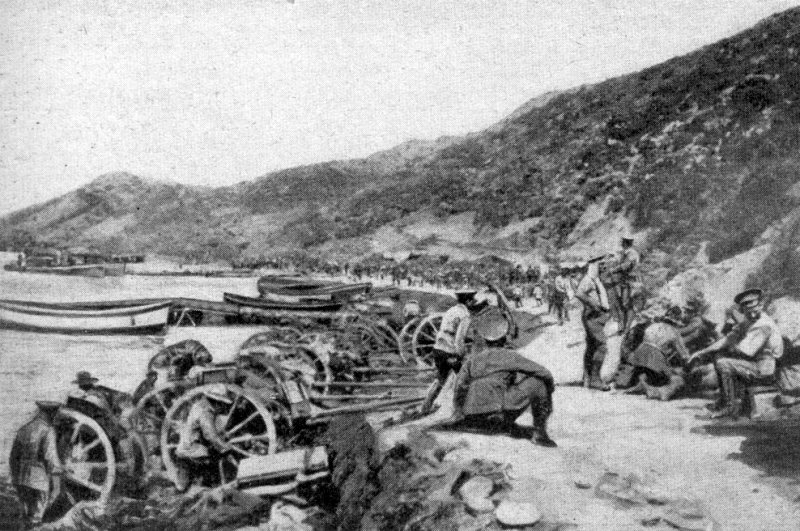
View of Anzac Cove, Gallipoli, shortly after the landing on 25 April 1915.

== Career ==
In 1900, Stansfield enlisted in the Moreton Regiment, transferring to the Australian Army Service Corps in 1905, becoming a second lieutenant in 1911. He enlisted in the Australian Imperial Force in 1914 and was appointed brigade supply officer of the 1st Light Horse Brigade. Landing at Gallipoli in May 1915, he commanded the beach supply depot of the New Zealand and Australian Division.

Stansfield was promoted to major in 1916, when Major General Harry Chauvel formed the ANZAC Mounted Division in Egypt, and was in charge of supplies during the operations of 1916–17, which defeated the Ottoman Turkish advance towards Suez. Stansfield rose to lieutenant colonel and Chauvel promoted him to be his Assistant Director of Supply and Transport for the Desert Mounted Corps from 1917. He was awarded the Distinguished Service Order in December 1917.

During 1918, Stansfield supplied the Desert Mounted Corps in the Jordan Valley and during the battle at Megiddo and the capture of Damascus and Aleppo. For his "continuous zeal and ability", Stansfield was appointed a Companion of the Order of St Michael and St George and was mentioned in despatches three times between 1917 and 1919.

Discharged in 1919, Stansfield returned to the Queensland State Railways. Sir Harry Chauvel visited Brisbane later that year, and approached the head of Queensland's railways and convinced him to promote Stansfield to Inspector of Passenger Rolling Stock from 1920. During the Royal Visits of The Prince of Wales, Prince Henry and The Duke and Duchess of York in 1927 and 1934, Stansfield was the State Transport Officer for Queensland.

Stansfield joined the 1st Division, Australian Military Forces, in 1921. He was promoted from brevet major to lieutenant colonel in 1922. He was awarded the Colonial Auxiliary Forces Officers' Decoration. He retired in 1937 as honorary colonel, but returned again as Assistant Director of Remounts, Northern Command, in 1939, and as Liaison Officer for Civil and Military Defence, before finally retiring in 1941. Stansfield died on 19 May 1946.

== Family ==
Stansfield married Amy Louisa Rogers in 1897 and they had five children.
