= Jack Stanfield =

Canadian ice hockey player (born 1942)

- Born: May 30, 1942 (age 83) Toronto, Ontario, Canada
- Height: 5 ft 11 in (180 cm)
- Weight: 175 lb (79 kg; 12 st 7 lb)
- Position: Left wing
- Shot: Left
- Played for: Chicago Black Hawks; Houston Aeros
- Playing career: 1967–1977

John Stanfield (born May 30, 1942) is a Canadian former professional ice hockey forward in both the World Hockey Association and the National Hockey League. He played one game in the National Hockey League for the Chicago Black Hawks during the 1966 Stanley Cup playoffs, on April 14, 1966 against the Detroit Red Wings. Later on, he played 112 games in the World Hockey Association with the Houston Aeros over two seasons between 1972 and 1974, where he served as a member of the Avco World Trophy champion in 1974. He closed his career with a season in the National League B in 1975.

== Personal life ==
Jack also played over a decade in the minor leagues. He is the older brother of the late Fred Stanfield and the late Jim Stanfield, both of whom also played professional hockey.

== Career statistics ==
=== Regular season and playoffs ===
			Regular season					Playoffs
Season	Team	League	GP	G	A	Pts	PIM	GP	G	A	Pts	PIM
1960–61	Dixie Beehives	MetJBHL	25	25	20	45	—	—	—	—	—	—
1961–62	St. Catharines Teepees	OHA	42	8	11	19	12	6	1	0	1	0
1962–63	Philadelphia Ramblers	EHL	68	33	34	67	38	3	0	0	0	4
1963–64	St. Louis Braves	CPHL	63	23	33	56	39	6	1	1	2	0
1964–65	Buffalo Bisons	AHL	72	19	20	39	34	9	2	5	7	4
1965–66	Buffalo Bisons	AHL	59	13	11	24	42	—	—	—	—	—
1965–66	Chicago Black Hawks	NHL	—	—	—	—	—	1	0	0	0	0
1966–67	Los Angeles Blades	WHL	47	12	10	22	29	—	—	—	—	—
1967–68	Dallas Black Hawks	CPHL	67	20	21	41	31	2	0	0	0	0
1968–69	San Diego Gulls	WHL	68	14	13	27	18	7	1	1	2	0
1969–70	Rochester Americans	AHL	66	21	21	42	19	—	—	—	—	—
1970–71	Rochester Americans	AHL	48	11	9	20	35	—	—	—	—	—
1971–72	Rochester Americans	AHL	62	11	16	27	74	—	—	—	—	—
1972–73	Houston Aeros	WHA	71	8	12	20	8	9	1	0	1	0
1973–74	Houston Aeros	WHA	41	1	3	4	2	7	0	0	0	2
1973–74	Macon Whoopees	SHL	3	6	1	7	4	—	—	—	—	—
1974–75	EHC Basel	NLB	4	2	3	5	6	—	—	—	—	—
WHA totals			112	9	15	24	10	16	1	0	1	2
NHL totals			—	—	—	—	—	1	0	0	0	0

== See also ==
- List of players who played only one game in the NHL
- List of family relations in the NHL
