= John Stansfeld =

British civil servant, doctor, Anglican priest and philanthropist (1854–1939)

The Reverend John Stedwell Stansfeld
- Born: 16 December 1855; Walworth, Surrey
- Died: 17 December 1939 (aged 84); Spelsbury, Oxfordshire
- Education: Exeter College, Oxford; Wycliffe Hall, Oxford
- Occupations: Physician; Anglican priest
- Spouse: Janet Marples (d.1918)

John Stedwell Stansfeld (English: /ˈstænsfiːld/; 16 December 1855 – 17 December 1939) was a doctor, Anglican priest and philanthropist in Oxford, England, who founded the Oxford Medical mission in Bermondsey, London, and the Stansfeld Oxford & Bermondsey Club Football Club in 1897.

== Early life ==
Stansfeld was born in West Street, Walworth, Surrey, in 1855, the son of Alfred Stansfeld (1823–86) and Eliza Stedwell (1819–1914). His father was a relative of the Stansfeld family of Stansfield and Field House, Sowerby, Yorkshire.

== Career ==
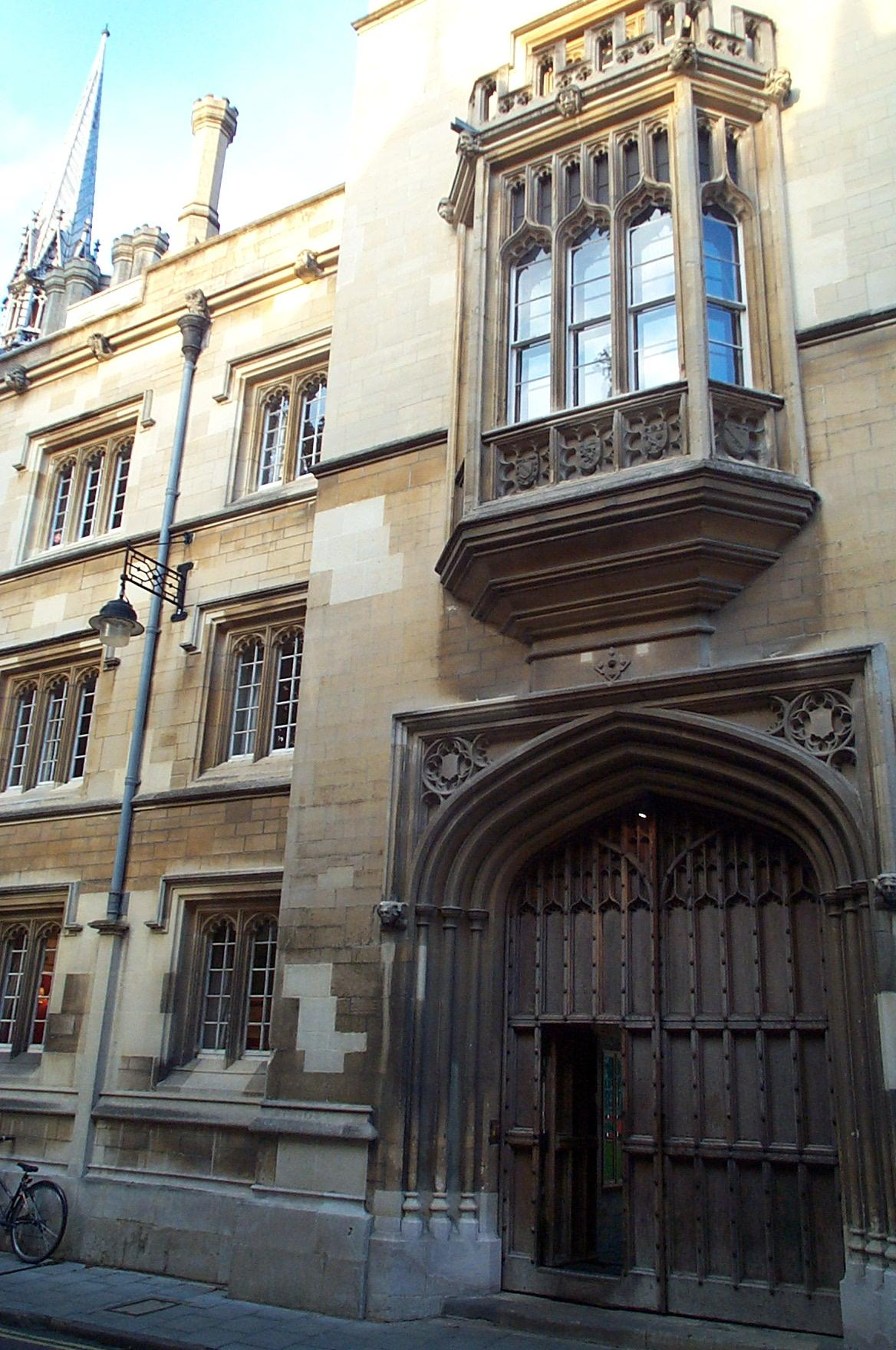
Exeter College, Oxford

Stansfeld began his career as a civil servant in HM Customs and Excise. In 1877, he moved to Oxford, and later matriculated as a student at Exeter College, where he studied medicine, attaining his BA in 1889, MA in 1893 and qualified as a doctor in 1897. In 1897 he started the Oxford Medical Misson in Bermondsey, London, where he founded the Stansfeld Oxford & Bermondsey Club in the same year. In 1909, he decided to take Holy Orders and studied part-time at Wycliffe Hall, Oxford. He was appointed Vicar of St Anne's Church, Thoburn Square, Bermondsey in 1910, and then returned to Oxford in 1912 as Rector of St Ebbe's, Oxford then a slum district until his retirement in 1926. Stansfeld died at Spelsbury, Oxfordshire, aged 85 in December 1939. He campaigned successfully for the erection of a children's playground and public baths in St Ebbe's. His philanthropy is commemorated by a blue plaque in Paradise Square, unveiled in June 2009. Stansfeld also donated land in Headington Quarry in Oxford which was named after him as Stansfeld Park.

== Family ==
Stansfeld married Janet Marples (1871–1918) on 16 June 1902 at All Souls Church, Langham Place, London, and they had two children.

== Bibliography ==
Baron, Barclay. The Doctor: the story of John Stansfeld of Oxford and Bermondsey (London: Arnold, 1952)
