= Alfred Stansfield =

British-Canadian Metallurgist (1871–1944)

Professor Alfred Stansfield FRSC ARSM
- Born: 1871; Bradford, Yorkshire
- Died: 5 February 1944 (aged 72–73); Montreal, Canada
- Occupation: Metallurgist
- Spouse: Ethel Ernestine Grubb
- Children: 1

Academic background
- Education: Royal College of Science; Royal School of Mines

Alfred Stansfield FRSC ARSM (1871 – 5 February 1944) was a British-Canadian metallurgist and Birks Professor of Metallurgy at McGill University, Montreal, Canada (1901–36).

== Early life ==
Stansfield was born in Bradford, Yorkshire in 1872, the second son of Frederic and Mary Ellen Stansfield. His younger brother was the British physicist Herbert Stansfield (1872–1960). He was educated at the Royal College of Science, London and Royal College of Mines, London, graduating in 1891.

He was a Research Assistant in Sir William Roberts-Austen's laboratories at the Royal Mint between 1891 and 1898 and obtained his Bachelor of Science (BSc) and Doctor of Science (DSc) degrees at the University of London. He supervised the Metallurgical Laboratories at the Royal School of Mines from 1898 to 1901.

== Career ==
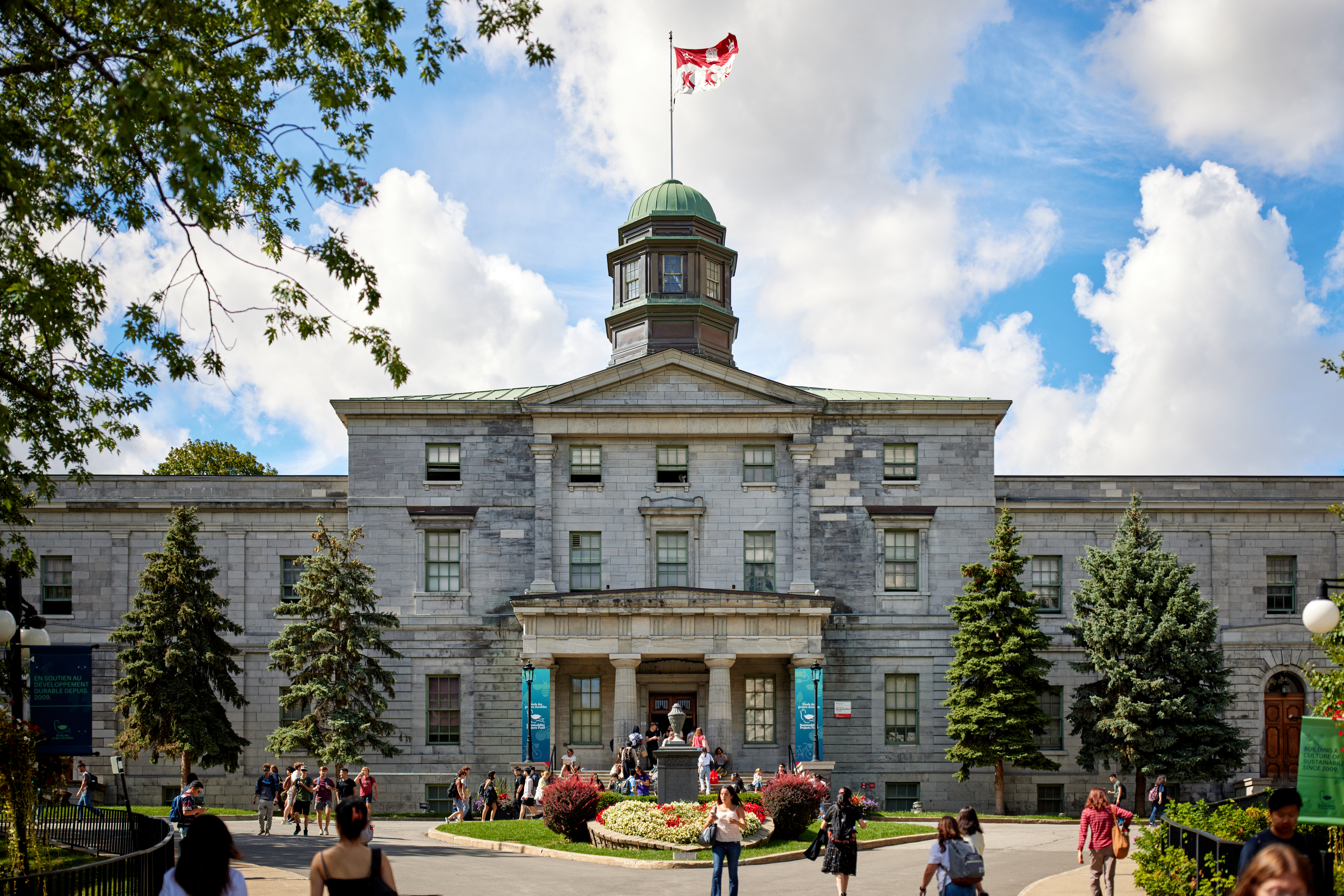
McGill University, Montreal

Stansfield was appointed Professor of Metallurgy at McGill University, Montreal in 1901, and later became Birks Professor of Metallurgy and Head of Department of Metallurgy in 1912. He also served as a Commissioner of the Pyx of the Royal Canadian Mint at Ottawa from 1911 to 1931.

His research focussed on pyrometry, the Solution Theory of Carburized Iron, the constitution of alloys, the burning of steel, smelting titaniferous ores of iron, electric smelting, graphical methods of teaching Thermochemistry and the investigation of metallurgical reactions at high temperatures. Consequently, he authored several reports for the Canadian government. He reported on the electric smelting of iron ores in Sweden in 1914, on Canadian magnesium production in 1915, and on the electric smelting of iron ores in British Columbia in 1918. In 1915, he was a Member of a Commission appointed by the Canadian Minister of Defence to investigate the feasibility of producing refined copper and zinc. Stansfield retired in 1936. He died in Montreal, Canada, on 5 February 1944.

== Honours ==
Stansfield was an Associate of the Royal School of Mines (ARSM) and was awarded the Plummer Medal by the Engineering Institute of Canada in 1921. He served as Vice-President of the American Electrochemical Society from 1928 and was elected a Fellow of the Royal Society of Canada (FRSC).

== Family ==
Stansfield married, in 1905, Ethel Ernestine Grubb (1877–1942), the daughter of F. E. Grubb of Cahir Abbey, County Tipperary, and Berkeley, California. They had one daughter. Ethel's sister, Edith Grubb, married Alfred's brother Herbert Stansfield.

== Select Publications ==
- Stansfeld, A. (1907). The Electric Furnace, its Evolution, Theory and Practice. New York: Hill Pub. Co.
- Stansfeld, A. (1914). The Electric Furnace, its Construction, Operation, and Uses. New York: McGraw-Hill Book Company, Inc.
- Stansfeld, A. (1915). Electrothermic Smelting of Iron Ores in Sweden. Ottawa: Government Bureau.
- Stansfeld, A. (1916). Electric Furnaces as applied to Non-Ferrous Metallurgy. Montreal.
- Stansfeld, A. (1919). The Commercial Feasibility of the Electric Smelting of Iron Ores in B.C. Victoria, B.C.: W.H. Cullin.
- Stansfeld, A. (1923). The Electric Furnace for Iron and Steel. New York: McGraw-Hill Book Co.
