= Bert Stansfield =

British football player and manager (1874–1938)

James Burton Stansfield
Personal information
- Date of birth: 1874
- Place of birth: Littleborough, Lancashire
- Date of death: 1938 (aged 63–64)
- Place of death: Newcastle upon Tyne

Managerial career
- Years: Team
- 1908–1910: Carlisle United
- 1910–1915: Norwich City
- 1926: Norwich City

James Burton "Bert" Stansfield (1874 – 1938) was a British footballer and Football Manager who managed the English football clubs Carlisle United (1908–10) and Norwich City (1910–15 and 1926).

== Early life ==
Stansfield was born near Littleborough, Lancashire, in 1874. He was the eldest son of Abraham Stansfield (b.1853) and Mary Ann Stansfield née Riley (b.1859). Abraham was a descendant of the Stansfield family of Stansfield, Yorkshire. His siblings were Amelia Stansfield (b.1872) and Ernest Stansfield (b.1876). His father, Abraham Stansfield, was born in Walsden, and his mother was born in Stacksteads. In the 1881 Census (taken on 3 April 1881), the family were living with Mary Ann’s mother, Jane Riley (b.1825), in Old Tunstead Road, Newchurch. By the 1891 Census (taken on 5 April 1891), Mary Ann was deceased, and her widower and children were living in Brandwood Road, Spotland. James, aged 16, was employed as a cotton weaver.

== Career ==
Stansfield was Carlisle United's fourth manager between 1908 and 1910. He was Norwich City's fourth manager and was in charge for 248 matches, between 1910 and 1915, later returning to the job for a short spell in 1926. His sides won 78, lost 95 and drew 75 games.

== Family ==
Stansfield married Clara Barcroft (1874–1923) at Haslingden in 1895. They lived in Bacup (until 1908) and had three children: Lily Stansfield (b.1898), Amy Eunice Stansfield (b.1901) and Henry Stansfield (b.1908). In the 1911 Census (2 April 1911), the family lived in Norwich, Norfolk. He married for the second time to Mildred Ellen Empson (1886–1968) in Mutford, Suffolk, in 1926. Stansfield died in Newcastle upon Tyne in 1938.
