= Arthur Stansfield Peebles =

British army officer (1872–1933)

Lieutenant-Colonel Arthur Stansfield Peebles DSO
- Born: 16 November 1872; Cheltenham, Gloucestershire
- Died: 29 June 1933 (aged 60)
- Education: Cheltenham College
- Occupation: Army officer
- Spouse: Iris Mary Evelyn Woolley
- Children: 2
- Military career
- Allegiance: United Kingdom
- Branch: British Army
- Service years: 1894–1923
- Rank: Lieutenant (1897); Captain (1901); Major (1912); Lieutenant-Colonel (1915)
- Unit: Suffolk Regiment

Arthur Stansfield Peebles DSO (16 November 1872 – 29 June 1933) was a British army officer who served during the Boer War in South Africa (1899–1901) and World War I (1914–17).

== Career ==
Peebles, born on 16 November 1872, was the second surviving son of Colonel Thomas Peebles of the 11th Foot. He was educated at Cheltenham College before enlisting in the Suffolk Regiment in 1894. He became a lieutenant in 1897 and served during the occupation of Crete (1898–99).

During the Boer War in South Africa (1899–1901) he was employed with Mounted Infantry, participating in operations in the Orange Free State, in the Transvaal and at Venterskroon, in Orange River Colony and at Ladybrand in 1900. He was severely wounded in an operation at Bothavile, but continued with operations in Cape Colony and at Colesberg, and in Orange River Colony (1900–1901). He was mentioned in dispatches, received the Queen's Medal with four clasps, was appointed a Companion of the Distinguished Service Order, and was promoted to Captain (1901).

Peebles married Iris Mary Evelyn Woolley in 1905, and they had two children. He served as a Recruiting Staff Officer in London (1905–09) and rose to the rank of major in 1912. He later served during World War I, was mentioned in dispatches and was promoted to lieutenant-colonel in 1915. Peebles retired in 1923 and later died, aged 60, on 29 June 1933.
