= Herbert Stansfield =

British physicist (1872-1960)

Professor Herbert Stansfield AMIEE
- Born: 1872; Bradford, Yorkshire
- Died: 14 March 1960 (aged 87–88); Southampton, Hampshire
- Occupation: Physicist
- Spouse: Edith Grubb
- Children: 1

Academic background
- Education: Ackworth School
- Alma mater: Bradford Technical College; Royal College of Science

Herbert Stansfield AMIEE (1872 – 14 March 1960) was a British physicist and Professor at University College, Southampton (1912–32) whose research focussed on soap films, the Michelson Interferometer and the Echelon Spectroscope.

== Early life ==
Stansfield was born in Bradford, Yorkshire in 1872, the second son of Frederic and Mary Ellen Stansfield. His elder brother was the British-Canadian metallurgist Alfred Stansfield (1871–1944). He was educated at Ackworth School, Bradford Technical College and the Royal College of Science, London.

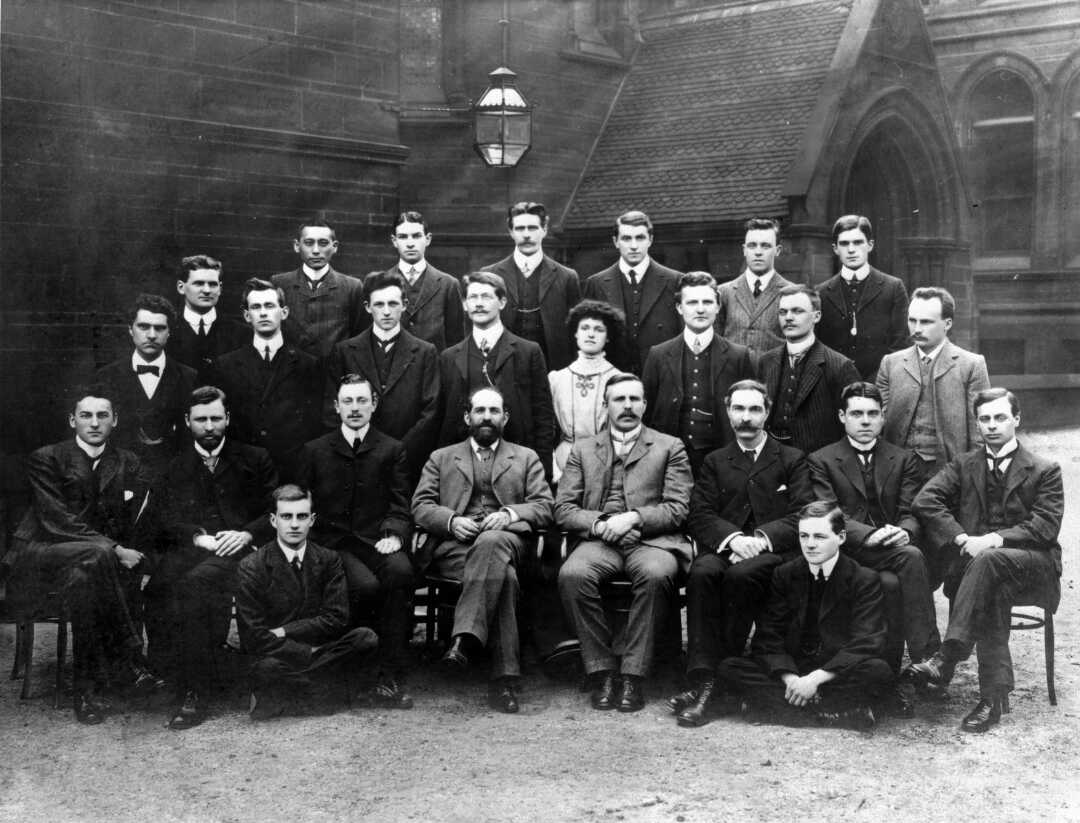
Stansfield in 1910 (seated, second from left).

== Career ==
Stansfield began his career as a Demonstrator in the Physical Laboratory at the Royal College of Science, then Evening Lecturer in Physics at the East London College, and later Lecturer in Physics and Electrical Engineering at Chelsea Polytechnic. He became Head of the Physics and Electrical Engineering Department at the Municipal Technical School, Blackburn in 1898, and then was an Honorary Research Fellow and later Lecturer in Physics at the Victoria University of Manchester from 1904 until 1912. He was elected to membership of the Manchester Literary and Philosophical Society on 1 November 1904

Stansfield was appointed Professor of Physics and Electrical Engineering at University College, Southampton, in 1912.

His publications included papers in scientific journals on soap films, dynamos, the Michelson Interferometer, the Echelon Spectroscope, and one on the " Sensitiveness of the Human Skin as a Detector of Alternating Electric Fields". Stansfield died in Southampton, Hampshire, on 14 March 1960.

== Honours ==
Stansfield was elected an Associate Member of the Institution of Electrical Engineers and was awarded the honorary degree of Doctor of Science (DSc) by the University of London in 1922.

== Family ==
Stansfield married, in 1908, Edith Grubb the daughter of F. E. Grubb of Cahir Abbey, County Tipperary, and Berkeley, California. They had one son, Ronald G. Stansfield. Edith's sister, Ethel Ernestine Grubb (1877–1942), married Herbert's brother Alfred Stansfield.
