= Timothy Stansfeld Engleheart =

British engraver (1803–1879)

Timothy Stansfeld Engleheart (/ˈstænsfiːld/ STANSS-feeld; 1803–1879) was an English engraver.

He engraved some of the plates in the British Museum marbles, but seems to have removed to Darmstadt, as there is a fine engraving by him of Ecce Homo, after Guido Reni, executed at Darmstadt in 1840.
