= Jim Stanfield =

Canadian ice hockey player (1947–2009)

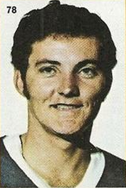
- Stanfield in 1971 stamp
- Born: January 1, 1947 Dixie, Ontario, Canada
- Died: November 19, 2009 (aged 62)
- Height: 5 ft 10 in (178 cm)
- Weight: 160 lb (73 kg; 11 st 6 lb)
- Position: Centre/Right wing
- Shot: Left
- Played for: Los Angeles Kings
- Playing career: 1967–1977

James Bovaird Stanfield (January 1, 1947 – November 19, 2009) was a Canadian professional ice hockey player. He played in 7 NHL games for the Los Angeles Kings in parts of three seasons between 1970 and 1971. The rest of career, which lasted from 1967 to 1977, was spent in the minor leagues.

Born in Dixie, Ontario, Stanfield was the younger brother of NHL forwards Jack Stanfield and Fred Stanfield. In the 1975–76 season, both Fred and Jim played in the same home city (Buffalo, New York) but for different teams: Fred with the NHL's Sabres and Jim with the NAHL's Norsemen.

== Career statistics ==
=== Regular season and playoffs ===
			Regular season					Playoffs
Season	Team	League	GP	G	A	Pts	PIM	GP	G	A	Pts	PIM
1964–65	St. Catharines Black Hawks	OHA	3	0	1	1	0	—	—	—	—	—
1965–66	St. Catharines Black Hawks	OHA	45	7	10	17	42	2	0	0	0	4
1966–67	London Nationals	WOHL	45	32	19	51	53	6	6	2	8	0
1967–68	Dallas Black Hawks	CHL	24	5	5	10	6	—	—	—	—	—
1968–69	Dallas Black Hawks	CHL	66	24	15	39	16	11	5	3	8	2
1969–70	Los Angeles Kings	NHL	1	0	0	0	0	—	—	—	—	—
1969–70	Dallas Black Hawks	CHL	55	18	11	29	8	—	—	—	—	—
1969–70	Springfield Kings	AHL	18	11	5	16	2	14	8	9	17	2
1970–71	Los Angeles Kings	NHL	2	0	0	0	0	—	—	—	—	—
1970–71	Springfield Kings	AHL	45	7	19	26	22	11	1	0	1	6
1971–72	Los Angeles Kings	NHL	4	0	1	1	0	—	—	—	—	—
1971–72	Springfield Kings	AHL	64	30	26	56	11	3	0	0	0	0
1972–73	San Diego Gulls	WHL	21	9	14	23	4	—	—	—	—	—
1972–73	Portland Buckaroos	WHL	47	15	8	23	7	—	—	—	—	—
1973–74	San Diego Gulls	WHL	32	4	14	18	2	—	—	—	—	—
1973–74	Denver Spurs	WHL	35	15	21	36	4	—	—	—	—	—
1974–75	Spokane Flyers	WIHL	47	45	57	102	6	—	—	—	—	—
1975–76	Spokane Jets	WIHL	33	33	21	54	2	—	—	—	—	—
1975–76	Buffalo Norsemen	NAHL	27	10	19	29	0	4	1	1	2	0
1976–77	Spokane Jets	WIHL	56	10	16	26	4	—	—	—	—	—
AHL totals			127	48	50	98	35	28	9	9	18	8
WIHL totals			136	88	94	182	12	—	—	—	—	—
NHL totals			7	0	1	1	0	—	—	—	—	—
