= Stanfield, Norfolk =

Civil parish in Norfolk, England

Coordinates: 52.74999°N 0.87259°E

Stanfield
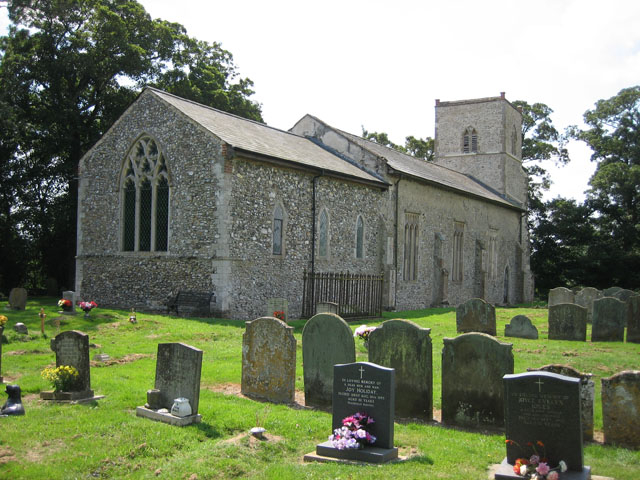
- St Margaret's, Stanfield

- Location within Norfolk
- Area: 3.80 km^{2} (1.47 sq mi)
- Population: 162
  - Density: 43/km^{2} (110/sq mi)
- OS grid reference: TF939207
- Civil parish: Stanfield
- District: Breckland
- Shire county: Norfolk
- Region: East
- Country: England
- Sovereign state: United Kingdom
- Post town: DEREHAM
- Postcode district: NR20
- Dialling code: 01328
- Police: Norfolk
- Fire: Norfolk
- Ambulance: East of England

Stanfield (English: /ˈstænfiːld/) is a civil parish in the English county of Norfolk. It covers an area of 3.80 km^{2} (1.47 sq mi) and had a population of 162 in 2011, and 144 at the 2001 census. For the purposes of local government, it falls within the district of Breckland. Stanfield belongs to the Parliamentary Constituency of Mid-Norfolk and is currently governed by George Freeman as their member of Parliament who is representative of the Conservative Party.

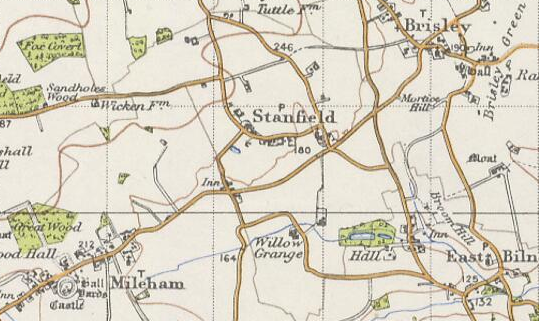
A map showing the area of Stanfield

== History ==
The name Stanfield translates to 'stony open land'. It derived from the Anglo-Saxon word 'stan' meaning stone or rock and 'feld' which means 'open country' or 'unencumbered ground'. In northern nations, stones were placed to serve as boundary marks. It was also placed on memorials to be able to distinguish those who had fought in battle, which then became practised by Odin as an act of sacred duty. The word 'stein' is a personal name in the Domesday Book, in which this village used to be recognised as Stanfelda.

In the years 1870 to 1872, John Marius Wilson described Stanfield as: "a parish in Mitford District, Norfolk; 3 and a half miles W by S Elham R. station."

=== The church of St. Margaret ===
Stanfield's local parish is St. Margaret's, it is a Grade I listed parish. It is situated 8 km south of Fakenham and falls within the Brackland Local Government District. The area surrounding the parish is mostly agricultural, as well as the parish acquiring an area of 378 hectares and accommodates the small village Stanfield. According to William White's historical writing of Stanfield, the church is "a neat building, consisting of a nave, chancel, south porch and square tower with four bells." This may indicate that this type of flint building dates back to the late Saxon or early Norman period. Furthermore, the parish was not exempt from alterations as in 1864, perpendicular style square windows in the nave and also the east window were added to preserve its early English style.

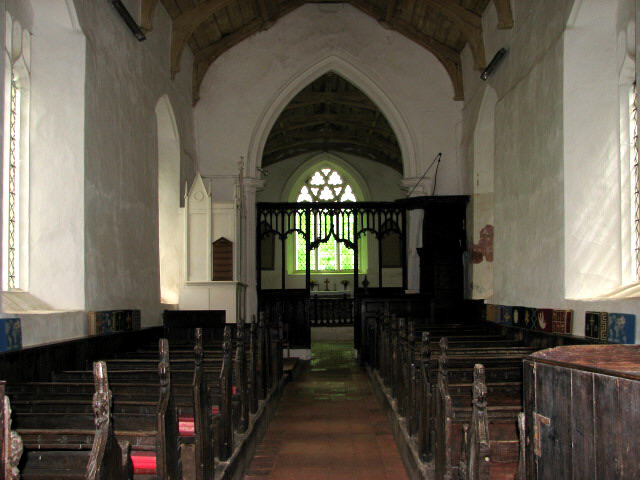
Inside St. Margaret's Parish

== Demography ==
=== Population and age structure ===
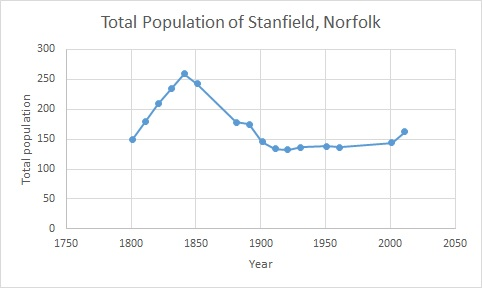
The graph shows the population density of Stanfield from 1801 to 2011

The total population graph illustrates that in 1801, its population consisted of 149 inhabitants. Since then it had dramatically increased in 1841, whereby it had a total population of 259. However, there is not much literature regarding why there was a dramatic increase of population in 1841. Furthermore, since then its population have been decreasing and have stayed stagnant from 1911, up until the early 2000s, whereby its population shows that it has significantly increased again. In relation to the 2001 Census Report, Stanfield's population was 144. However, in comparison to the 2011 Census, it is evident that it has increased to a total population of 162. In regards to Stanfield's age structure, 26.7% of Stanfield's total population is aged between 45 and 59 years old according to the 2001 Census Report. The mean average age of Stanfield can be estimated as 42.4 years old based on the 2001 Census Report. In comparison to the 2011 Census Report the mean average of the population of Stanfield is 39.1 years old.

=== Occupation structure ===
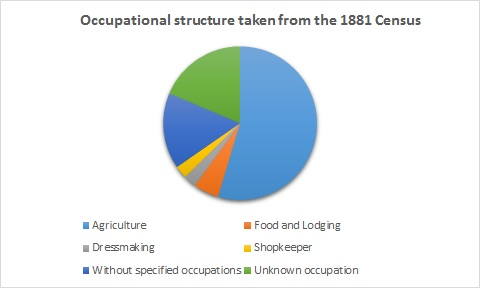
Pie chart representing what employment the demography of Stanfield belonged to.

The occupation structure from the 1881 census illustrates that majority of the population work within the agriculture industry as farmers. This is evident as, in relation to the map that represents the area of Stanfield, it shows that most of the area is greenspace. However, the pie chart shows that there are still a considerable number of people without a specified or known occupation. On the other hand, a minority of the population works as a shopkeeper or in food and lodging. In relation to White's historical writing published in 1864, he acknowledges a variety of employment. This includes a blacksmith, carpenter, shoemaker and victuallers. Despite the variety of employment, it appears that a majority of the population of Stanfield rely heavily on agriculture as means of employment during the 1800s. Furthermore, in the 1831 census of Stanfield, it is evident that agriculture is still the predominant employment. The number of families employed within the aforementioned industry were approximately 44. Whilst, a total number of families employed within trade, manufactures and handicraft were only a total of 4.

The occupation structure of Stanfield have increasingly changed since the 1800s. It has moved from a primary sector industry such as agricultural farming to a secondary and tertiary sector employment such as manufacturing, skilled trades and thus, providing services. In relation to the 2001 Census Report, 53 people are registered in employment within Stanfield, 14 of whom are employed in skilled trades occupations such as metal and electrical trades and printing and other skilled trades. Seven people of the aforementioned occupation group are still employed as skilled agricultural trades and related production. The 2001 Census Report also illustrated that 9 people were employed as administrative occupations as well as, secretarial and related occupations. In regards to the 2011 Census Report, there were no mention of occupations within the agriculture sector, most of the employment recorded are from the secondary and tertiary sector. In 2011, there has been an increase by 10 more people since 2001 in the number of people that work within the skilled trades industry. In addition, another category of employment have been added since the last Census Report in 2001. This category of employment is people working in caring, leisure and other service occupations. It has 7 people employed within the aforementioned industry and is on par with the number of people employed in sales and customer service. This suggests that some of Stanfield's total population may be retirees as the people working within the caring and leisure industry specialise in the care of children and the elderly.

== Transportation ==
The road B1145 runs through the town of Stanfield. It is served by the 13C bus routes along Stanfield Road. The village can also be accessible via cars as the A1065 is situated near Stanfield. In relation to the 2001 Census Report 57 households that is registered with or without ownership of cars and vans. In addition, majority of households have stated that they are in ownership of at least 1 or more cars or vans. At least 5 households have also stated that they have no possession of cars or vans.
