= James Stansfield (footballer) =

English footballer (born 1978)

Personal information
- Date of birth: 18 September 1978 (age 48)
- Place of birth: Dewsbury, England
- Position: Defender

Senior career*
Years	Team	Apps	(Gls)
1996–1998	Huddersfield Town	0	(0)
1998–2000	Halifax Town	26	(1)
2000–2001	Ossett Town		
2000–2001	→ Liversedge (loan)		
2001–2004	Bradford Park Avenue		
2004–2005	Guiseley		
2005	Liversedge		
2005–2006	Frickley Athletic		
2010	Ossett Albion		
2010–2011	Wakefield		
2011	Harrogate Railway Athletic		
2011–2012	Mossley		
- * Club domestic league appearances and goals

James Edward Stansfield (born 18 September 1978) is an English former professional footballer who played in the Football League for Halifax Town. He began his career with Huddersfield Town but never played for the first team. After leaving Halifax he played non-league football for clubs including Ossett Town, Liversedge, Bradford Park Avenue, Guiseley, Liversedge again, and Frickley Athletic.

His great-grandfather Jack Stansfield was also a footballer; both played for Bradford (Park Avenue).
