= Fred Stanfield =

Canadian ice hockey player (1944–2021)

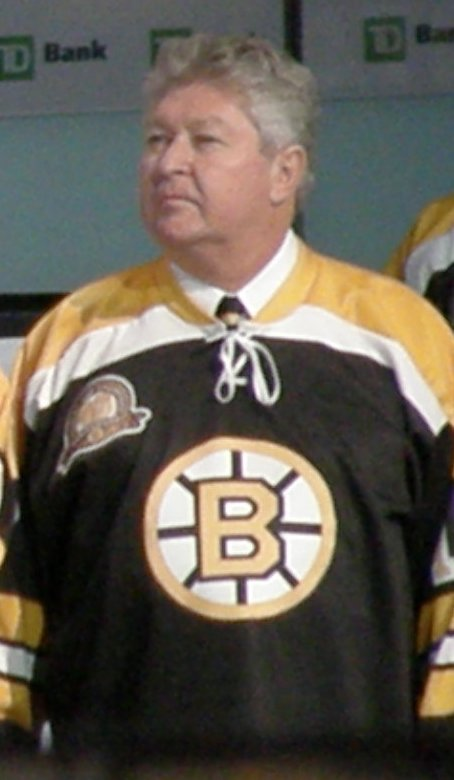
- Stanfield in 2010
- Born: May 4, 1944 Toronto, Ontario, Canada
- Died: September 13, 2021 (aged 77) Buffalo, New York, U.S.
- Height: 6 ft 0 in (183 cm)
- Weight: 177 lb (80 kg; 12 st 9 lb)
- Position: Centre, winger
- Shot: Left
- Played for: Chicago Black Hawks; Boston Bruins; Minnesota North Stars; Buffalo Sabres
- Playing career: 1964–1979

Frederic William Stanfield (May 4, 1944 – September 13, 2021) was a Canadian professional ice hockey centre who played 14 seasons in the National Hockey League from 1964 until 1978. He won two Stanley Cups with the Boston Bruins, in 1970 and 1972. He was known as a clean player, as only once did he receive more than 14 penalty minutes in any season of his professional career.

== Early life ==
Stanfield was born in Toronto on May 4, 1944. He had six brothers, most of whom would eventually become professional hockey players. As was the practice at the time, Stanfield was signed by the Chicago Black Hawks at age 16 (as were his brothers Jim and Jack), and assigned to the junior league St. Catharines Teepees (later St. Catharines Black Hawks), their Ontario Hockey Association affiliate.

Playing with many future NHL teammates and stars—the team's roster included Phil Esposito, Ken Hodge, Roger Crozier, Chico Maki, Dennis Hull and Poul Popiel—Stanfield played three seasons for St. Catharines. The final two seasons he led the team in scoring, and his final season, 1964, he was third in the league in scoring with 109 points, as well as being awarded the Max Kaminsky Trophy as the league's most sportsmanlike player.

== Playing career ==
=== Chicago Black Hawks ===
Called up for the 1964–65 season to the big league squad, Stanfield played the full season with Chicago, and then the next two seasons split his time between the Black Hawks and Chicago's St. Louis minor league affiliate.

In May 1967, Stanfield was traded, along with Phil Esposito and Ken Hodge, to the Boston Bruins, for defenceman Gilles Marotte, centre Pit Martin, and minor league goaltender Jack Norris.

=== Boston Bruins ===
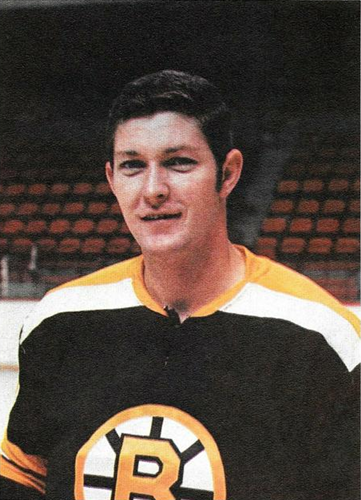
1970 photo of Stanfield for Boston Bruins

The trade came to be widely regarded as one of the most one-sided deals in hockey history, as Boston immediately became a powerhouse, moving from a last place team to a perennial power. While Esposito became a preeminent star in Boston and Hodge became a league All-Star, Stanfield centered the team's second line, with wingers John Bucyk and Johnny McKenzie—which some considered the best second line in hockey—as well as playing the left point on the Bruins' feared top power play unit, helping the team to lead the league in power play goals every year between 1969 and 1972. He scored 20 or more goals in every one of the six years he played for Boston, with the Bruins leading the league in goals in each of those seasons. He became noted for a heavy slap shot, making his mark in the first game of the 1970 Stanley Cup Final against the St. Louis Blues when he fired a shot so hard it split Blues goaltender Jacques Plante's mask in half, giving Plante a concussion which sidelined him for the remainder of the playoffs.

Stanfield's best years were between the 1971 and 1973 seasons. In 1971, he scored 76 points to finish 9th in league scoring. He also received the team's 7th Player Award, voted by the fans for the player performing most beyond expectations.

In the 1972 season, he scored 23 goals and 56 assists for 79 points, finishing 4th in the league in assists and 12th in the league in points, and added 7 goals and 9 assists for 16 points in 15 playoff games to help the Bruins to the Stanley Cup championship. He was a leading candidate for the Lady Byng Memorial Trophy for the league's most sportsmanlike player, finishing behind eventual winner Jean Ratelle of the New York Rangers and teammate Johnny Bucyk.

Stanfield followed up in the next season, when he scored 20 goals and 58 assists for 78 points, and was named to play in the 1973 All-Star Game as an injury replacement. Stanfield finished the season 7th in the league in assists.

=== Minnesota North Stars ===
Greatly depleted in goaltending by the losses of Gerry Cheevers to the World Hockey Association and Dan Bouchard to the Atlanta Flames in the 1972 NHL Expansion Draft, Boston's goaltending was down to 36-year-old career minor leaguer Ross Brooks and 44-year-old late season acquisition Jacques Plante. Determined to bolster that position, new Boston general manager Harry Sinden traded Stanfield to the Minnesota North Stars for goaltender Gilles Gilbert. Shifted to the right wing for the centre-rich North Stars, he played a season and a half for Minnesota, with much reduced production.

=== Buffalo Sabres ===
Mired in a slump, Stanfield was traded to the Buffalo Sabres in the middle of the 1974–75 season for journeyman Norm Gratton and Buffalo's third round choice (Ron Zanussi) in the 1976 NHL Amateur Draft. He quickly broke out of his slump, scoring 33 points in 32 games for the Sabres, and contributing to the team's push to the Stanley Cup Final, where they eventually lost to the Philadelphia Flyers.

Stanfield played the next three seasons for Buffalo, ending his NHL career with the team in 1978. He played the next season for the Hershey Bears of the American Hockey League, retiring as a player partway through the season when he was named the interim coach for the team, serving through the end of the season. His last position in organized hockey was the 1980 season for the Niagara Falls Flyers of the OHA, when he was again named a mid-season replacement as head coach.

== Retirement and legacy ==
Stanfield played 914 career NHL games, scoring 211 goals and 405 assists for 616 points.

Two of Stanfield's brothers, Jim Stanfield and Jack Stanfield, also played in the NHL. His youngest brother, Vic Stanfield, was a two-time All-American for Boston University.

Stanfield maintained a residence in the Town of Mississauga as of 1969. Stanfield lived in the Buffalo area, and owned an office furniture store. He was an active member of the Buffalo Sabres Alumni Association and organized several alumni tournaments.

He died on September 13, 2021.

In 2023 he was named One of the Top 100 Best Bruins Players of all Time.

== Career statistics ==
=== Regular season and playoffs ===
			Regular season					Playoffs
Season	Team	League	GP	G	A	Pts	PIM	GP	G	A	Pts	PIM
1961–62	St. Catharines Teepees	OHA	49	11	15	26	19	6	0	0	0	2
1962–63	St. Catharines Black Hawks	OHA	48	28	39	67	25	—	—	—	—	—
1963–64	St. Catharines Black Hawks	OHA	56	34	75	109	29	13	15	12	27	4
1964–65	Chicago Black Hawks	NHL	57	7	10	17	14	14	2	1	3	2
1965–66	Chicago Black Hawks	NHL	39	2	2	4	2	5	0	0	0	2
1965–66	St. Louis Braves	CHL	24	7	11	18	2	—	—	—	—	—
1966–67	Chicago Black Hawks	NHL	10	1	0	1	0	1	0	0	0	0
1966–67	St. Louis Braves	CHL	37	20	21	41	10	—	—	—	—	—
1967–68	Boston Bruins	NHL	73	20	44	64	10	4	0	1	1	0
1968–69	Boston Bruins	NHL	71	25	29	54	22	10	2	2	4	0
1969–70	Boston Bruins	NHL	73	23	35	58	14	14	4	12	16	6
1970–71	Boston Bruins	NHL	75	24	52	76	12	7	3	4	7	0
1971–72	Boston Bruins	NHL	78	23	56	79	12	15	7	9	16	0
1972–73	Boston Bruins	NHL	78	20	58	78	10	5	1	1	2	0
1973–74	Minnesota North Stars	NHL	71	16	28	44	10	—	—	—	—	—
1974–75	Minnesota North Stars	NHL	40	8	18	26	12	—	—	—	—	—
1974–75	Buffalo Sabres	NHL	32	12	21	33	4	17	2	4	6	0
1975–76	Buffalo Sabres	NHL	80	18	30	48	4	9	0	1	1	0
1976–77	Buffalo Sabres	NHL	79	9	14	23	6	5	0	0	0	0
1977–78	Buffalo Sabres	NHL	57	3	8	11	2	—	—	—	—	—
1978–79	Hershey Bears	AHL	50	19	41	60	4	—	—	—	—	—
NHL totals			914	211	405	616	134	106	21	35	56	10
