= James Warden Stansfield =

British barrister and judge

His Honour James Warden Stansfield
- Born: 7 April 1906; Cheshire
- Died: 30 September 1991 (aged 85); Cheshire
- Education: University of Cambridge
- Occupations: Barrister; Judge
- Spouse: Florence Evelyn Holdcroft
- Children: 3
- Military career
- Allegiance: United Kingdom
- Branch: Royal Air Force
- Service years: 1939–1945
- Rank: Squadron Leader

James Warden Stansfield (7 April 1906 – 30 September 1991) was a British barrister and judge.

== Career ==
Stansfield was born in Cheshire on 7 April 1906 and was the son of James Hampson Stansfield. He was educated in Macclesfield and read law at the University of Cambridge before being called to the Bar in 1929 and practicing on the Northern Circuit.

He was unsuccessful when he stood for election as the Conservative Party candidate in the Manchester Platting constituency at the 1935 General Election. During World War II, he joined the Royal Air Force, rising to Squadron Leader and joining the staff of the Judge Advocate-General.

After the war, he served as Chairman of the Manchester Licensing Planning Committee from 1955 to 1963 amongst other Committees. He served as a County Court Judge and Circuit Judge from 1963 until his retirement in 1978. Stansfield married, in 1937, Florence Evelyn Holdcroft and they had three children. Stansfield died in 1991.
