= Jack Stansfield =

English footballer (b.1896)

Personal information
- Date of birth: 1896
- Place of birth: Bradford, England
- Position: Outside left

Senior career*
| Years | Team | Apps | (Gls) |
- Bradford (Park Avenue)
- Castleford Town
| 1919–1922 | Bradford City | 2 | (0) |
| 1922 | Hull City | 11 | (0) |
- Castleford Town
| Total | | 13 | (0) |
- * Club domestic league appearances and goals

Jack Stansfield (born 1896) was an English professional footballer who played as an outside left.

== Career ==
Born in Bradford, Stansfield spent his early career with Bradford (Park Avenue) and Castleford Town. He signed for Bradford City in August 1919, making 2 league appearances for the club, before signing for Hull City in January 1922. At Hull he made 11 league appearances before returning to Castleford Town.

His great-grandson James Stansfield was also a footballer; both played for Bradford (Park Avenue).

== Sources ==
- Frost, Terry (1988). Bradford City A Complete Record 1903–1988. Breedon Books Sport. ISBN 0-907969-38-0.
