= Video self-modeling =

Form of observational learning

Video self-modeling (VSM) is a form of observational learning in which individuals observe themselves performing a behavior successfully on video, and then imitate the targeted behavior. VSM allows individuals to view themselves being successful, acting appropriately, or performing new tasks. Peter Dowrick, a key researcher in the development of self-modeling, described two forms of VSM, feedforward and self-review. Self-review involves someone with a relatively well developed skill watching examples of best performance. A good example of this is the procedure used by Laura Wilkinson, gold medal platform diver, prior to every meet. In an interview after her gold medal performance, she was asked how she prepares for competition. She said that she watches a video that consists of her best dives along with encouragement from family and coaches. Self-review is mainly used in sports training as a form of visual imaging. Feedforward, on the other hand, is used with people who do not have a skill or when a new skill is emerging. Thus, feedforward is the method most often used in instructional or clinical settings. Because Feedforward involves new skills or behaviors performed by the viewer, it usually requires some degree of video editing to make it appear that the viewer is performing in an advanced manner. The term feedforward can be contrasted with the more traditional term feedback as it relates to receiving information about performance. Feedback allows people to see how they are doing. Feedforward allows them to see how they could be performing; a future self. Feedforward is mainly used in education and therapy circles and mainly with children with disabilities. It has been found to be especially effective with children with autism who tend to be visual learners and who seem to attend better to monitors than to live models.

== Background ==
Research across an array of behaviors and many types of disabilities has been ongoing since 1970 with very positive results. Researchers report that changes occur rapidly, there is good maintenance, and that changes generalize across settings. Adoption by educators and therapists has lagged behind the research possibly because of the technology requirements for editing videos. The advent of user-friendly editing software such as iMovie and Movie Maker has gone a long way in solving that problem. Another reason that the use of VSM seems to be gathering momentum is an article that appeared in 2007 by Scott Bellini and Jennifer Akulian. These researchers conducted a meta-analyses of all forms of video modeling and concluded that both peer and self-modeling met the Council for Exceptional Children's requirements for research-based methods. Self-modeling has several attributes that sets it apart as a good tool to use with children with disabilities. It uses only positive imagery which makes it fit well into most positive behavior support plans. Effects of VSM should be seen almost immediately. If change is not seen after two or three viewings, one can move quickly to an alternate intervention. Finally, there appears to be no real down-side to the method. No damage is done if it does not work for an individual. As Buggey states in his book, the only tangible outcome when no results are seen is that the person ends up with a flattering video of him or herself. In his book, Seeing is Believing, Tom Buggey lists three major ways video footage can be collected and compiled into a feedforward video:

1. Imitation – Particularly useful with language skills. Children are prompted to say words or phrases. Words can be new or rarely used and phrases and sentences can be longer or more complex than presently used. Individual words can even be extracted from videos using video editing software and joined into sentences.
2. Role playing – Particularly useful for social skills. Children act out scenes of proper behavior that are usually challenging for them. For example, the triggers of tantrums can be determined and then each trigger can become a scene in the VSM video – with the person performing appropriate alternative behaviors rather than tantruming.
3. Let the camera roll to capture rare behaviors – typically used with persons who cannot imitate or follow directions. This can be very time-consuming; however, it has been used effectively for eating problems. A child can be filmed during several lunch periods and best examples of appropriate eating (such as putting food to mouth) can be extracted and combined into a feedforward movie.

== Caveats ==
Although VSM has shown overwhelming success with a range of ages and types of disabilities it has had problematic results with children under 4 yrs and with persons with very severe cognitive disabilities (although it has been successful with children with severe autism). Users must use caution to not depict behavior that is far beyond the viewer's ability. Showing skills beyond the reach of individuals can cause frustration and work counter to the purpose of VSM. Both speech/language and physical or occupational therapists need to be consulted when the skills needing to be addressed fall within their areas of expertise. (update: 2017. Studies with children under the age of 4 were restricted to the training of social skills. However, The Dept. of Education in Minnesota (MDOE) funded a training project for its Birth to 3 caregivers in 2013. Participants were trained in the use of VSM and were required to record and report results to a MDOE supervisor. Over 90 personnel were trained and 87 submitted results. All but 3 reported positive results. The skills addressed were mainly functional and language-based. Because none of these cases involved training social interaction skills, it was hypothesized that use of VSM with children under 4 [as young as 2 yrs. 1 mo.] was practical for certain behaviors.)

Users should also be aware of the differences between self-modeling and self-observation. While self-modeling involves edited videos depicting only positive imagery, self-observation involves watching raw, unedited footage of behavior. The classic example of self-observation is watching game films in sports. Much can be gained by using self-observation; however, there is a risk that if behaviors viewed are too negative (e.g. a lineman missing blocking assignments 60% of the time) it could adversely affect self-confidence, and thus the performance of the viewer. Buggey suggests that use of self-observation with children with disabilities should be used with extreme caution.

== Theory behind self-modeling ==
Many self-modeling researchers point to Albert Bandura's studies on social learning as key to the understanding of the effectiveness of VSM. Bandura made two fundamental findings that relate directly to self modeling. The first is that the best models are those as close to the viewer as possible in all attributes including ability. You cannot get closer than when the model and viewer are the same person with only a slight change in ability. The other finding involves self-efficacy, the belief that one can succeed at a task. Bandura found that the higher the belief in success, the higher the success rate. Self-modeling allows children to see themselves succeeding, and increases self-efficacy (as long as the new behavior is attainable and developmentally appropriate).

One of the reasons VSM may work so well with social behaviors may have been uncovered by Thomas Kehle and colleagues. While working with children with emotional disorders who had had VSM intervention, they noticed that clients had difficulty remembering negative behaviors during exit interviews. They hypothesized that these individual were not only getting new memories based on VSM experiences, but they were also supplanting memories of the old behaviors. Their hypothesis was substantiated in the 2002 study. Their findings are preliminary and there have not been any published replications, but if substantiated, it raises both interesting methodological and ethical issues.

== Possible applications ==
Any behavior that can be observed, and thus filmed, can be a subject of a self-modeling video. In their meta-analysis article, Bellini and Akulian identified behaviors that were addressed in studies they evaluated. These include:

1. Cognitive skills such as math computation
2. Selective mutism
3. Language skills
4. Functional skills such as making beds or getting dressed
5. Physical skills such as swimming or lifting legs when walking
6. Depression
7. Stuttering
8. Oral reading fluency
