= Jean Stansfield Memorial Park =

Public park in Poulton-le-Fylde, Lancashire, England

- Vicarage Park
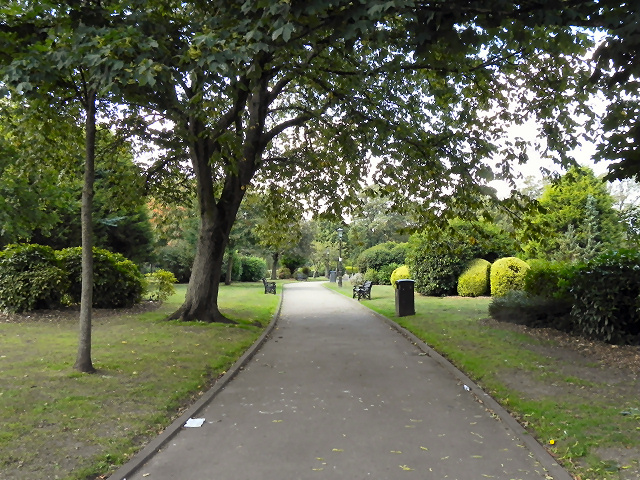
- Inside the park in 2011
- Interactive map of Jean Stansfield Memorial Park
- Type: Urban park
- Location: Station Road; Poulton-le-Fylde; Lancashire; England
- Coordinates: 53.84681708°N 2.98860570°W
- Owner: Wyre Borough Council
- Operator: Wyre Borough Council

Jean Stansfield Memorial Park (also known as Vicarage Park) is an urban children's park in the English market town of Poulton-le-Fylde. It is located on Station Road, at its junction with Vicarage Road, one of the main roads leading to and from the town centre.

The park is named for Jean Stansfield, who died on 27 September 1923, aged ten. She was the only child of Mr and Mrs S. F. Stansfield. Three years later, after the couple purchased a parcel of glebe land from St Chad's Church, the park was completed. It was dedicated to their daughter on 17 June 1926.

The park had a public bowling green, the town's first, added to it in June 1938. The park also now includes a skate park.
