= James Stanfield =

American educator and film producer

James S. Stanfield
- Education: UCLA (BA); California State University, Northridge (MA); USC (EdD)
- Occupations: Educator; Film Producer
- Known for: Developing the concept of Video Modeling
- Notable work: Founding James Stanfield Publishing, with video products including The LifeSmart Curriculum
- Awards: Academy Award for Technical Achievement (1979)

James Stanfield is an American professor and film producer. He is an Academy Award for Technical Achievement winner in 1979 and trademarked the term Video Modeling in 1999. He is also the founder of James Stanfield Publishing.

== Education and teaching ==
Stanfield has received a BA in Psychology from UCLA, MA in Educational Psychology from California State University, Northridge, and a EdD in Special Education/Instructional Design from USC. During his doctoral studies he received a Bureau of Health & Education doctoral fellowship in mental retardation from USC. He later taught as a Professor of Special Education at the CSULA Graduate Department of Intellectual and Developmental Disabilities, as well as a special education instructor within the Los Angeles City Schools.

== Film career ==
Stanfield, alongside Paul W. Trester, was the recipient of an Academy Award for Technical Achievement in 1979 for the development and manufacture of a device for the repair or protection of sprocket holes in motion picture film. In 1999 Stanfield trademarked the term Video Modeling, for a "series of video tapes that teach appropriate social behavior to special education students, by use of professional actors and actresses who demonstrate appropriate behavior (wrong way/right way)". The trademark was renewed in 2009. The tape series were produced through the company James Stanfield Publishing.

Jennifer Bailey described video modeling as "a teaching concept that uses trained actors to 'model' three different ways to respond to challenges by a 'difficult person' and what might be the positive or negative consequences of each. The videos can be used by parents and educators. Each module covers a different type of difficult behavior — criticism, teasing, bullying, anger against others, and anger against the self. It includes 'Video Modeling' scenarios and a comprehensive Teacher/Parent Guide with separate videos and guides for lower and upper level elementary, middle school and high school students."

One of the main themes Stanfield has worked with in film is sex education, especially for the mentally disabled and those with other handicaps. In 1972 the American Association on Mental Retardation's Social/Sexual Concerns Group presented James Stanfield with the 1st Annual Award For Development of Socio-Sexual Training Materials for People with Disabilities for his work in the field. These and other videos are used in every school district in the United States to teach both disabled and regular students about sex education. They are also used in Canadian school systems as well as those of other countries. Another video series Stanfield developed was the BeCool series, which is used to help students deal with teasing and bullying.
