= Stansfield =

Village in Suffolk, England

Coordinates: 52.138°N 0.607°E

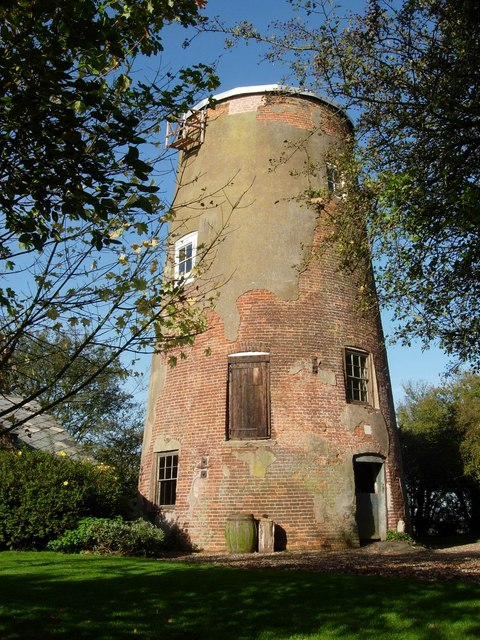
- Stansfield Windmill

- Location within Suffolk
- Population: 221 (2011)
- OS grid reference: TL783525
- District: West Suffolk
- Shire county: Suffolk
- Region: East
- Country: England
- Sovereign state: United Kingdom
- Post town: Sudbury
- Postcode district: CO10
- Dialling code: 01284
- Police: Suffolk
- Fire: Suffolk
- Ambulance: East of England
- UK Parliament: South Suffolk

Stansfield is a village and civil parish in the West Suffolk district of Suffolk in eastern England. Located seven miles south-west of Bury St Edmunds, in 2011 its population was 221. The village has an Anglican church dedicated to All Saints. In 1870, John Marius Wilson's Imperial Gazetteer of England and Wales described Stansfield as

"A parish, with S. village and Assington-Green hamlet, in Risbridge district, Suffolk; 5 miles N by E of Clare r. station. It has a post-office under Sudbury. Acres, 1,989. Real property, £2,998. Pop., 549. Houses, 109. The property is divided among a few. The living is a rectory in the diocese of Ely. Value, £500.* Patron, the Lord Chancellor. There are an Independent chapel, and charities £11".

== History ==
In Old English, Stansfield would have been interpreted as ‘Stan’s open land’, referring to someone's unencumbered and arable land in which they owned at the time. Earliest History of Stansfield dates back to 1066 in the Domesday Book, where the value to the Lord was £3.50. The Lords of Stansfield in 1066 were Crawa, Edric Spud and Wulffled.

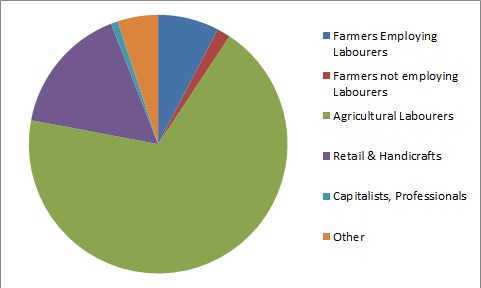
Occupational data of males of Stansfield, as reported by the census of 1831

In 1831, the main source of industry in Stansfield was Agricultural labourers, followed by Retail & Handicrafts. The least common trade was Capitalists & Professionals. Labourers and servants occupied 81 jobs in 1831, 21 as middling sorts and 10 as employers and professionals.

In 1881, the introduction of women's occupations on the census was initiated. While 87 males remained working in the agricultural sector, 15 females were engaged in domestic offices and services, 12 of which were domestic indoor servants. 72 females were classified as ‘unknown occupation’, compared to just one male.

Between 1837 and 1889 Stansfield was part of the Risbridge Registration District and the Suffolk County. On 1 April 1889 however, Stansfield became part of the West Suffolk County, where it remained so until 1938. In 1938 Risbridge Registration District lost several parishes, of which Stansfield was one. On 1 July 1938 Stansfield became part of the Newmarket Registration District.

== Demographics ==
Stansfield population was 221 in 2011, of which 117 were economically active and 57 economically inactive. Of the inactive population 27 were retired. The population of Stansfield has been declining since the 1850s. In 1841 the population peaked at 510 but, by 1961 it had declined to 186, as seen in the 'Current Total Population graph'. This suggests that between 1841 and 1961 people began to move from rural communities and parishes to bigger cities such as London where there was work emerging in the factories and the industrial sector. This follows the average trend of the country for that period.

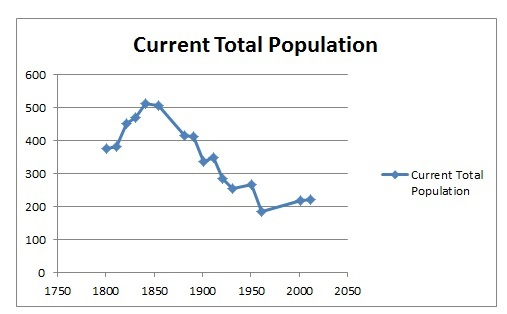
Total population of Stansfield as reported by the Census of Population from 1801 to 2011.

In 2011, the industry employing the most people in Stansfield was construction with 13 people. Additionally the second most popular was professional, scientific and technical activities with 12 people. The least common industry in the parish was Public Administration and Defence with 3 people, showing a clear shift in industry since the 19th century.

According to the 2011 census, 56% of the people living in Stansfield were Christian, slightly below the national average which was 59.4%, as well as the 2001 percentage of Christians in Stansfield which was 69%. 32% stated no religion in the 2011 census.

In terms of housing, there was a peak of houses in 1851 when there was 116. From the first census data in 1831, it is clear that there was a rapid increase in housing between 1831 and 1841 where there was an increase from 62 houses to 105. This continued to increase until 1851. Over the next 30 years houses began to decrease as people would have moved to cities such as London in search of factory work. Between 1901 and 1961 houses remained in the numbers of 70 to 80. By 2011 the number of houses in the parish had increased to 92, an increase of nine from the 2001 census.

== Church ==
With 56% of the local population classified as Christian, the local church; All Saints Church has always played a pivotal role within the community. The church itself is flint-fronted and is situated at the north end of the village on Plough Hill. History of the church dates back to the time of the Norman conquest. Very little of the original church still exists, In 1896 the 70 foot, fourteenth century, Norman erected foot tower was restored and new tower bells were introduced. In regards to the size of the church, it can be considered large in comparison to the size of the parish and local population. It was restored again recently, through efforts of the Stansfield Church Restoration Committee and the whole village. Within the church a war memorial can be found to commemorate the Stansfield men that lost their lives in the First and Second World Wars. On the memorial it states;

"Greater love hath no man than this, that a man lay down his life for his friends" St John

In total, ten men lost their lives, eight in the First World War and two in the Second World War.

Between the years of 1642 and 1661 no marriages were registered in Stansfield. It appears that under the act of 1653, marriage became a civil ceremony, thus the functions of the Clergy were transferred to the Justices of Peace; and the registers of such marriages may have been kept elsewhere. From 1653 to 1660, it is noticeable that the entries of births, baptisms and burials are well kept and written in English. The last entry under the commonwealth in English was on 3 May 1660. The next being on 14 August of the same year but in Latin. Latin was in continued use until 1732.

== Community ==
Stansfield parish features a book club, village fete, bridge club, cricket club and a monthly newsletter. With a low population, each activity allows the community spirit to remain high. The Parish features its own council, which discusses community concerns and events taking place. Typically made up of six residents of the community. In terms of schools in the local area, the closest primary school is 2.9 miles away from Stansfield and is Wickhambrook Community Primary School, while the closest secondary school is 4.3 miles away and is Stour Valley Community School.

== Present Day ==
The Parish of Stansfield is still rather inaccessible via public transport. The closest railway station is 12.1 miles away and is in Sudbury. Stansfield is part of Suffolk ACRE's Community Buying Enterprise which helps residents to save money on heating oil within households.
