= Stansfeld =

- Pronunciation: /ˈstænsfiːld/ STANSS-feeld
- Language: English

Origin
- Language: English
- Meaning: "stony field"

Other names
- Variant forms: Stansfield, Stanfield, Standfield

Stansfeld is an English surname deriving from the Old English 'stan' (meaning stony) and 'feld' (field). This toponymic surname originates from the ancient township of Stansfield (near Todmorden, West Yorkshire), which was listed in the Domesday Book of 1086 as 'Stanesfelt’. The surname is most commonly found around the town of Todmorden, West Yorkshire.

Notable people with this surname include:

== Stansfeld (surname) ==
- Anthony Stansfeld (b.1945), English Conservative politician and Thames Valley Police and Crime Commissioner
- Caroline Ashurst Stansfeld (1816–89), English activist and wife of James Stansfeld
- Hamer Stansfeld (1797–1865), British merchant, activist, author and Liberal Mayor of Leeds
- James Stansfeld (1820–98), English Liberal politician and President of the Local Government Board
- James Rawdon Stansfeld (1866–1936), English army officer
- John Stansfeld (1855–1939), English Anglican priest, physician, and founder of Stansfeld Oxford and Bermondsey Club Football Club
- John Raymond Evelyn Stansfeld (1880–1915), English army officer
- Margaret Stansfeld (1860–1951), English educator, and founder and Principal of the Bedford Physical Training College
- Thomas Wolryche Stansfeld (1877–1935), English army officer

== Stansfeld (given name) ==
- Grey Owl or Archibald Stansfeld Belaney (1888–1938), British writer and environmentalism (also known as Grey Owl)
- Charles Stansfeld Jones or Charles Robert Stansfeld Jones (1886–1950), English accountant, occultist and ceremonial magician (also known as Frater Ashad)
- Timothy Stansfeld Engleheart (1803–79), English engraver

== See also ==
- Stansfield, West Yorkshire
- Stansfield (surname)
- Stansfield (disambiguation)
- Field House, Sowerby
- Dunninald Castle
