= Stansfield, West Yorkshire =

Human settlement in Todmorden, West Yorkshire, England

Coordinates: 53.7185°N 2.0912°W

Stansfield
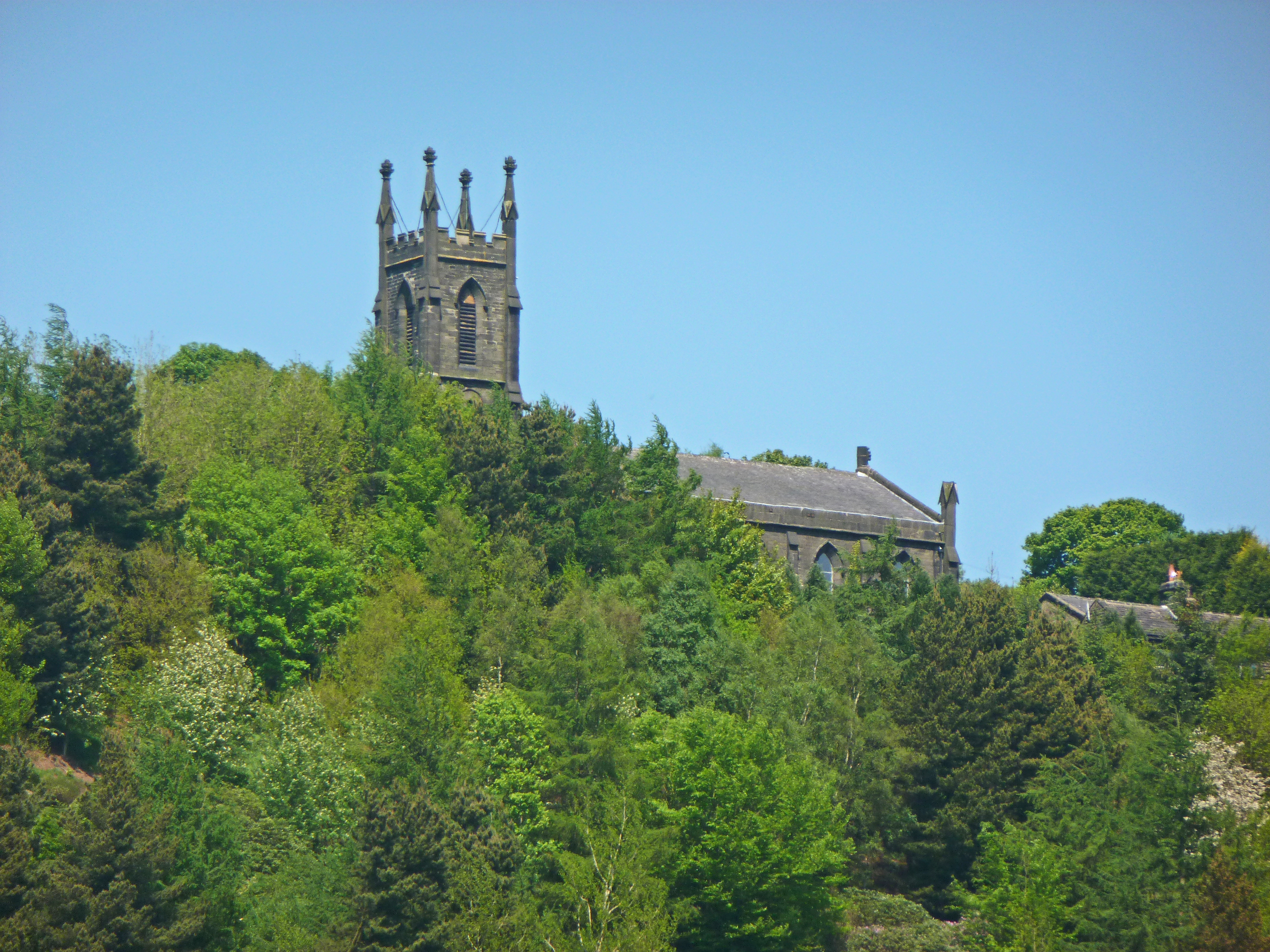
- St Paul's Church, Cross Stone, Stansfield, Todmorden in 2012

- Location within West Yorkshire
- Civil parish: Todmorden
- Metropolitan borough: Calderdale
- Metropolitan county: West Yorkshire
- Region: Yorkshire and the Humber
- Country: England
- Sovereign state: United Kingdom
- Post town: Todmorden
- Postcode district: OL14
- Dialling code: 01706
- Police: West Yorkshire
- Fire: West Yorkshire
- Ambulance: Yorkshire
- UK Parliament: Calder Valley

Stansfield (/ˈstænsfiːld/ STANSS-feeld) is a place in the civil parish of Todmorden, in the Calderdale district, in West Yorkshire, England, which gave its name to Stansfield Hall, Stansfield Hall railway station, and an electoral ward.

== History ==
The area comprising Stansfield extends from Stansfield Moor in the Pennines to the banks of the River Calder in Todmorden.

Historically, the township of Stansfield was considered within the manor of Wakefield which was granted, after the Norman Conquest, to William de Warenne, 1st Earl of Surrey. The earl then granted the manor of Stansfield to his sub-tenant John de Thornhill, and it later passed to the Savile family. In terms of ecclesiastical organisation, Stansfield was one of the townships in the chapelry of Heptonstall within the ancient parish of Halifax. In 1866 Stansfield became a separate civil parish, on 30 September 1897 the parish was abolished to form Todmorden. In 1891 the parish had a population of 11,266.

Following the Local Government Act 1894, the Todmorden Local Board became an urban district council, comprising the wards of Todmorden, Walsden, Langfield and Stansfield. Under the Local Government Act 1972, the West Riding of Yorkshire was abolished and Stansfield has since formed part of the metropolitan borough of Calderdale, in West Yorkshire. Stansfield remains an electoral ward within the township of Todmorden.

== Stansfield family ==
Wyon Maryons, lord of the lordship of Stansfield, was reputed to have been the descendant of a noble line from Brittany who accompanied William the Conqueror to England, and received a grant of the lands and lordship of Stansfield. His descendant, Jordan, later assumed the surname Stansfield. Jordan de Stansfield reputedly married a daughter of Sir John Towneley of the Towneley family, and their descendants included Oliver de Stansfield (who was Constable of Pontefract Castle), and Joanna Stansfield, Prioress of Kirklees Priory (d. 1499).

The exact descent of this family and its various branches remains uncertain until the 15th century. By the early modern period, various Stansfield (Stansfeld) families populated Stansfield, Shore, and the neighbouring parishes of Todmorden, Heptonstall, Halifax, Sowerby, and Hartshead in Yorkshire, and Rochdale in Lancashire. James Stansfield of Stansfield Hall was resident there in the 1640s. In the 17th century, the Sowerby branch of the family reverted to an earlier spelling of the name (Stansfeld) and lived at Field House, Sowerby and later Dunninald Castle in Scotland.

== St Paul's Church, Cross Stone, Stansfield ==
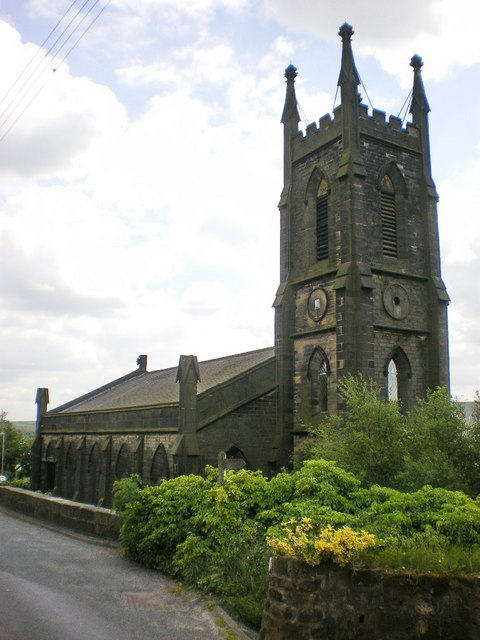
St Paul's Church, Cross Stone, Stansfield, Todmorden in 2009

Cross Stone takes its name from an ancient stone cross near the site of the settlement. The tradition was that the church was built by a Stansfield of Stansfield Hall in Stansfield. The church, dedicated to St Paul, was in existence in 1537 but was rebuilt in 1832. It was decommissioned in 1979 and is now a private residence.
