= Ryburn =

Ryburn may refer to:

== Geography ==
- River Ryburn, in West Yorkshire, England
- Ryburn Reservoir, in West Yorkshire, England
- Ryburn Valley High School, in West Yorkshire, England
- Listed buildings in Ryburn
- Halifax station (Nova Scotia), in Halifax, Nova Scotia, Canada
- Halifax station (MBTA), in Halifax, Massachusetts, United States

== People ==
- Jocelyn Ryburn, President of the New Zealand Plunket Society
- Hubert Ryburn, New Zealand Presbyterian minister and university college master
- Bruce Ryburn Payne, American educator
