= Our School (TV series) =

- Genre: Entertainment; Documentary; Reality television
- Created by: BBC
- Directed by: Cher Adamson; Chris Chapman; Matt Grosch; Jamie McLeish
- Voices of: Jonathan Thoburn (Series 1 & 2017 Special, 2018 Special, 2019 Special); Trevor Evans (Series 2 & 2017 Special, 2018 Special, 2019 Special); Martin Jones (Series 3 & 2018 Special) Ben Shore (2019 Special); Ewan Nicoll (Series 4 & 2019 Special); Shirley Ballas (Our School Summer Camp); Helena Worth (Series 5 & Series 6); Brandon Swain (Series 6); Lily Kerbey (Series 7); Diane Morgan (Series 8)
- Theme music composer: Sam Gale
- Opening theme: "Our School"
- Ending theme: "Our School"
- Country of origin: United Kingdom
- Original language: English
- No. of series: 7

Production
- Executive producers: Kez Margrie; Richard Marson
- Producers: Vanessa Singh; Natasha Cox; Matt Grosch; Cher Adamson; Chris Chapman; Jamie McLeish
- Production locations: Conyers School, Stockton-on-Tees (Series 1); Greenwood Academy, Birmingham (Series 2); Firth Park Academy, Sheffield (Series 3); Shawlands Academy, Glasgow (Series 4); Hawthorn High School, Pontypridd (Series 5); Ryburn Valley High School, Calderdale (Series 6); Firth Park Academy, Sheffield (Series 7); Badminton School, Bristol (Series 8)
- Editor: Various
- Camera setup: Multi camera Dual cameras
- Running time: 22 - 30 minutes
- Production company: Twofour

Original release
- Network: CBBC (2014–2022)
- Release: 3 September 2014 – 21 October 2022

Our School is a British documentary reality television programme on CBBC which first aired on 3 September 2014 and has run for eight series. It uses a fly-on-the-wall format to show the everyday lives of the staff and pupils in secondary schools and follows children as they move from Year 6 into Year 7. From series 5 onwards, the series featured pupils in both Year 7 and Year 8.

In 2019, a spin-off called Our School Summer Camp was made, featuring students from series 1, 2 and 3, and some new students, joined by headteacher Shirley Ballas.

== Series overview ==
Series	Episodes	Originally aired	
Series	Episodes	First aired	Last aired
1	16	3 September 2014	7 September 2015
2	15	5 January 2016	19 April 2016
3	15	5 September 2017	12 December 2017
4	20	7 August 2018	18 December 2018
5	20	3 September 2019	10 December 2019
6	22	26 August 2020	23 December 2020
7	20	6 September 2021	28 January 2022
8	20	26 September 2022	21 October 2022

== Development and production ==
Our School was commissioned in September 2013 by the production company TwoFour and CBBC (the children's television brand owned by the BBC and primarily aimed at children aged between the ages of 7 and 16). Each series of programmes follows the day-to-day school life of 11-year-olds as they transition from different primary schools to embark on their first year at a secondary school and the commencement of their Key Stage 3 education. The programme uses a fly-on-the-wall camera approach to record the trials and tribulations, the joys and the sorrows, and the successes and surprises, of eleven Year 7 pupils throughout the whole academic year. Each series is filmed in a different school.

Our School was publicly announced in early 2014. The series follows the same overall format as Educating..., another documentary reality television programme on Channel 4 from the same production company which was first broadcast in September 2011 and which also uses fly-on-the-wall cameras.

Our School has run for eight series on CBBC and BBC iPlayer to date, with each series having between 15 and 20 episodes, and with each episode focusing on a particular event, group of students or storyline. In addition, there have been multiple specials in which students and schools from previous series are revisited.

== Episodes ==
=== Series 1 (2014–15) ===
The first series was filmed at Conyers School in the town of Yarm near Middlesbrough. It showed the Year 7 classes experiencing secondary school for the first time and featured some of the challenges they may face in later life.

The first series was made up of 15x30 minute episodes and began to be broadcast on 3 September 2014. The final episode of the series was aired on 10 December 2014.

In 2015, it was announced that a special episode would be added to the first series. This aired on 7 September 2015 and was a catch-up episode that saw the cameras return to see what had happened to the Year 7 pupils, who were now in Year 8.

No. overall	Title	Original release date
1	We are Year 7	3 September 2014
2	New Horizons	10 September 2014
3	Meet the Teachers	17 September 2014
4	In Trouble	24 September 2014
5	Finding Friends	1 October 2014
6	Double Take	8 October 2014
7	Goals	15 October 2014
8	I Hate Quiet	22 October 2014
9	Making Progress	29 October 2014
10	Three Is a Magic Number	5 November 2014
11	Behave Yourself	12 November 2014
12	The Beautiful Game	19 November 2014
13	Nothing to Be Scared Of	26 November 2014
14	Love Is in the Air	3 December 2014
15	Christmas Is Coming	10 December 2014
16	Special: What Happened Next?	7 September 2015

=== Series 2 (2016) ===
The second series of Our School was filmed at Greenwood Academy in Castle Vale near Birmingham.

This series began airing on 5 January 2016 and ran for 15 weeks, with the final episode being broadcast on 12 April 2016. It was retitled Our School 2 and followed the same format as Series 1.

No. overall	Title	Original release date
17	New Starts	5 January 2016
18	On The Ball	12 January 2016
19	Getting Ahead	19 January 2016
20	Find Your Focus	26 January 2016
21	Change Your Ways	2 February 2016
22	Going Forward, Stepping Back	9 February 2016
23	You've Got A Friend	16 February 2016
24	Who Am I?	23 February 2016
25	My Camera Never Lies	1 March 2016
26	Helping Out	8 March 2016
27	The Hunger Game	15 March 2016
28	We Can Be Heroes	22 March 2016
29	Where The Heart Is	29 March 2016
30	In It To Win It	5 April 2016
31	Show Stopper	12 April 2016

=== Series 3 (2017) ===
Before the launch of the third series there was a one-off special, which saw two students, one from Series 1 and one from Series 2, swap schools for a day and get to know and interact with the other students. The special aired in August 2017.

The first episode of Series 3 of Our School was broadcast on 5 September 2017. It was filmed at Firth Park Academy in the Shiregreen area of Sheffield.

No. overall	Title	Original release date
33	New Faces	5 September 2017
34	True Colours	12 September 2017
35	A Goal For Wayne	19 September 2017
36	Meaty Matters	26 September 2017
37	Just the Job	3 October 2017
38	I Can't Do It...Yet	10 October 2017
39	Show Me the Funny	17 October 2017
40	There's No i In Team	24 October 2017
41	The Ghost of Firth Park	31 October 2017
42	Repping and Rapping	7 November 2017
43	Swap the Teacher	14 November 2017
45	Tricky Business	21 November 2017
46	African Adventure	28 November 2017
47	Moves Like Michael	5 December 2017
48	Strictly Year Seven	12 December 2017

Special: When Conyers Met Greenwood

=== Series 4 (2018) ===
The fourth series was filmed in Scotland, at Shawlands Academy in the Shawlands area of Glasgow.

Episodes
Episode Number	Episode Name	Original Air Date
1	The New Boy	11 August 2018
2	Laugh Out Loud	18 August 2018
3	Give Us a Try	25 August 2018
4	I'm Not Your Dude	1 September 2018
5	It's Great Outdoors	8 September 2018
6	A Piece of Cake	15 September 2018
7	Something New	22 September 2018
8	Frenemies	29 September 2018
9	Try Being Me	6 October 2018
10	Express Yourself	13 October 2018
11	You Can't Win 'Em All	20 October 2018
12	We're All Scottish	27 October 2018
13	Deaducation	3 November 2018
14	Back in the Day	10 November 2018
15	Paws for Thought	13 November 2018
16	And Then They Were Eight	17 November 2018
17	Eyes on the Prize	24 November 2018
18	In at the Deep End	1 December 2018
19	Passion for Fashion	8 December 2018
20	Edinburgh - Here We Come!	15 December 2018
21	So This Is Christmas	18 December 2018

SPECIALS:

- One Last Term
- Moving Day
- Return to Firth Park

=== Our School Summer Camp (2019) ===
Episodes
Episode Number	Episode Name	Original Air Date
1	Say hello to your new home	19 August 2019
2	It's only a game	20 August 2019
3	Dance as though no-one's watching	21 August 2019
4	I'm clearly a pumpkin	22 August 2019
5	'It's easier to be bad, but it's better to be good	23 August 2019
6	Clay has feelings too	26 August 2019
7	I can do it if I try	27 August 2019
8	Three cheers for Tyrese	28 August 2019
9	Friends for life	29 August 2019
10	No time to be sad	30 August 2019

=== Series 5 (2019) ===
The fifth series was filmed in south Wales, at Hawthorn High School (Ysgol Uwchradd Y Hawthorn) in the village of Hawthorn, Rhondda Cynon Taf near Pontypridd. In a new feature, for the first time year 8 pupils were also featured alongside the year 7 pupils in the show.

Episodes
Episode Number	Episode Name	Original Air Date
1	A Brand New Term	3 September 2019
2	A Class Full of Chickens	10 September 2019
3	When School Sucked	17 September 2019
4	Here Comes Trouble	24 September 2019
5	Plastic Not Fantastic	1 October 2019
6	Lessons in Gunge	8 October 2019
7	A Slice of Pizza	15 October 2019
8	Face Your Fears	22 October 2019
9	Partners in Crime	29 October 2019
10	Our Scary Movie	29 October 2019 (iPlayer Exclusive)
11	Teaching Me Tidy	5 November 2019
12	Leap of Faith	5 November 2019 (iPlayer Exclusive)
13	Vote for Me	12 November 2019
14	Can't Play Will Play!	12 November 2019 (iPlayer Exclusive)
15	And Then They Were Eight	19 November 2019
16	Would You Eat Frogs Legs	19 November 2019 (iPlayer Exclusive)
17	Keep Calm and Carry On	26 November 2019
18	The Magic of Christmas	3 December 2019
19	Get Your Act Together	10 December 2019
20	Our School Rocks	10 December 2019 (iPlayer Exclusive)
21	SPECIAL: How We've Changed	September 2019
22	SPECIAL: Taking The Boys Out Of Sheffield	September 2019

=== Series 6 (2020) ===
Series 6 was filmed at Ryburn Valley High School in the town of Sowerby Bridge in the Upper Calder Valley of West Yorkshire. The first episode was broadcast on 26 August 2020.

Episodes
Episode Number	Episode Name	Original Air Date
Lockdown Special 1	Lockdown: 1	iPlayer Exclusive
Lockdown Special 2	Lockdown: 2	iPlayer Exclusive
1	Every Dream Counts	26 August 2020
2	The Power Of Yet	2 September 2020
3	Twinfinity And Beyond	9 September 2020
4	Don't Touch My Crocodile	16 September 2020
5	The Appliance of Science	iPlayer Exclusive
6	Teacher's Pet	23 September 2020
7	Where There's a Wheel	30 September 2020
8	Operation Prank	iPlayer Exclusive
9	Trick Or Teach	iPlayer Exclusive
10	Anything I Can Do We Can Do Better	7 October 2020
11	Change the World with Kindness	14 October 2020
12	Age Is Just A Number	iPlayer Exclusive
13	I'm With the Band	21 October 2020
14	The Forgotten Room	28 October 2020
15	Think Before You Sink	iPlayer Exclusive
16	Set Your Fear on Fire	4 November 2020
17	If At First You Don't Succeed	iPlayer Exclusive
18	The Seeds of Change	11 November 2020
19	Less Chat More Action	iPlayer Exclusive
20	The Christmas Express	18 November 2020
21	The Show Must Go On	25 November 2020
22	One Last Dance	2 December 2020

=== Series 7 (2021-2022) ===
Series 7, filmed at Firth Park Academy, started broadcasting on CBBC on 6 September 2021. The series consists of 20 episodes aired over selected weeks of the Autumn and Spring terms of the current academic year as part of the Bitesize programming block. The first ten episodes aired during the first two weeks of the school year before taking a break. The series resumed with the remaining ten episodes from 17 January 2022. The episodes were made available on iPlayer as well.

Episodes
Episode Number	Episode Name	Original Air Date
1	Bin Those Fears	6 September 2021
2	That’ll Teach Them	7 September 2021
3	The Pet Test	8 September 2021
4	The Rabbit Whisperer	9 September 2021
5	Mind Games	10 September 2021
6	Viva Espana!	13 September 2021
7	There's No Planet B	14 September 2021
8	Takeover Day	15 September 2021
9	Grow Your Own Library	16 September 2021
10	From Ramadan to Eid	17 September 2021
11	You Snooze You Lose	17 January 2022
12	Puppy Love	18 January 2022
13	Growing Pains	19 January 2022
14	This Little Piggy	20 January 2022
15	How to Be a Winner	21 January 2022
16	King Tim and the Big Art Scam	24 January 2022
17	Cool to Be Kind	25 January 2022
18	You're Hired	26 January 2022
19	Just Be Fierce	27 January 2022
20	Brave The Stage	28 January 2022

=== Series 8 (2022) Our Boarding School ===
Series 8 was filmed at Badminton School, an independent boarding and day school for girls in Westbury-on-Trym, Bristol. The series was scheduled to start on 12 September 2022 but was delayed to a later date due to the death of Elizabeth II. As such, the BBC iPlayer synopsis for the episode "Pen Pals" has a notice saying that it was filmed in 2021 before her death, as she is mentioned in the present tense once. The series is narrated by Diane Morgan.

Episodes
Episode Number	Episode Name	Original Air Date
1	Away from Home	26 September 2022
2	Around the House	27 September 2022
3	Year of the Tiger	28 September 2022
4	Watch This Space	29 September 2022
5	Braving the Storm	30 September 2022
6	All About Emily	3 October 2022
7	Join the Club	4 October 2022
8	All the Feels	5 October 2022
9	School of Rock	6 October 2022
10	Pen Pals	7 October 2022
11	New to the Nest	10 October 2022
12	Can You Cook It?	11 October 2022
13	House Wars	12 October 2022
14	What's On Your Mind?	13 October 2022
15	How it Started/How it's Going	14 October 2022
16	Take the Plunge	17 October 2022
17	The Staff of Destiny	18 October 2022
18	How to Get a Head	19 October 2022
19	Prom Planners	20 October 2022
20	School, Good Vibes Only	21 October 2022
