= St David's Catholic College =

Sixth form college in Cardiff, Wales

Coordinates: 51.50177°N 3.16578°W

- Coleg Catholig Dewi Sant
- Type: Sixth form college
- Established: 1987
- Religious affiliation: Roman Catholic
- Chairman: Christian Mahoney
- Principal: Geraint Williams
- Academic staff: 130
- Students: 1700
- Location: Ty Gwyn Road, Penylan, Cardiff, Wales, United Kingdom, CF23 5QD
- Campus: Urban
- Language: English
- Website: www.stdavidscollege.ac.uk

St David's Catholic Sixth Form College (Welsh: Coleg Chweched Dosbarth Catholig Dewi Sant) is a sixth form college located in Cardiff, Wales. It is the only Roman Catholic sixth form college in Wales. St. David's College is consistently rated good and excellent by Estyn inspectors.

== History ==
St. David's College opened in 1987 with an age range between 16 and 19 years. It occupies the building previously used by Heathfield High School, a defunct Roman Catholic High School. The majority of students live in Cardiff, although admissions priority is given to students from Roman Catholic secondary schools in the surrounding area. These schools include Corpus Christi High School, Mary Immaculate High School and St Illtyd's Catholic High School.

In 2019, controversy arose when Rhondda Cynon Taf County Borough Council planned to close the sixth forms of Pontypridd High School, Hawthorn High School, and Cardinal Newman Roman Catholic School, Rhydyfelin, with a significant number of pupils potentially being diverted to St. David's College (particularly from Cardinal Newman). Outcries led to an appeal in the High Court, which ruled in favour of protecting places at the existing sixth forms.

== Academics ==
Courses offered by St David's include GCSEs, BTECs, A levels and the Welsh Baccalaureate. Nearly 30 different AS and A Level courses are offered. In addition to the Level 2 and Level 3 courses offered, a Level 4 'Honours Programme' is available to students aspiring to go to universities such as Oxford and Cambridge.

== Chapel ==
The college has a dedicated chapel for prayer, reflection and mass.

== Notable alumni ==
- Jessica Leigh Jones (b. 1994) – engineer and astrophysicist
- Jeremiah Azu (b. 2001) – athlete
- Nasser Muthana (b. 1994) – Islamic State of Iraq and the Levant member
