= Listed buildings in Ryburn =

Ryburn is a ward to the southwest of Halifax in the metropolitan borough of Calderdale, West Yorkshire, England. It contains 84 listed buildings that are recorded in the National Heritage List for England. Of these, two are listed at Grade I, the highest of the three grades, three are at Grade II*, the middle grade, and the others are at Grade II, the lowest grade. The largest settlement in the ward is the village of Sowerby. There are some smaller settlements, including Mill Bank, but the rest of the ward is essentially rural. There is an industrial complex to the southeast of Sowerby around a former mill, Mill House Estate, and some of the buildings in this complex are listed. The River Ryburn runs through the ward, and a bridge crossing it is listed. Most of the listed buildings are houses and associated structures, cottages, farmhouses and farm buildings. The other listed buildings include churches, items in a churchyard, a public house, a milepost, former mills, a mill chimney, and a former chapel.

== Key ==
Grade	Criteria
I	Buildings of exceptional interest, sometimes considered to be internationally important
II*	Particularly important buildings of more than special interest
II	Buildings of national importance and special interest

== Buildings ==
Name and location	Photograph	Date	Notes	Grade
Castle Hill, Sowerby; 53.70591°N 1.94110°W	—	16th century	The house has a timber framed core, it was encased in stone in the 17th century, and has since been altered. It has a stone slate roof with coped gables, two storeys, and a truncated T-shaped plan. A gabled bay faces the street, and there is a later wing on the left. The windows have double-chamfered mullions, and the doorway in the wing has a chamfered lintel.	II
Barn northwest of Deerstones Farmhouse; 53.69580°N 1.94268°W	—	16th century	The barn has a timber framed core and has been clad in stone. There is one storey, and it consists of a three-bay aisled hall and a later two-bay aisled cross-wing. Most of the windows are mullioned. In the hall range is a 19th-century doorway, and a blocked doorway with a chamfered quoined surround and a Tudor arched head. At the rear is a cart entry.	II
Ball Green and Ball Green Cottage; 53.70414°N 1.94810°W		c. 1600	A house, later rebuilt at the rear and divided, is in stone on a chamfered plinth, with quoins, and a stone slate roof with coped gables and shaped kneelers. There are two storeys and three bays, gabled at the front and rear, with the front of the left bay truncated. On the front, in the middle bay there is a porch and a doorway with a chamfered quoined surround, in the right bay is a doorway with a plain surround, and at the rear the doorway has a fanlight and a tall incised keystone, and the remains above it of a datestone. The windows are mullioned and some have hood moulds.	II
Old Hall and Field House; 53.70007°N 1.93887°W		Early 17th century (probable)	A house, altered in the 19th century, and divided into two dwellings, it is in stone with an eaves finial and a stone slate roof. There are three storeys and five bays. The left doorway has a segmental arch, imposts and a keystone, and the doorway to the right has a Tudor arch with imposts. The windows are mullioned; above the ground floor openings is a continuous hood mould, stepped over the doorways, and over the middle floor windows are separate decorative hood moulds.	II
Old Haugh End and Cottage; 53.70391°N 1.92158°W	—	Early 17th century	The house, which possibly incorporates earlier material, has been divided into two dwellings. It is in stone with quoins, and a stone slate roof with coped gables and ball finials. There are two storeys and a front of three gabled bays, the right bay projecting. In the angle is a porch with a Tudor arch and chamfered coping, and an inner doorway with a chamfered and quoined surround and a similar arch. The windows are mullioned, some also have transoms, and some have hood moulds.	II
Upper Field House Farmhouse; 53.70161°N 1.94312°W	—	Early 17th century (probable)	A house that was divided in the 19th century, it is in stone with a hipped stone slate roof. There are two storeys and four bays. On the front is a gabled porch, the doorways have plain surrounds, and most of the windows are mullioned, some with arched lights.	II
The Royd, Sowerby; 53.70581°N 1.94069°W		1632	A house, later divided into two, it is in stone with quoins and a stone slate roof. There are two storeys and two bays. In each bay is a doorway on the right, the left doorway has a plain surround, and the doorway in the right bay has a chamfered quoined surround and an arched lintel with dated panels. The windows are mullioned.	II
Field End; 53.69467°N 1.93831°W	—	Early to mid 17th century	A farmhouse, later a private house, it is in stone with quoins and a stone slate roof. There are two storeys, three bays, and a two-bay outshut at the rear. The windows are mullioned, and some have hood moulds.	II
Lower Wood Lane Farmhouse and barn 53.71007°N 1.93658°W	—	Early to mid 17th century	The barn was added to the farmhouse in the 18th century, and the buildings are in stone with stone slate roofs. The house has quoins, two storeys and three bays. On the front is a gabled porch, and a doorway with a chamfered quoined surround and a dated lintel. The windows are mullioned and some have hood moulds. The barn to the right has two bays, and contains a round-arched cart entry with a keystone, a Venetian window above, and doorways to the sides. At the rear is a blocked cart entry and a lean-to extension.	II
Upper Lumb Farmhouse and Cottage; 53.69152°N 1.95468°W	—	Early to mid 17th century	The cottage was added to the house in the 18th century, and they are in painted stone with a stone slate roof. There are two storeys, the house has five bays, the cottage to the left has one bay, and there are two rear gabled wings. In the house is a doorway with a quoined and moulded surround, and an ogee head and a dated and initialled lintel. The windows in the house are mullioned, and in the cottage they have single lights.	II
Sowerby Hall; 53.70539°N 1.93777°W	—	1646	The house, later divided into three dwellings, is in stone on a chamfered plinth, with quoins and a stone slate roof, hipped at the rear, with coped gables and shaped finials. There are two storeys, two gabled wings, and a rear range. The porch has a coped gable, kneelers and a finial, and the doorway is arched and has a chamfered surround. The windows are mullioned, some also have transoms, and some have hood moulds.	II
Wood Lane Hall; 53.70928°N 1.93580°W		1649	The house, which incorporates earlier timber framing internally, is in stone on a chamfered plinth, and has a stone slate roof with coped gables, and a coped embattled parapet with merlons and finials. There are two storeys, and attic and a cellar, and a double-depth plan, and the house consists of a hall range with gabled cross-wings. In the angle between the hall range and the right wing is a two-storey porch with fluted jambs on plinths, imposts, and a lintel carved with a head, a date and initials. Over this is an architrave with fluted columns carrying an entablature with a frieze, a moulded cornice, and ball finials. Above this is a rose window with a hood mould, and a sundial. In the hall range is a large mullioned and double-transomed window, and elsewhere most of the windows are mullioned, many with decorative hood moulds, and in the right return are sash windows.	I
Wall and archway, Ball Green; 53.70405°N 1.94840°W		17th century	The walls and archway are in stone. There are two coped walls at right angles with quoins flanking the archway, which has a moulded surround with imposts, and voussoirs, and is surmounted by three ball finials, the middle one the largest.	II
Lower Breck Farmhouse and The Breck; 53.70015°N 1.93443°W	—	17th century	The house was altered in the 18th century and extended in the 19th century. It is in stone on a plinth, with quoins, and stone slate roofs with coped gables and shaped kneelers. It consists of a single-storey range flanked by two-storey projecting wings, and a later block in the angle at the rear. The central range has a coped parapet, and contains a doorway with a quoined moulded surround and a dated and initialled lintel. Some of the windows are mullioned, some are sashes, and some have hood moulds.	II
Sawter House Farmhouse; 53.69081°N 1.94250°W	—	.Mid 17th century (probable)	The farmhouse is in stone with quoins and a stone slate roof. There are two storeys, five bays, and a continuous rear outshut. Most of the windows are mullioned.	II
Spout Field Farmhouse; 53.69221°N 1.94635°W	—	17th century	The farmhouse, which was later altered, is in stone with a stone slate roof. There are two storeys and two bays. The doorway on the front has a quoined chamfered surround and a segmental-arched head, and at the rear are two doorways with pain surrounds. The windows are mullioned.	II
Spring Hill and barn 53.69427°N 1.96555°W	—	17th century	A laithe house, it is in stone with stone slate roofs and a finial on the left gable. The house has quoins, two storeys, two wide bays and outshuts on the front and rear. The house contains a doorway with a plain surround, and a porch with an arched doorway. The windows are mullioned and some have hood moulds. The barn has a central round-arched cart entry with a quoined surround and voussoirs, doorways and a window.	II
The Old Dene; 53.69038°N 1.93934°W	—	Mid 17th century (probable)	The rear of the house dates from the 18th century. The house is in stone with quoins, and a stone slate roof with a coped gable. There are two storeys, three main bays, and a linking bay on the south. On the courtyard front is a doorway with a chamfered quoined surround, in the south bay is a doorway with a plain surround, and the windows are mullioned. At the rear is a moulded cornice, a canted porch with a double door, and the windows are sashes.	II
52 and 54 Towngate, Sowerby; 53.70598°N 1.94096°W		1662	A stone house on a chamfered plinth with a stone slate roof. There are two storeys, three bays, and a rear wing with quoins and a coped gable with kneelers. The original doorway has a moulded surround, an ogee head and a lintel with a dated panel. To the left is a doorway with a plain surround, above which is a block carved with a shield and chevrons. The windows are mullioned with hood moulds, and in the ground floor on the front they are also transomed. In the angle at the rear is a porch.	II*
Delfs Farmhouse and barn 53.69426°N 1.97601°W	—	1672	The barn was added to the farmhouse in the early 18th century. The buildings are in stone with quoins, and stone slate roofs with coped gables. The house is rendered, and has two storeys and five bays. The central doorway has tiestones and a plain surround, to its left is a round-arched window with spandrels, and the other windows are mullioned. On the front of the house are two inscribed and dated plaques. The barn projects on the left, it has three bays and an outshut on the left. It contains a quoined cart entry with a monolithic lintel and doorways.	II
Bullace Trees Cottage; 53.70014°N 1.92820°W	—	Late 17th century	The house, which has been much altered, is in stone with a stone slate roof, and has two storeys and five bays. The doorway has a plain surround, in the left two bays the windows are sashes, and in the right three bays they are mullioned.	II
Church Terrace, Sowerby; 53.70655°N 1.93794°W	—	Late 17th century	A house, later subdivided, it is in stone with a stone slate roof. There are two storeys, and an L-shaped plan, with a range of three bays, and a wing projecting on the left. The doorways have plain surrounds, and the windows are mullioned.	II
Whitestone Clough Farmhouse; 53.69570°N 1.97318°W	—	Late 17th century	A stone farmhouse with a stone slate roof, it has two storeys and two bays. On the front are two later porches, and the windows are mullioned.	II
Barn adjoining Dean Farmhouse; 53.69010°N 1.93959°W	—	Early 18th century	A stone barn with quoins, a stone slate roof, and three bays. In the centre is a cart entry with monolithic corniced jambs, and a segmental arch with a keystone. Above it is a mullioned window, and to the right is a doorway. At the rear is an opposing cart entry with a quoined surround and a keystone, rectangular openings, doorways and round-arched vents, and in the gable end is an owl hole.	II
Long Royd; 53.69888°N 1.94767°W	—	Early 18th century	A range of cottages that were later altered and expanded. They are in stone with quoins, and stone slate roofs with a coped right gable and kneelers. There are two storeys, four bays, and an outshut at the north end. The openings have plain surrounds, the doorways, some of which are blocked, have plain surrounds, and the windows are mullioned and contain sashes.	II
Outhouse west of The Breck; 53.70011°N 1.93471°W	—	Early 18th century	The building is in stone with quoins and a stone slate roof. There are two storeys and one bay, and it contains two doorways, one blocked, and windows with plain surrounds.	II
The Hollins; 53.69694°N 1.93579°W	—	Early 18th century	The house was altered in the 19th century and has been divided into three. It is in stone with quoins, and a stone slate roof with coped gables. The west front has three bays, the right bay wider. The left two bays have three storeys and contain openings with plain surrounds. The right bay has two storeys and contains a Venetian window. At the rear is a porch with columns carrying a pediment and a blocking course, and the doorway has a plain surround and a fanlight. On this front is one mullioned window and the other windows are sashes.	II
Longfield House and Fairfield House; 53.70169°N 1.93660°W	—	Early to mid 18th century	A dower house and stables converted into two dwellings, forming an L-shaped plan, they are in stone with quoins, and stone slate roofs and coped gables. The house has a dentil cornice, two storeys and a symmetrical front of three bays. In the centre is a Tuscan porch with a modillion cornice and a blocking course, and the doorway has a rusticated surround and a fanlight. It is flanked by chamfered cross windows, and above the doorway is an oculus between mullioned windows. The stable range has three bays and openings with plain surrounds.	II
Field House; 53.70020°N 1.93858°W		1749	The house, which was extended in the 19th century, is in stone with a hipped stone slate roof, and is in Palladian style. There are two storeys and a basement, a front of eleven bays, and a short rear wing linking with a parallel kitchen range. The house has a rusticated basement, quoins, a floor band, modillion eaves, and a cornice. The middle three bays project under a pediment containing an elaborate coat of arms. Steps with a balustrade lead up to the central doorway that has a double architrave, a fanlight, pulvinated friezes, a cornice, and a segmental pediment. The right return has three bays, a pediment, and a central doorway with Tuscan columns, and an entablature with a blocking course and a lion. The windows on the front are sashes in architraves with corbelled cills, pulvinated friezes and cornices, and at the rear they are mullioned. On the kitchen range is a cupola with pinnacles on Doric columns.	II*
Orangery, Field House; 53.70082°N 1.93887°W	—	1749	The orangery is in stone with a glass roof, and has one storey and sides of five and two bays. In each bay is a tall round-arched window with imposts, and above is a cornice and the date over the middle bay. Internally the roof is carried on cast iron columns.	II
Porter's Lodge and 192 Rochdale Road, railings and gate piers 53.69982°N 1.92990°W		1749	A pair of lodges and a gateway to Field House. The lodges are in stone with hipped Welsh slate roofs. Each lodge has a single storey, and three bays, the middle bay projecting under a pediment containing an oculus and leaf scrolls. It is flanked by pilasters, and contains a doorway with an architrave, a fanlight and a dated frieze and cornice. The outer bays contain sash windows with architraves, and above them is a fluted frieze and a dentil cornice. The front facing the road has one bay and a pediment containing a crest and a motto. The gate piers are in stone with a square section, and each pier has a plinth with a moulded top, a shaft with a fluted band and festooned friezes, a moulded cornice, and an urn on a coved corniced fluted base, with swags and flame finial. The railings are in cast iron and link the gate piers to the lodges.	II
Gatepiers south of Field House; 53.69994°N 1.93890°W	—	Mid 18th century	The gate piers are in stone, and each pier has quoins, Ionic pilasters, a modillion cornice, and a ribbed urn supported by four iron brackets.	II
Stable range northeast of Field House; 53.70048°N 1.93849°W	—	Mid 18th century (probable)	The stable range is in stone with a stone slate roof and an L-shaped plan. There are two storeys, the main range has three bays, and there is a secondary range on the rear right. The main range has a plinth, and contains a doorway with a fanlight in a round-headed architrave, and is flanked by arched doorways, each with an oculus above. The openings have rusticated quoins and keystones, and to the right of the middle doorway is a mounting block. Elsewhere there are mullioned windows, some also with transoms. In the secondary range is a carriage arch with a keystone in each front.	II
Workshop and barn range, Field House; 53.70042°N 1.93889°W	—	Mid 18th century (probable)	The building, which incorporates earlier material and was later partly converted into cottages, is in stone with a stone slate roof. There are two storeys and a T-shaped plan, with two ranges each of eight bays. The workshop range contains an archway with a carved keystone, mullioned windows, transomed windows, an oriel window, slit vents, and doorways. The openings in the barn range include a segmental-arched cart entry with a quoined surround, and windows.	II
Haugh End Farmhouse; 53.70423°N 1.92174°W	—	18th century	The building, now used for other purposes, is in stone with a plinth band, quoins, and a stone slate roof with coped gables and shaped kneelers. There are two storeys, a basement at the left end, and eleven bays. The openings include a carriage doorway, a doorway with a bipartite lintel, a double door, and a blocked door, and the windows are mullioned.	II
Haugh End House; 53.70436°N 1.92115°W	—	Mid 18th century	The house and attached stables are in stone with stone slate roofs. The house has a plinth, sill bands, a modillion cornice, and a pediment. There are two storeys and an attic, a symmetrical front of five bays, and a nine-bay kitchen and stable range recessed and to the left. Steps lead up to the central doorway in an arched recess, with an architrave, a three-light fanlight, a pulvinated frieze, a cornice and a triangular pediment. The windows are sashes in architraves, with pulvinated friezes and either triangular or segmental pediments. The rear wing has quoins, a central elliptical arched carriage entrance with a keystone, pilasters, imposts and voussoirs. Above it is a Venetian window, a dentil cornice, a blind oval window, a dentil pediment, and a weathervane. The outer bays contain doorways, Venetian windows, and a mounting block.	II*
Minstrel Cottage and The George, Mill Bank; 53.68892°N 1.94699°W	—	Mid 18th century	A house later converted into two cottages. They are in stone with quoins and a stone slate roof. There are two storeys and four bays. The openings have plain surrounds, and the windows are mullioned.	II
Stansfield Bridge; 53.69557°N 1.93325°W		18th century	The bridge carries a road over the River Ryburn, and its parapet was rebuilt in the 19th century. The bridge is in stone and consists of two segmental arches. It has voussoirs, triangular cutwaters, a band, and a parapet with saddleback coping. At the ends are bollards with bands and hemispherical capstones.	II
St Peter's Church, Sowerby; 53.70524°N 1.93655°W		1761–66	The church was extended and restored in about 1880, it is built in millstone grit, and is in Classical style. The church consists of a nave, a north organ chamber and vestry, a chancel with an apse, and a west tower. The tower has three stages, with a Venetian window and a clock face in the west front, and a cornice and pinnacles at the top. Along the sides of the nave are two tiers of windows, square-headed above and round-arched below. Between the bays are attached Doric columns, and the parapet contains blind balustrading.	I
Wall, gates and gate piers, St Peter's Church; 53.70532°N 1.93726°W	—	c. 1766	The wall enclosing the churchyard is in millstone grit with chamfered coping. There are three pairs of gate piers in stone that have cornices and pyramidal caps. The gates are in cast iron.	II
84 Dob Lane, Sowerby; 53.70620°N 1.94310°W	—	Mid to late 18th century	A stone house with quoins, plain gutter brackets, and a stone slate roof. There are two storeys and two bays. The doorway and windows, which are mullioned, have plain surrounds.	II
Lea family tomb 53.70565°N 1.93613°W	—	Mid to late 18th century	The tomb is in the churchyard of St Peter's Church, it is in stone, and has a moulded plinth, and a dentil cornice. There are balusters at the ends and in the centres of the long sides, and oval panels in architraves on all sides. The top slab is finely lettered.	II
White Windows, Sowerby; 53.70584°N 1.92073°W		1768	The house, designed by John Carr and probably incorporating earlier material, is in stone on a plinth, with a rusticated basement, rusticated quoins rising to panelled pilasters, a band, moulded cornices, and a hipped stone slate roof with a balustrade. There are two storeys, a basement and an attic, a symmetrical front of seven bays, two rear wings, and a wing on the left at the rear. In the centre of the front, double flights of steps with handrails lead up to a doorway with an architrave, a fanlight, a pulvinated frieze, a cornice and a swan-neck pediment. In the basement are fixed six-pane windows, the two main floors contain sash windows, and in the attic the windows are casements, all with moulded architraves. At the rear is a Venetian window.	II
80 and 82 Dob Lane, Sowerby; 53.70618°N 1.94299°W		Late 18th century	A pair of stone houses with quoins, chamfered gutter brackets, and a stone slate roof. There are three storeys, and each house has one bay, a doorway and windows with plain surrounds, the windows being mullioned.	II
Dob Cottage, Sowerby; 53.70703°N 1.94494°W	—	Late 18th century	The cottage is in stone, and has a stone slate roof with pantiles at the front. There are two storeys with a basement at the rear, one bay, and a single-storey wing. The openings have plain surrounds, and the windows are mullioned.	II
Little London House; 53.69490°N 1.96595°W	—	Late 18th century	A pair of houses combined into one, it is in millstone grit with quoins, and a stone slate roof. There are two storeys and two bays. On the front are gabled porches and doorways with plain surrounds and tiestones. The windows are mullioned.	II
Stump Cottage, Sowerby; 53.70622°N 1.94318°W	—	Late 18th century	The cottage is in stone with quoins and has a stone slate roof with a kneeler on the left. There are two storeys and one bay. The doorway has a plain surround and tiestones, and there is a two-light mullioned window in each floor.	II
The Triangle; 53.69483°N 1.93579°W		Late 18th century	The public house is in stone with quoins and a stone slate roof. There are three storeys and an attic, and sides of five and two bays. On the front the openings have plain surrounds, and consist of two doorways, a taking-in door, and mullioned windows. On the gable end are two Venetian windows with keystones in each floor, and in the attic is a Diocletian window with a keystone. On the wall is a memorial to the First World War.	II
Brockwell House and Cottage; 53.70229°N 1.92697°W	—	c. 1800 (probable)	The house, which was later divided into two dwellings, is in stone on a plinth, with quoins, sill bands, a dentilled moulded cornice, and a stone slate roof. The main block has two storeys and three bays, and to the left is a recessed wing with three storeys and a basement, one bay, and an added bay at the rear. The central doorway has an architrave, a fanlight, a pulvinated frieze, and a cornice, and above it is a dated and initialled plaque. The doorway is flanked by bow windows, there are stair windows at the rear and in the wing, and the other windows are sashes.	II
Smith family tomb 53.70555°N 1.93627°W	—	c. 1800	The tomb is in the churchyard of St Peter's Church, it is in stone, and has a tooled base. On the top slab is lettering in a sunk border, with trumpeting angles flanking a book in the top corners, and fans flanking a flower in the bottom corners.	II
Barn east of Upper Lumb Farmhouse; 53.69149°N 1.95398°W	—	c. 1800	The barn is in stone with a stone slate roof and four bays, the two bays on the right projecting to the front and the back as outshuts. On the front is a segmental-arched cart entry with tiestones, a mullioned window above, and doorways. At the rear is an opposing cart entry, and in the gable end is an owl hole.	II
Dean Farmhouse; 53.69028°N 1.93958°W	—	Late 18th to early 19th century	A barn and cottages combined into a house, it is in stone with a stone slate roof. There are two storeys and four bays, and in the left bay is a segmental-arched cart entry with tiestones. The openings have plain surrounds, and the windows are casements.	II
Otter Lee; 53.69408°N 1.95636°W	—	Late 18th to early 19th century	A house and barn combined into one house, it is in stone with quoins and a stone slate roof. The house has two storeys, two bays, a porch, and mullioned windows. The former barn contains a central round-arched cart entry with a quoined surround, imposts, and a keystone, windows and a doorway.	II
Pollard family tomb 53.70562°N 1.93640°W	—	c. 1806	The tomb is in the churchyard of St Peter's Church, it is in stone, and has a base with fielded panels flanked by fluted pilasters. The top slab has a corniced edge and a border with foliage in relief, a cherub at top, and a winged skull at the base.	II
Thorpe Mill; 53.68981°N 1.93357°W	—	1824	The former mill, later used for other purposes, is in stone with a stone slate roof. There are three storeys and an attic, and nine bays. In the centre of the west front is a segmental-arched cart entry converted into a window that has a rusticated surround, imposts and a cornice. At the rear is a clock face above the cart entry. Above the cart entries are tripartite windows, in the right bays are sash windows, and elsewhere on the front are fixed or 20th-century windows. In the gable ends are Venetian windows.	II
Dean Mews; 53.69040°N 1.93941°W	—	Early 19th century	A former carriage house, cottage and, at right angles, a courtyard entrance, forming an L-shaped plan and converted for residential use. It is in stone with stone slate roofs. and has two storeys. The cottage and carriage house have openings with plain surrounds, casement windows, and a segmental arch with a keystone. The courtyard entrance has a tall segmental arch and a window, and at the rear there are rusticated pilasters, imposts, and voussoirs.	II
Coach House and Stable, Thorpe House; 53.68965°N 1.93360°W	—	Early 19th century	The coach house and stable are in stone on a plinth, with bands and stone slate roofs with coped gables. They have two storeys, and form three ranges round a courtyard, open to the north. The east range has three bays, and contains a segmental-arched cart entry with rusticated quoins, imposts, and a tripartite keystone, and is flanked by blind arched recesses with lunettes. The south range has one bay and an elliptical-arched cart entry, and the west range has two cart entries similar to the east range, and a doorway with a fanlight and a keystone.	II
Milepost at 04412182; 53.69290°N 1.93468°W		Early 19th century	The milepost is on the east side of Rochdale Road (A58 road). It is in stone with a triangular section and a ramped top. On the sides are inscribed the distances to Rochdale and to Halifax, West Yorkshire.	II
The Glebe House; 53.69770°N 1.93862°W	—	Early 19th century	A vicarage, later a private house, it is in stone with a stone slate roof and a shaped kneeler on the left. There are two storeys and three bays, and a bay added to the left. Steps lead up to the doorway that has a quoined and double-chamfered surround and a double-cusped lintel. This is flanked by mullioned windows with arched lights and sunk spandrels. The windows in the upper floor are mullioned.	II
Bluebell Lodge, Mill Bank; 53.68743°N 1.94840°W		Early to mid 19th century	A mill building, later a private house, it is in stone with quoins, floor bands, and a stone slate roof with coped gables and shaped kneelers. Part of the house has two storeys, and attic and a basement, and three bays, and the other part has three storeys and one bay. The openings have plain surrounds, and the windows are mullioned. Some windows also have transoms, the window above the doorway has an architrave, and in the gable end is a Venetian window with a keystone.	II
Brock Well Gate; 53.70331°N 1.92324°W		Early to mid 19th century	A terrace of three stone houses with quoins and a stone slate roof. There are three storeys, and each house has one bay. The openings have plain surrounds, and each house has a doorway and an inserted garage door in the ground floor, and a two-light and a stepped three-light mullioned window in both the upper floors. The right return contains a blocked taking-in door.	II
Dean House; 53.69027°N 1.93924°W	—	Early to mid 19th century	The house is in stone with sill bands, a moulded eaves cornice, and a hipped stone slate roof. There are two storeys and fronts of three and five bays. Steps lead up to a central doorway with a fanlight, flanked by Tuscan pilasters, with an entablature and a segmental pediment, and the windows are sashes.	II
Fiddle Wood Cottage and cottage to south 53.68770°N 1.94801°W	—	Early to mid 19th century	A pair of stone houses with a stone slate roof. There are two storeys, the left house also has a basement, and each house has two bays. The openings have plain surrounds, and the windows are mullioned with casements.	II
Outbuilding northeast of Lower Beck Farmhouse; 53.70023°N 1.93416°W	—	Early to mid 19th century	The outbuilding is in stone and has a hipped corrugated asbestos roof. There are two storeys and five bays. The outbuilding contains an elliptical-arched cart entry with a fanlight and a keystone, a doorway, and a stable door with a window.	II
Former mill building, Mill House Estate; 53.70027°N 1.92532°W	—	Early to mid 19th century	The former mill building is in stone with a hipped stone slate roof. There is one storey and three bays. The entrance front contains a round-arched double door, this is flanked by lunettes with keystones, and there are more lunettes along the sides.	II
Unit One, Mill House Estate; 53.70018°N 1.92540°W	—	Early to mid 19th century	A former dye and acid stores, it is in stone with a stone slate roof. There is a single storey facing the road, three storeys at the rear, and 16 bays. It contains small windows, two wide doorways, and a loading door.	II
Block adjoining Unit One, Mill House Estate; 53.69981°N 1.92607°W	—	Early to mid 19th century	A mill building later used for other purposes. It is in stone with a sheet metal roof, three storeys, a part-basement, and 13 bays. The windows have six panes, plain surrounds, stone lintels, and projecting sills. Some windows are blocked and there are various doorways.	II
Unit 5, Mill House Estate; 53.69975°N 1.92650°W	—	Early to mid 19th century	The former mill building is in stone and has a corrugated iron roof. There are four storeys and three bays. The openings have plain surrounds, and consist of mullioned windows, and doorways, some of which are blocked. In the middle floor is a blocked rectangular opening with a dressed surround.	II
Unit 30, Mill House Estate; 53.69925°N 1.92815°W	—	Early to mid 19th century	The former mill building, probably a warehouse, is in stone with a stone slate roof. There are two storeys and an attic, a front of eleven bays, and four-bay returns. Above three of the bays on the front is a gable containing a hoist. The openings have plain surrounds, and consist of doorways, loading doors on the front under the gable, and six-pane windows. In the returns are Venetian windows with keystones in the gables.	II
Thimble Nook Cottage, Mill Bank; 53.68712°N 1.94877°W	—	Early to mid 19th century	A stone house with a stone slate roof, it has two storeys and three bays. The openings have plain surrounds, and the windows are mullioned.	II
St Mary's Church, Cottonstones; 53.69142°N 1.95789°W		1845–46	The church is built in stone, it has a stone slate roof, and is in Early English style. It consists of a nave, a chancel with a three-sided apse and extensions to the north and south, and a west steeple. The steeple has a three-stage tower with angle buttresses, a west door, a corbel table, and a broach spire with a finial. The windows along the nave are lancets, and at each corner of the nave is a pinnacle.	II
Gate piers to back yard, Field House; 53.70060°N 1.93810°W	—	Mid 19th century (probable)	The gate piers are in stone, and each has a plinth with a lion's head on each side, a panelled shaft with oriental motifs, a shaped corniced pedestal, and a decorated block with entwined snakes. On the top is a finial on a shaped base.	II
Mill Chimney; 53.70068°N 1.92741°W		Mid 19th century	The chimney is in stone, it is about 15 metres (49 ft) high, and has a square base with a band. The shaft is chamfered and rises to become octagonal. At the top it has been repaired in brick and has iron banding.	II
Caretaker's Cottage, Mill House Estate; 53.70024°N 1.92541°W	—	Mid 19th century	The cottage is in stone with a stone slate roof. There are two storeys and two bays. The openings have plain surrounds, and the windows are sashes.	II
Unit 10, Mill House Estate; 53.69945°N 1.92638°W	—	Mid 19th century	An industrial building in stone with a modillion cornice, built over the River Ryburn. There are four storeys and sides of nine and five bays. In the north front is a rusticated panel with a cornice containing a doorway with a fanlight and a wagon entrance with a segmental arch, both with keystones. Elsewhere there are windows, some of which are sashes, and in the left return are blocked doorways.	II
Units 17 and 18, Mill House Estate; 53.69994°N 1.92637°W	—	Mid 19th century	A former mill building, later used for other purposes, it is in stone with a modillion cornice and a hipped stone slate roof, There are thee storeys and ten bays. The fourth bay is a loading bay and has a coped gable containing a hoist. Elsewhere are six-pane windows, a doorway, and an inserted garage door.	II
Block northwest of Units 17 and 18, Mill House Estate; 53.70005°N 1.92618°W	—	Mid 19th century	A mill building, probably an office, it is in stone with a moulded cornice and a blocking course. There are two storeys and five bays. The openings have chamfered surrounds, the windows were sashes, and in the centre, steps lead up to a doorway with a three-pane fanlight.	II
Well northwest of Porter Lodge; 53.69990°N 1.93004°W	—	19th century (probable)	The well is in stone and consists of a trough in an arched niche with incised voussoirs, a dated keystone, a pulvinated frieze, and a moulded cornice.	II
Saw Hill Farmhouse, 2 Saw Hill and outbuildings 53.69053°N 1.93720°W	—	Mid 19th century	This consists of two cottages, a barn and a cowhouse. It is in stone and has a Welsh slate roof with coped gables, kneelers and a finial. There is a T-shaped plan and two storeys. The south front has three bays forming the outhouses, and a four-bay cross-wing on the right containing the cottages. The middle bay of the outhouse projects, it is gabled, and contains a cart entry with a pointed head, a hood mould, and lancet vents. The outer bays contain segmental-headed doorways, mullioned windows, and vents. The cross-wing is on a plinth, and the windows are sashes in chamfered quoined surround with hood moulds.	II
Ogden Farmhouse with barn 53.69619°N 1.95176°W	—	1856	A laithe house in stone with a stone slate roof. The house has two storeys and one bay, and the openings have plain surrounds. The barn to the right has quoins and three bays. It contains a central round-arched cart entry with a quoined surround and a dated keystone, above it is a Venetian window, and to the sides are doorways, windows, and slit vents.	II
Barn attached to Whitestone Clough; 53.69562°N 1.97331°W		1856	A stone barn with a stone slate roof, three bays, and an outshut on the left. In the centre is a round-arched cart entry with tiestones, imposts, and a keystone. To the sides are doorways with tiestones, above is a round-arched window with a dated sill, flanked by lunettes. At the rear are quoins, and a blocked threshing door with an inserted window.	II
Fountain northeast of Field House; 53.70038°N 1.93804°W	—	Mid to late 19th century	The fountain is in the garden of the house, and consists of a circular stone basin on a plinth, and has a wall with a moulded rim, and four buttresses with lions' heads. The fountain is in cast iron on a concrete base, and has a shaft of clustered columns carrying a petalled bowl, with central stem supporting a smaller bowl with a fountain nozzle.	II
Former Methodist Chapel, Mill Bank; 53.68930°N 1.94734°W		Mid to late 19th century	The former chapel is in stone on a plinth, it has a Welsh slate roof, a front of three bays, and sides of four bays. The entrance front has angle pilasters that rise and have pyramidal caps, bands, and machicolated eaves. The middle bay projects slightly, and contains a portal that has a double door with a fanlight, and this is flanked by corniced pilasters. The windows are round-arched sashes with archivolts, imposts, relieving arches, and projecting cills. In the centre of the gable is a belfry with a cornice.	II
Gate piers and gates east of Field House; 53.70022°N 1.93751°W	—	c. 1874 (probable)	The gate piers are in stone with a square section, and each pier is on a plinth with a moulded top, and has a shaft with a fluted band and a festooned frieze on each face, a moulded cornice, an urn on a coved corniced fluted base with swags, and a flame finial. The gates are in cast iron.	II

== See also ==
- Listed buildings in Sowerby Bridge
