= Friendly, West Yorkshire =

Coordinates: 53°42′52″N 1°55′18″W

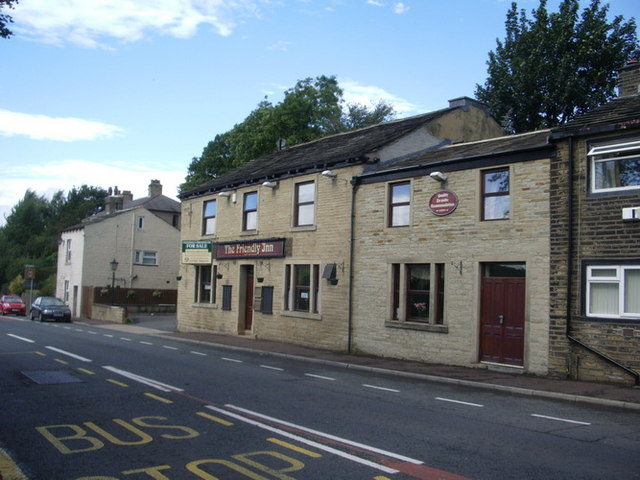
The Friendly Inn, seen in 2009 and since renamed The Copper Cow

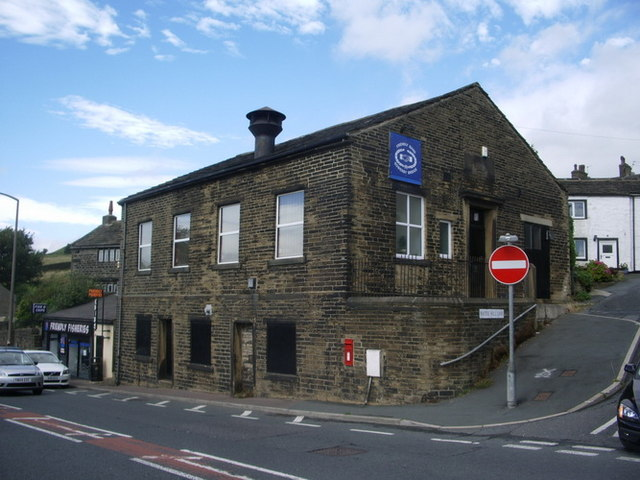
The Friendly Band's headquarters

Friendly is a settlement near Sowerby Bridge in Calderdale, West Yorkshire, England, lying on the A646 road in the valley of the River Calder. It was described in John Bartholomew's 1887 Gazetteer of the British Isles as a village 3 miles west of Halifax.

It is the home of The Friendly Band, a brass band founded in 1868. The former village pub, the White Horse, has closed. The Friendly Inn on Burnley Road has been renamed The Copper Cow.

== Government ==
The settlement straddles the boundaries of the Sowerby Bridge, Warley and Luddenden wards of the Metropolitan borough of Calderdale, part of the Metropolitan county of West Yorkshire.

== See also ==
- Listed buildings in Sowerby Bridge
