= Cardinal Newman Roman Catholic School, Rhydyfelin =

Coordinates: 51.585°N 3.304°W

Cardinal Newman RC School
- The School Logo
- Pontypridd, Wales; Rhydyfelin, Rhondda Cynon Taf

Information
- Type: Comprehensive School
- Religious affiliation: Roman Catholic
- Established: 1967
- Head teacher: Justin O’Sullivan
- Website: http://cardinalnewman.co.uk/

Cardinal Newman Roman Catholic Comprehensive School (Welsh: Ysgol Gyfun Gatholig Cardinal Newman) is an English speaking Roman Catholic comprehensive school in the village of Rhydyfelin near Pontypridd, in Rhondda Cynon Taf, Wales, United Kingdom. The school motto is, "O Galon i Galon," Welsh for "Heart to Heart," and it is based on Saint John Henry Newman's motto.

== Buildings ==
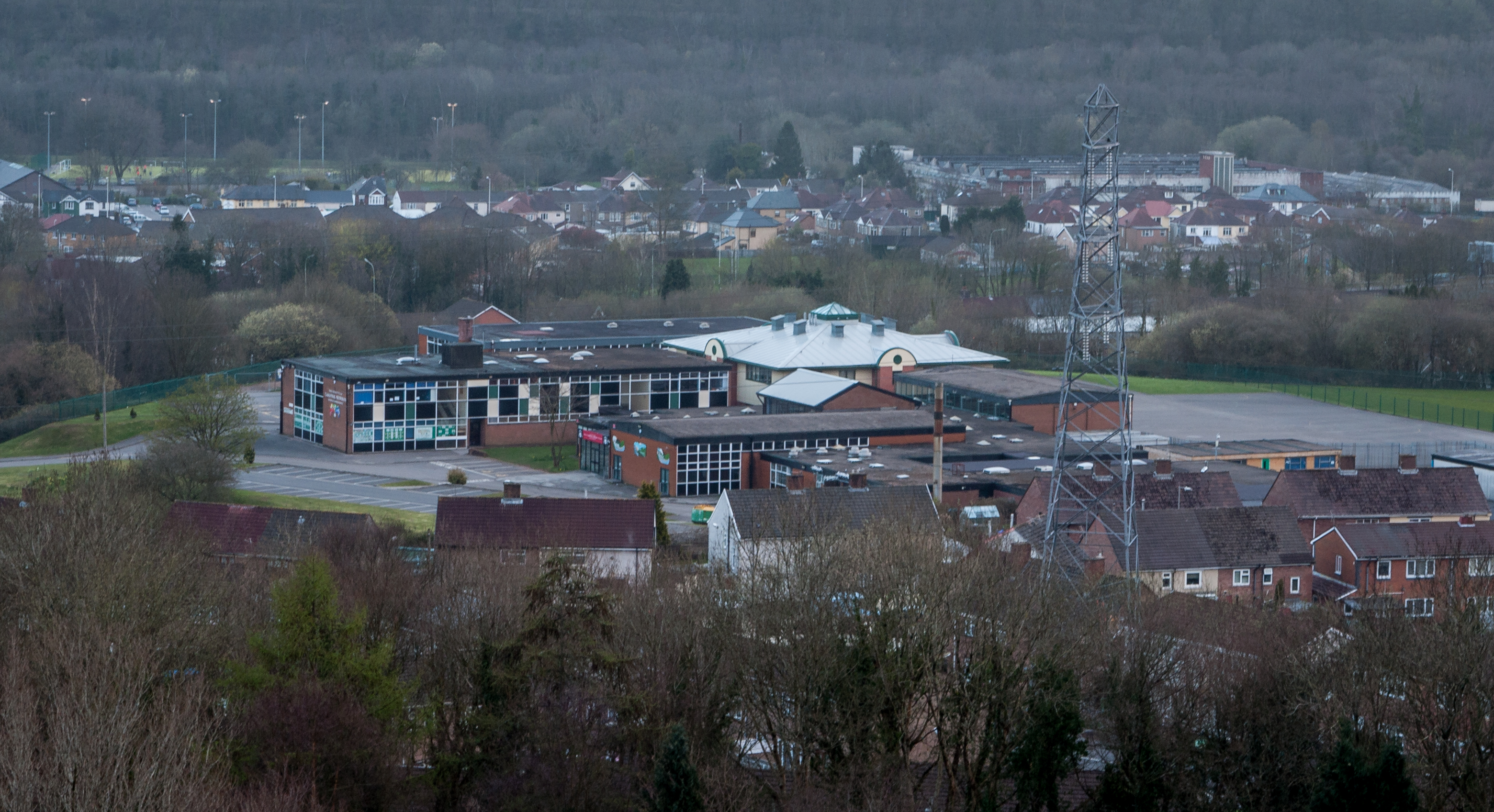
The Cardinal Newman Roman Catholic School.

The school consists of 4 main buildings:

- Main Building: Reception area, Assembly Hall, Canteen, Gymnasium, Library, Staff Room, Physical Education Classrooms, Technology Department, Media Classrooms, Changing rooms and History Department.
- Double Storey Block: Upstairs - English, Geography. Downstairs - French, Art, Catering and Hospitality.
- Science Building: Physics, Biology, Chemistry, Conference Room, Religious Education.
- RE Block: Downstairs - Religious Education, Welsh, Café Area. Upstairs - ICT, Maths, Welsh Baccalaureate Area.

There is also an area with terrapins for instrument study, support staff offices, inclusion and nurture.

== History ==
The school is named after Saint John Henry Newman (who was canonised on 13 October 2019). The school was opened in 1967 (officially opened 1969).

== Partnerships with the school ==
The school's previous consortium, which consisted of Pontypridd High School, Hawthorn High School and Cardinal Newman RC School, was dissolved after the end of the 2012-13 school year. It was replaced by a different consortium with the inclusion on a new college in Nantgarw, Cardiff which is located 2.2 miles away. This consortium consists of Cardinal Newman RC School, Coleg Morgannwg (later Coleg Y Cymoedd) and St David's Catholic College. This consortium ended following the 2017-2018 school year. It has been announced that a new partnership with St David’s Catholic College will begin after the sixth form's last intake in September 2021 due to it being the only R.C post 16 option available to learners after the sixth form ceases to operate.

The school has a partnership with a Ugandan school named Bukalasi. They have a few fundraising events to raise money for the school to help them build new buildings. The money is raised and send to the school via CAFOD. Teachers from each of the schools visit the other school around once per year.

== Alumni ==
- Robert Earnshaw (b. 1981) - footballer, West Bromwich Albion F.C., Wales national football team
- Fionn McLoughlin (b. 1982) - Irish Rugby Union Player, ex Shannon RUFC, Pontypridd RUFC currently with Royal Tunbridge Wells RUFC.
- Tommy O'Sullivan (b. 1995) - footballer, Cardiff City F.C.
- Phil Campbell (musician) (7 May 1961 – 13 March 2026).
