= Rhydyfelin =

Coordinates: 51.586660°N 3.305103°W

Rhydyfelin: Welsh: Rhydfelen
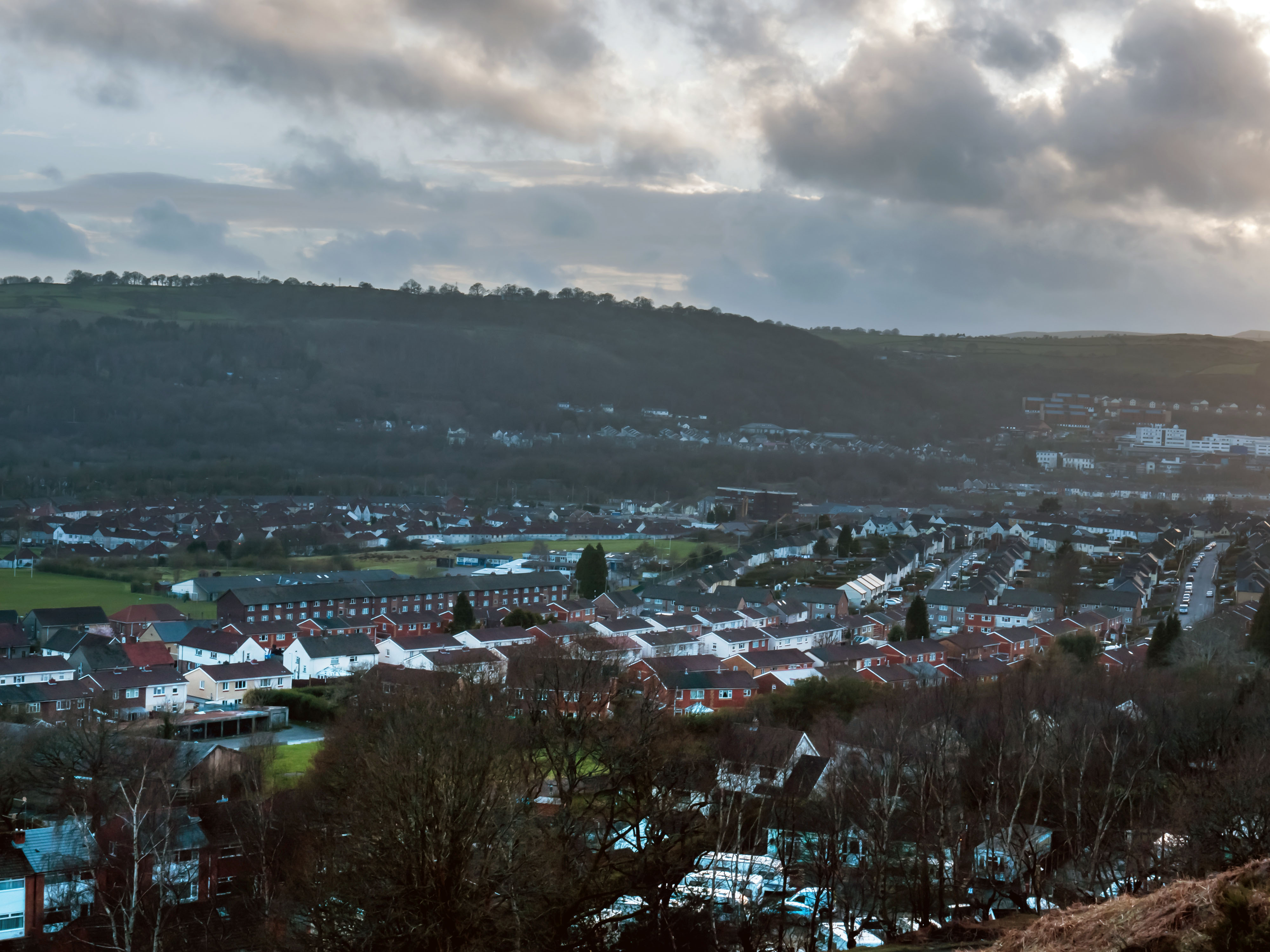
- Rhydyfelin viewed from the hill below Eglwysilan

- Location within Rhondda Cynon Taf
- Population: 4,505 (2011 ward)
- OS grid reference: ST093885
- Community: Pontypridd Town
- Principal area: Rhondda Cynon Taf
- Preserved county: Mid Glamorgan
- Country: Wales
- Sovereign state: United Kingdom
- Post town: PONTYPRIDD
- Postcode district: CF37
- Dialling code: 01443
- Police: South Wales
- Fire: South Wales
- Ambulance: Welsh
- UK Parliament: Pontypridd
- Senedd Cymru – Welsh Parliament: Pontypridd, South Wales Central Electoral Region

Rhydyfelin (Welsh pronunciation: [r̥idəˈvɛlɪn]) is a large village (originally known as Rhydfelen) and part of the community of Pontypridd Town, about 2 miles (3.2 km) to its south east of Pontypridd, in the county borough of Rhondda Cynon Taf. It is on the eastern bank of the River Taff, close to the A470, and historically was in the parish of Eglwysilan.

== History ==
Rhydyfelin is also known as Rhydfelen, and means Mill ford in the Welsh language. It grew from a rural hamlet to a thriving village in the 19th century, due to its location on the Glamorganshire Canal which took iron from Merthyr Tydfil to the city of Cardiff, and linking to this Dr Richard Griffiths' canal and tramway which took coal from the Rhondda Valleys. Also of note was the nearby Iron and Tin works at Treforest. Other minor works included an ironworks on the site of the tram shed buildings.

Neighbouring villages are Hawthorn, Treforest and Glyntaff. The village is split into two electoral wards: the lower, largely historic part of the village is in Hawthorn Ward along with the settlement of Upper Boat, which comprises some of the nearby Treforest Estate, while the largely social housing of the estates of upper Rhydyfelin are in the ward of Rhydyfelen Central and Ilan.

The original name was Rhydfelen, and the version "Rhydyfelin" is believed to be a corruption.

Rhydyfelin was once served by two railway stations: one on the Cardiff Railway, and one on the Pontypridd, Caerphilly and Newport Railway. After the Grouping, the former Cardiff Railway halt became Rhydyfelin Low Level Halt and the halt of the Pontypridd, Caerphilly and Newport Railway became Rhydyfelin High Level Halt. The halts closed in 1931 and 1953 respectively.

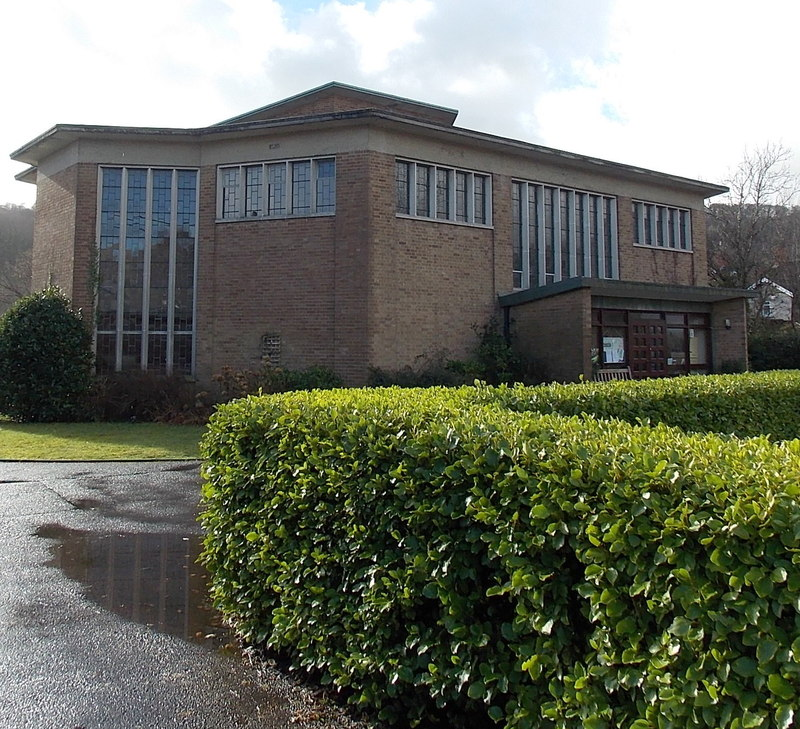
St Luke's Church

The Church of St Luke is in the Church in Wales Parish of Rhydyfelin, Diocese of Llandaff.

== Population ==
The populations of the Central Rhydyfelin ward and Hawthorn wards, which together serve Rhydyfelin, were 4,672 and 3,652 respectively (8,324 in total) in the 2001 Census (the 2009 electorates were 3,084 and 2,781, respectively) out of the total 33,000 residents for Pontypridd as a whole.

== Governance ==
Rhydfelen was the name of the electoral ward to Mid Glamorgan County Council between 1989 and 1996. Until 1996 Rhydfelen Central and Rhydfelen Lower were wards to Taff-Ely Borough Council.

It is now split between the electoral wards of Hawthorn and of central Rhydfelen, with the more prosperous and historic lower Rhydyfelin falling within the Hawthorn ward to the south.

== Notable residents ==
Rhydyfelin was home to guitarist Lee Gaze of the former rock band Lostprophets and current band No Devotion. It is also the home of Joseph Biddulph, linguist, publisher and historian.

== Places of interest ==
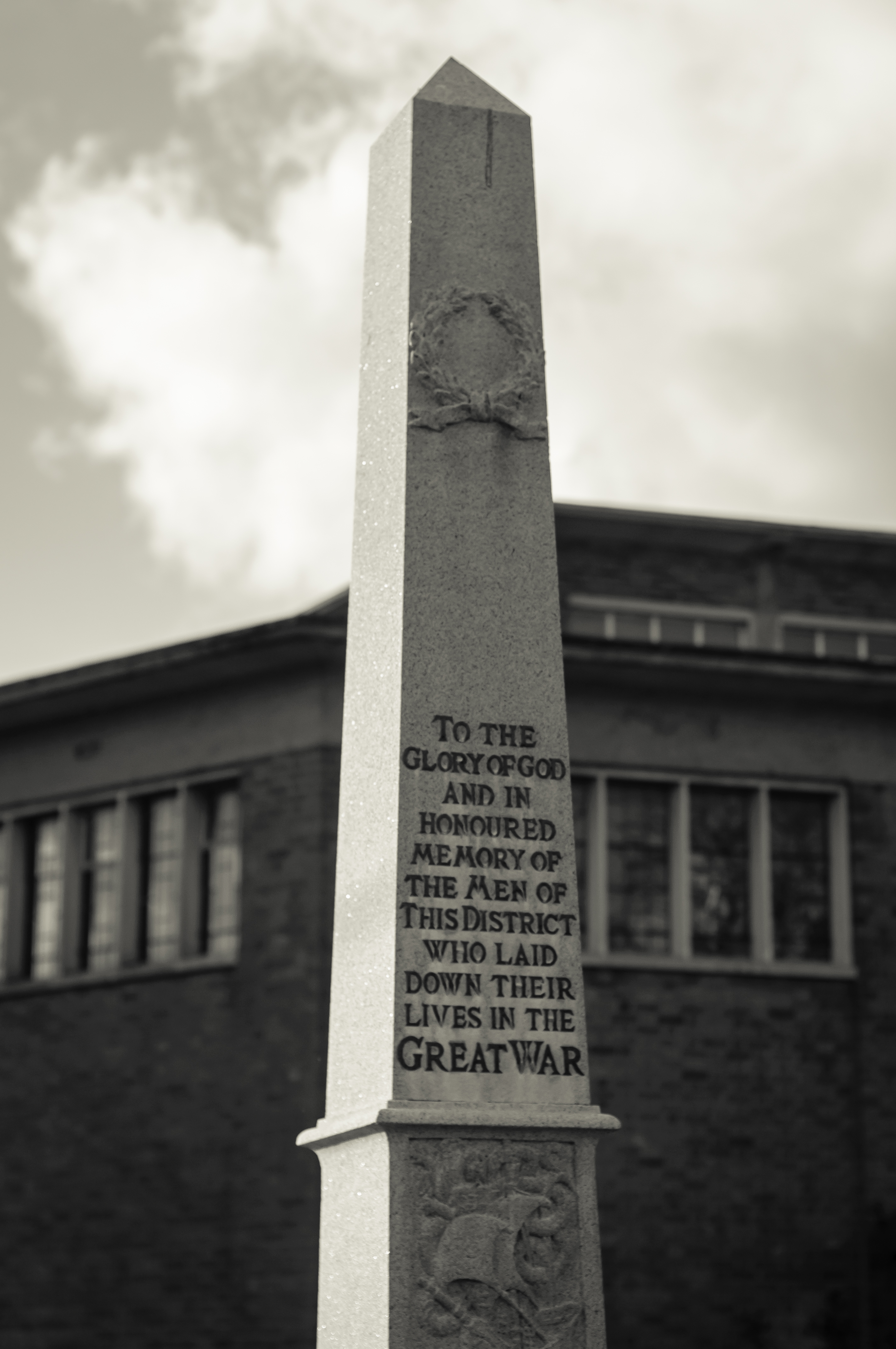
Rhydyfelin's war memorial is a Grade II listed building

The village is on the 55-mile (89 km) Taff Trail from Brecon to Cardiff Bay. The view from lower Rhydyfelin of Eglwysilan mountain shows the locally known 'Monkeys Tump'.

== Education ==
The first Welsh language secondary school in South Wales, Ysgol Gyfun Rhydfelen, was established at Rhydyfelin in 1962. It closed in 2006 when it was relocated to Church Village and renamed Garth Olwg.

Schools in Rhydyfelin include Cardinal Newman RC School (Roman Catholic), Hawthorn High School (English medium), Heol-Y-Celyn Primary School (Welsh and English medium). It is the former home of Coleg Morgannwg (English medium further education college) and Glantâf infants school (English medium).
