= Baitings Reservoir =

Reservoir in West Yorkshire, England

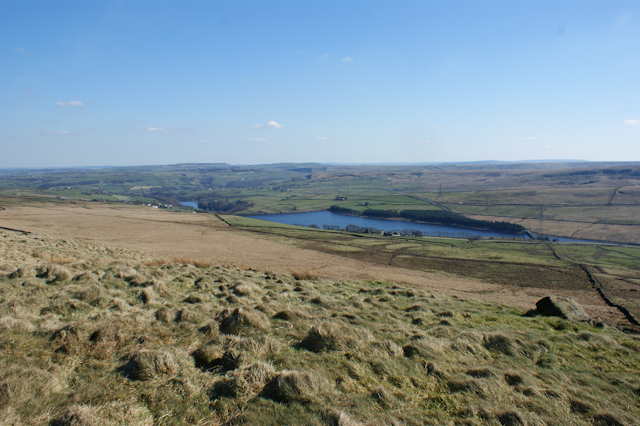
- View from Great Manshead Hill

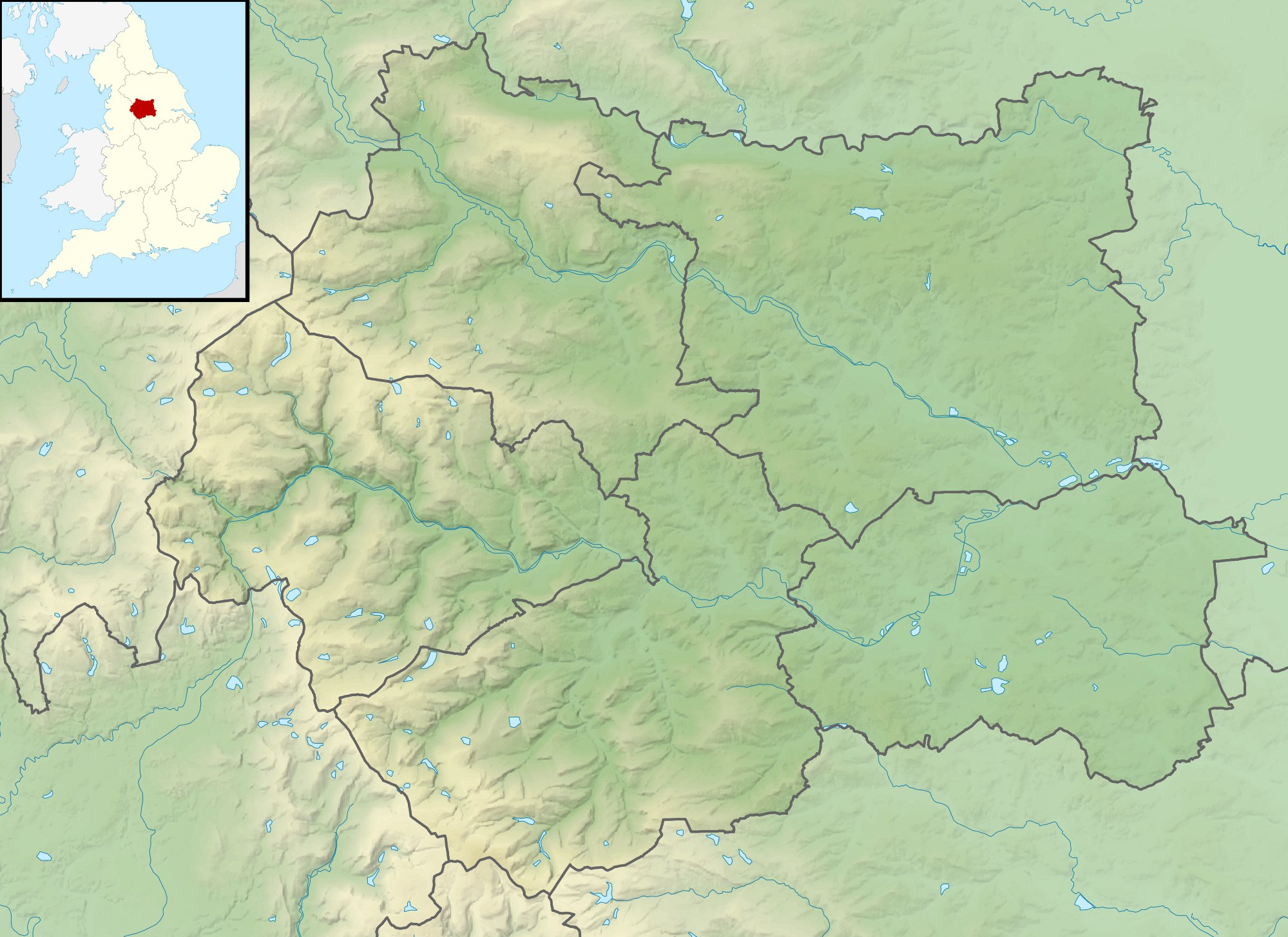
- Location within West Yorkshire
- Location: West Yorkshire
- Coordinates: 53°39′57″N 1°59′25″W
- Type: Reservoir
- Primary outflows: River Ryburn
- Basin countries: United Kingdom
- Built: 1956
- Max. length: 3,250 feet (990 m)
- Max. width: 1,035 feet (315 m)

Baitings Reservoir is a large water supply reservoir operated by Yorkshire Water close to Ripponden in the West Yorkshire Pennines, England. It lies in the valley of the River Ryburn, is the higher of two reservoirs built to supply Wakefield with water and was completed in 1956. The lower reservoir is Ryburn Reservoir.

== History ==
Wakefield Corporation Waterworks started impounding the valley of the River Ryburn in the 1930s, with Ryburn Reservoir being completed in 1933. Construction on Baitings took place 20 years later with completion in 1956. Baitings is a place name that derives from the Old Norse of Beit (pasture) and Eng (meadow), Baitings Bridge, on an old road linking Yorkshire and Lancashire, was to be flooded under the reservoir so a concrete viaduct was built. During spells of very hot weather and drought conditions, the old road bridge is revealed.

The dam head is a curved structure that is 1,540 feet (470 m) long and over 160 feet (50 m) high. The reservoir covers 59 acres (24 hectares) and has a catchment of 1,830 acres (742 hectares), and when it is full, it holds over 113,000,000 cubic feet (3,190,000 m^{3}) of water. The dam took eight years to complete at a cost of £1.4 million, and is located at 840 feet (256 m) above sea level. A tunnel connects reservoirs in valleys to the north with Baitings to allow for the transfer of water. Manshead Tunnel is 8,000 feet (2,400 m) long and was opened in 1962.

In 1989, the body of a man was found at the bottom of the reservoir during a period of dry weather, when the water was 40 feet (12 m) shallower than normal. He had been murdered and his body was weighted down with a pick axe. The crime was featured on Crimewatch and remains unsolved.
