= Listed buildings in Sowerby Bridge =

Sowerby Bridge is a market town and a ward to the southwest of Halifax in the metropolitan borough of Calderdale, West Yorkshire, England. It contains 67 listed buildings that are recorded in the National Heritage List for England. Of these, three are at Grade II*, the middle of the three grades, and the others are at Grade II, the lowest grade. The ward contains the town of Sowerby Bridge, the smaller settlement of Friendly, and the surrounding area. Industries developed in the area from the later 18th century following the building of the Calder and Hebble Navigation and the Rochdale Canal. Most of the industrial buildings have gone, but some mills remain that have been converted for other uses and are listed. In addition to the canals, the River Calder and the River Ryburn run through the area, and the listed buildings associated with these waterways are bridges, locks, warehouses, and other structures. The other listed buildings include houses and associated structures, road and railway bridges, shops, civic buildings, churches and associated structures, a former Sunday school, farmhouses and farm buildings, a milepost, a milestone, public houses and hotels, and a folly in the form of a tower.

== Key ==
Grade	Criteria
II*	Particularly important buildings of more than special interest
II	Buildings of national importance and special interest

== Buildings ==
Name and location	Photograph	Date	Notes	Grade
The Hollins; 53.71155°N 1.91510°W	—	Late medieval	The house has a timber framed core, and has been encased in stone, altered and extended over the centuries, and subdivided. It has a stone slate roof, hipped on the left, two storeys, and consists of a hall range with a wing projecting forward on the right, and a cross-wing projecting to the rear on the left. The doors and windows date from the 19th century and have plain surrounds, two of the doorways with cornices.	II
County Bridge; 53.70820°N 1.91207°W		1517	The bridge carries the A58 road over the River Calder. It was widened in 1632, and again in 1875 when iron superstructure was added. It consists of three stone round arches with round piers and triangular cutwaters. The superstructure has a latticed base, and a balustrade with round-ended panels, and panelled standards with pyramidal finials.	II
42, 44 and 46 Wharf Street; 53.70937°N 1.90751°W	—	16th century	A row of three shops with a timber framed core, later encased in stone. They have a stone slate roof, two storeys on the front and three storeys at the rear, and each shop has one bay. In the ground floor are shop fronts, and the upper floor contains mullioned windows with sashes.	II
Willow Hall; 53.71884°N 1.90137°W	—	1610	A stone house with a stone roof, it has two storeys, and consists of a main range with gabled cross-wings, and single-storey extensions. There is a gable in the centre of the main range, and in the angle with the west wing is a two-storey gabled porch. The windows on the front are mullioned with arched lights and sunk spandrels. The rear was remodelled in the 18th century, and contains sash windows and two Venetian windows.	II
Blackwall Farmhouse; 53.71431°N 1.91622°W	—	Early 17th century (probable)	The farmhouse has been altered and divided, and is in stone with a stone slate roof. There are two storeys and three bays, consisting of a hall, and a cross-wing to the left with a hipped roof and a crocketed finial. On the front is a segmental-arched doorway, at the rear is a gabled porch with a chamfered surround and a Tudor arch, inside are stone benches and an internal doorway with a segmental arch, and there are later inserted doorways. The windows are mullioned or transomed, and some have hood moulds.	II
Hoyle House; 53.71587°N 1.92055°W		Early 17th century	A farmhouse that was extended in 1885 and has been subdivided. It is in stone and has a stone slate roof with coped gables, shaped kneelers, and finials. There are two storeys and a front of five bays, the right three bays gabled, and a rear range. In the left bay is a doorway with a quoined surround, a segmental-arched fanlight, and a dated lintel, and in the right return is a blocked doorway with a Tudor arch. The windows are mullioned, some also have transoms, and some have decorative hood moulds.	II
The Navigation; 53.71049°N 1.90007°W		Early to mid 17th century	A house, later a public house, it is in stone with quoins and a stone slate roof. There are two storeys and an attic at the front, three storeys at part of the rear, and four bays. On the front are a round-arched doorway with voussoirs, a blocked doorway with a cornice, and later paired doorways. The windows are mullioned or mullioned and transomed, and in the right return is a taking-in door.	II
22 Burnley Road; 53.71440°N 1.92078°W	—	Mid 17th century (probable)	A stone house with quoins, and a stone slate roof with a coped gable on the left. There are two storeys and one bay, with a later recessed bay added on the right. In the ground floor is a doorway with a chamfered quoined surround and a mullioned window and a continuous hood mould over both. In the upper floor is another mullioned window.	II
148 Scar Bottom; 53.70920°N 1.88018°W	—	17th century	A stone house with a stone roof and two storeys, with the east end built into a hillside. It contains a mullioned and transomed window, and elsewhere are stone-framed windows. There is a later porch, a lean-to at the rear, and an extension to the west.	II
Gatehouse, Willow Hall Lane; 53.71409°N 1.90223°W	—	Middle to late 17th century (probable)	The former gatehouse to Willow Hall, it has been altered. It is in stone with a hipped stone slate roof. There are two storeys with a basement, and one bay, with a single-storey half-bay to the right. In the ground floor of the main bay is a round-arched gateway with a chamfered surround, imposts, and moulded voussoirs that has been converted into a mullioned window. Above it is a moulded cornice on decorated corbels, and a frieze with a keystone carved with a face. The upper floor contains a two-light mullioned window with a hood mould, and in the half-bay is a doorway.	II
Barn west of Barn Cottage; 53.71450°N 1.90695°W	—	Late 17th century (probable)	The barn is timber framed, encased in stone, and has quoins and a stone roof. There are five bays and an aisle. In the centre is a cart entry with a chamfered quoined surround and a monolithic lintel, and in the aisle is a blocked doorway with a chamfered surround and tiestones. At the rear is a central quoined car entry, and in both fronts are vents.	II
54 Sowerby Street; 53.70631°N 1.91655°W	—	1672	A stone house on a plinth, with quoins, a moulded band, and a stone slate roof. There are two storeys and a partial basement, and two bays. Steps lead up to a doorway on the left, with a quoined, chamfered and moulded surround, and an ogee dated lintel. In the basement are segmental-headed openings, the left one a mullioned window, and the other windows are sashes.	II
Old Hall and gate pier 53.71141°N 1.88775°W	—	1690 (or earlier)	The house is in stone, the south wing is rendered, and the roof is in stone. It consists of a central single-storey range flanked by two-storey gabled cross-wings. In the angle is a two-storey gabled porch with an arched doorway. The central range contains mullioned and transomed windows, and elsewhere there are mullioned windows, stepped with hood moulds in the south wing. At the front of the garden there is one surviving gate pier with a moulded entablature.	II
Barn northwest of Blackwall Farm; 53.71445°N 1.91644°W	—	Early 18th century (probable)	The barn. later used for other purposes, is in stone with a roof of stone slate and corrugated sheet. There are three bays and an outshut to the right front bay. In the centre is a cart entry with a quoined surround and a monolithic lintel and a doorway to the left, and there is a similar cart entry at the rear.	II
Beech House; 53.71084°N 1.90784°W	—	Early to mid 18th century	The house, later divided into two, is in stone with quoins, and a stone slate roof with coped gables and a shaped kneeler on the right. There are two storeys on the road front, three storeys at the rear, and five bays. The openings have plain surrounds, most of the windows are mullioned, on the front is a transomed stair window, and at the rear is a two-storey canted bay window.	II
Milepost; 53.70503°N 1.91821°W		18th century	The milepost is at the junction of Haugh End Lane and Jerry Lane, it stands against the churchyard wall of St George's Church, and is an upright stone with a rounded op. The milepost is inscribed with pointing hands and the distances to Elland and to Sowerby.	II
Outbuilding, Willow House; 53.71885°N 1.90198°W	—	18th century (probable)	A former barn or stable attached to the rear of the house, it is in stone with a stone roof. The openings include stone-framed windows and archways, and the building has been considerably altered.	II
The Moorings; 53.70964°N 1.90385°W		c. 1770	Canal warehouses, later used for other purposes, the building is in stone with a stone slate roof. There are three storeys, and an L-shaped plan, with wings of nine and three bays. The building contains two-storey round-headed wagon arches with quoins and voussoirs, loading doors, doorways, and windows with small-pane glazing.	II
The Wet Dock; 53.70989°N 1.90255°W		c. 1775 (probable)	The wet dock and associated warehouse were built by the Rochdale Canal Company. The warehouse is in stone with a corrugated asbestos roof, and has three storeys and sides of seven and three bays. The openings have plain surrounds, and the windows have mullions. There are loading bays on each floor in two of the bays on the long side and one at the end facing the quay. In the end facing the dock is a tall central archway.	II*
50 Sowerby Street; 53.70643°N 1.91638°W	—	Late 18th century	A wool store, later a house, it is in stone with quoins and a stone slate roof. There are two storeys and a loft, and a front of two bays. The openings on the front have plain surrounds, In the left return is a central blocked cart entry with a quoined surround, imposts, and voussoirs, and a doorway on the left. The loft contains a taking-in door flanked by windows, all under a wooden canopy on corbels. In the left return and at the rear are mullioned windows.	II
Barn southwest of Hoyle House; 53.71576°N 1.92093°W	—	Late 18th century	A stone barn with a stone slate roof, three bays, and an outshut on the left. In the centre is a two-piece segmental-arched cart entry with double doors, an impost, and a keystone. Above it is a three-light mullioned window flanked by lunettes, and to the sides are doorways.	II
75, Wharf Street; 53.71032°N 1.90481°W		Late 18th century	A house, later a restaurant, at one time called The Ash Tree, it is in stone on a plinth, with quoins and a stone slate roof. There are three storeys, a symmetrical front of five bays, and a rear wing on the left. The central doorway has columns and pilasters, and a cornice hood and blocking course on consoles. In the ground floor are canted bay windows with shaped parapets, there is an arched window in the left return, and the other windows are modern.	II
Calder House and stable 53.71014°N 1.90336°W		1779	Originally a house and offices for the Rochdale Canal, later used for other purposes, the building is in stone with quoins, a sill band, and a stone slate roof. There are three storeys and a basement at the front, two storeys at the rear, five bays at the front and two at the rear, and a two-storey former stable recessed on the left. Cantilevered steps with an iron handrail lead up to a ground floor doorway with a fanlight, and above it is a tall round-arched stair window. The openings have plain raised surrounds, some of the windows are casements and others are sashes.	II
Lower Willow Hall; 53.71395°N 1.90264°W	—	1790	The house, which was extended in 1860, is in stone with some brick, on a plinth, with rusticated quoins, a sill band, a moulded cornice, and a hipped stone slate roof. There are two storeys, a front of five bays, sides of three bays, and a later range at the rear. The middle bay of the south front is canted, and there are doorways in the right return, in the projecting later range, and in the left return. In the left return is a Venetian window, and the other windows are sashes.	II
Greenup's Mill; 53.70852°N 1.91065°W	—	1792	A woollen textile mill, later converted for residential use, it is in stone, with a stone slate roof. There are four storeys, ten bays, and later additions. In the centre of the east front is a gable over three bays. There are various openings, some of which have been altered.	II
The Salt Warehouse; 53.70957°N 1.90319°W		c. 1796	The warehouse, which was built by the Calder and Hebble Navigation Company, is in stone, and has three storeys and six bays. The warehouse contains three two-storey elliptical archways with rounded corners. To the right are loading doors in each floor, there are more on the right return facing the canal, and elsewhere there are windows.	II
Lock No. 1; 53.70927°N 1.90427°W		c. 1798	The lock connects the Rochdale Canal with Sowerby Basin. It is in stone with quoins, and has recesses in the side walls at both ends for lock gates.	II
Lock No. 2; 53.70929°N 1.90617°W		c. 1798	The lock on the Rochdale Canal is at the west end of Old Causeway. It is in stone with quoins, and has recesses in the side walls at both ends for lock gates, iron buffers, and a culvert entrance in each lock gate.	II
Sowerby Long Bridge; 53.71232°N 1.92055°W		c. 1798	The bridge forms a tunnel to carry Hollins Mill Lane over the Rochdale Canal. It is in stone and consists of a quoined horseshoe arch with tiestones. The bridge has a coped parapet, and at the southwest angle is a pilaster buttress that rises into a pier with a pyramidal capstone.	II
Bridge over River Calder; 53.70984°N 1.89540°W		c. 1800	The bridge carries Fall Lane over the River Calder. It is in stone, and consists of three segmental arches, the southern arch narrower. The bridge has a triangular cutwater, pilaster buttresses, a band, and triangular coping rising over the buttresses.	II
Willow Clough and Willow Lodge; 53.71556°N 1.90665°W	—	c. 1800	A house later divided into two, it is in stone and has hipped stone slate roofs. There are two storeys and eight bays, the middle four bays projecting. The middle bays contain sash windows with architraves, and in each pair of outer bays is a central French window with a plain surround and a moulded cornice. The entrance is at the rear.	II
The Jolly Sailor; 53.70929°N 1.90720°W	—	Late 18th to early 19th century	Originally a public house, and later pair of houses which have been combined, the building is in stone with quoins, a floor band, and a stone slate roof. There are two storeys and an attic, and a gabled front of two bays. The doorway has a fanlight and a console on consoles. The windows are sashes, and in the attic is a Venetian window.	II
Allangate (east part); 53.71509°N 1.88941°W	—	c. 1810	Part of a mansion, later subdivided, to which an east wing was added in about 1870. It is in stone with a hipped blue slate roof. The original part is in Classical style and the extension in Italianate style. There are two storeys, an attic and a basement. The original part on the left has a two-storey bow window on the left, a doorway, quoin pilasters, and a glazed pyramid on the roof. In the link to the right are two arched stair windows. The east wing has a rusticated basement, quoins, and a French window and a balcony with a balustrade. The right return has three symmetrical bays, and contains a recessed doorway with an impost and keystone, flanked by French windows with architraves.	II*
Allangate (west part); 53.71517°N 1.88976°W	—	c. 1810	Part of a mansion, later subdivided, to which a west wing was added in about 1845. It is in stone with a blue slate roof, in Italianate style, and has two and three storeys. On the left is an entrance link with a verandah, to the right the west wing projects, it has one bay, and contains quoins, a frieze and windows. Further to the right is a two-bay link with a conservatory on the front, then the west bay of the original house. This contains a tripartite window in a recessed arch, and a hipped roof.	II
Walls, gatepiers, terrace and steps to front of Allangate; 53.71491°N 1.88965°W	—	c. 1810	Along the boundary at the front of the garden is a tall stone wall, and to its left is a lower wall surmounted by an apron with rusticated panels. The gate piers have tapering rusticated panels, cornices, and ball finials. The house is on a terrace that has retaining walls with pilaster strips, and there are flights of steps with half-landings flanked by stepped walls with ramped copings. At the east end are quadrant walls with piers linking with the house.	II
Gas Works Bridge; 53.70945°N 1.89985°W	—	1816	The bridge, which was later widened, carries Gas Works Road over the River Calder. It has stone abutments, and consists of a single cast iron segmental arch, and it was widened in steel. The face of the bridge consists of steel panels bolted together and rising in centre, and above there are railings.	II
Christ Church; 53.70995°N 1.90714°W		1819	The church was designed by John Oates in Perpendicular style, the chancel was rebuilt in 1873–74, and the church was re-roofed in 1894. It is built in stone, and consists of a nave, a chancel with a north organ loft, and a west tower flanked by two-storey porches. The tower has three stages, diagonal buttresses, clock faces, and an embattled parapet with corner pinnacles. There are also embattled parapets on the porches and along the body of the church. Between the bays are buttresses that rise to pinnacles. Inside there is a horseshoe gallery and a hammerbeam roof.	II
Gateway and gates, Christ Church; 53.71011°N 1.90666°W	—	1819 (probable)	At the east end of the churchyard is a pair of wrought iron gates. The gate piers are in rusticated stone, and each has a chamfered base, an oval panel, and a string course, and on the south pier is a dentil cornice and a ball finial on a stepped base.	II
Wall, gateways and gates, Christ Church; 53.70966°N 1.90718°W	—	1819 (probable)	The walls enclosing the west and south sides of the churchyard are in stone with chamfered coping and iron railings. At the north end of the west wall are two piers with pyramidal capstones. In the south wall are two entrances flanked by stone gate piers, each pier with a tall base, and sunk panels with pointed arches, above which is an octagonal section, a band and a capstone with gablets. Between each pair of piers is an overthrow with scrolled brackets and bars with finials.	II
Milestone; 53.71423°N 1.91890°W		Early 19th century	Th milestone is set in a wall on the north side of Burnley Road (A646 road). It is an upright stone with a curved top, and is inscribed with "LUDDEDENFOOT" and pointing hands with the distances to Halifax and Todmorden.	II
Former Bolton Brow Methodist Church and Warehouse; 53.71026°N 1.90279°W	—	1831	The building is in stone with a hipped slate roof. It is built on sloping ground, at the front there are two storeys, and at the rear there are six. The upper two storeys were used as a chapel, and the lower storeys as a canal warehouse. There is a front of five bays and sides of six bays. The front is symmetrical, with a rusticated ground floor, a floor band, a cornice, and a blocking course. The middle bay is recessed and contains in the ground floor a Venetian window with fluted pilasters, and a keystone, and in the upper floor a tripartite window with an apron and a keystone; both windows contain sashes. The outer bays each contains a doorway with a fanlight, and architrave, a frieze and a cornice, and sash windows, those in the upper storey with round-arched heads. At the rear are wide doorways, sash windows, and, in the chapel, another Venetian window.	II
Gateway in grounds of Borough Area Office; 53.70665°N 1.91714°W	—	Early to mid 19th century	The gateway and flanking walls are in stone. The gateway has a pointed arch with a quoined surround, and is flanked by square embattled towers, each with an arrow slit and bands. The walls extend for about 2 metres (6 ft 7 in) to the west and at right angles for about 5 metres (16 ft) to the south. The walls are embattled with coped merlons, and in the south wall is a blocked quoined doorway.	II
Wharf House; 53.71015°N 1.90434°W		1837	A porter's lodge, later used for other purposes, it is in stone, and has a stone slate roof with coped gables, shaped kneelers, and a finial. There is one storey, and a T-shaped plan, consisting of a range of one bay, and a two-storey two-bay cross-wing. The doorway has a chamfered surround, and in the cross-wing is a canted bay window with a mullioned window above.	II
St George's Church; 53.70475°N 1.91854°W		1839–40	The church, which is in Neo-Norman style, is built in stone and has a stone slate roof. It consists of a nave with a north vestry, a chancel with an apse and a north aisle, and a west tower. The tower has three stages, pilaster buttresses, and a parapet. Along the sides of the nave are round-arched windows with pilaster buttresses between, and at the east end are three stepped round-arched windows with a hood mould.	II
Railings, gates and gate piers, St George's Church; 53.70493°N 1.91839°W	—	1839–40 (probable)	The railings are in cast iron and stand on dwarf walls enclosing the northwest, northeast, southeast and west sides of the churchyard. The walls have chamfered coping, and the gates are also in cast iron. The gate piers are in stone with a square section and have sunk panels, cornices and pyramidal caps.	II
Hollas Bridge; 53.70493°N 1.88681°W		c. 1840	The bridge was designed by George Stephenson, and built by the Manchester and Leeds Railway to carry its line over a lane. It is in stone, and consists of a tall round arch with voussoirs, imposts, and a parapet with flat coping. The bridge is flanked by pilaster buttresses, and retaining wing walls.	II
Railway bridge over Fall Lane; 53.70808°N 1.89696°W	—	c. 1840	The bridge was designed by George Stephenson, and built by the Manchester and Leeds Railway to carry its line over Fall Lane. It is in stone, and consists of three segmental arches with voussoirs, stepped canted pilaster buttresses, and bands below the parapet, which has flat coping and pyramidal capstones above the buttresses. At the south end the parapet continues as a ramped wall, and at the north end the wall ends in a pier.	II
Carlton Mill and weaving shed 53.70883°N 1.90932°W		1850	The weaving shed was added to the mill later in the 19th century. The mill is in stone with an eaves cornice, and a stone slate roof with coped gables and kneelers. There are four storeys facing the street, and six facing the canal, with five bays at the ends, and eleven along the sides. To the left is a single-storey embattled bay. The front facing the road has two gables and in the second bay are loading doors and a hoist in the gable, and in each gable is an oculus. The windows have nine panes, the top panes opening. A tall round-arched carriageway runs through the building, and has rusticated quoins and voussoirs.	II
Chimney to Carlton Mill; 53.70883°N 1.90980°W		1850 (probable)	The chimney is in stone and about 35 metres (115 ft) high. It has an octagonal plan, and tapers as it rises.	II
Lower Western Block, Carlton Mill; 53.70881°N 1.90959°W	—	1850	The former engine shed is in stone, with three storeys and a basement to the south. In the gabled west front are three bays, and the right return has five bays. The building contains a blocked archway, windows, some of which are blocked, and an oculus in the gable.	II
Eaglescliff; 53.71055°N 1.91068°W	—	Mid 19th century	A stone house with a sill band, an eaves band, a moulded cornice, and a hipped Welsh slate roof. There are two storeys and five bays. On the front is a Tuscan porch with columns and pilasters carrying a cornice and a blocking course, and a round-arched doorway with a moulded surround and a fanlight. The windows are sashes.	II
Former Royal Hotel; 53.70710°N 1.91340°W		Mid 19th century	The former hotel is on a corner site, and has been converted into flats, it is in painted and partly rendered stone on a plinth, with a sill band, and a stone slate roof. There are four storeys, six bays in West Street, seven on Sowerby Street, and a curved bay on the corner. The openings have plain surrounds, the windows have mullions and lintels incised as voussoirs, most contain sashes, and in the corner bay they are tripartite. The doorways vary and include a tall door with pilasters, and a round-headed doorway with a double door and a fanlight, and in the West Street front is a shop front.	II
The Bull on the Bridge; 53.70866°N 1.91140°W		Mid 19th century	A hotel and public house, it is in stone with a rusticated basement, moulded sill bands, a moulded cornice, and a slate roof. There are three storeys and a basement, three bays, and a corner bay on the left. Steps with twisted iron balusters lead up to the central round-arched doorway that has a quoined architrave, imposts, a bull's eye keystone. It is flanked by a Tuscan pilasters and an entablature with a dentil cornice. The windows are sashes. The window above the doorway has an architrave and a triangular pediment on consoles, and the central window in the top floor has paired round-arched windows and a hood mould. On the return of the corner bay is a canted bay window in the ground floor and paired arched windows in the top floor.	II
The Shop; 53.70995°N 1.90417°W		Mid 19th century	A weigh house for the Rochdale Canal Company, later used for other purposes, it is in stone with a rusticated plinth, a belt course and a stone slate roof with coped gables, shaped kneelers, and a finial on the right gable. There is one storey, one main bay, and a narrow bay flat-roofed on the right. In the main bay is a canted bay window with a cornice, blocking course and coping, and a doorway on the right.	II
Former Lloyd's Bank; 53.70861°N 1.91188°W		1856–57	Originally the town hall and later a bank, the building is in stone, on a plinth, with rusticated quoins, a dentil cornice, and a parapet, partly balustraded, with coping and vase finials. The building is in Italianate style, and has two storeys, three bays, and a round tower on the corner to the left. The bays contain round-headed windows, in the middle bay they are tripartite with pilasters, keystones, and bracketed cornices. The upper floor window also has a balcony and a segmental pediment over the middle light. The tower has two tall stages. In the lower stage is a Venetian window with colonnettes, pilasters, a balustrade on consoles, a cornice, and a segmental pediment. Above it is a balustrade with festoon decoration, and a cornice. In the top stage are six Ionic pilasters, between which are arched niches with an architrave and a keystone; one niche contains a clock face. Above is an entablature and a ribbed dome with a finial.	II
Victoria Bridge; 53.70694°N 1.91259°W	—	1864	The bridge carries Victoria road over the River Ryburn. It is in iron and consists of two spans with a central stone pier. On the sides are end and central piers with pyramidal caps, the central piers also with inscribed plaques. Between the piers are railings of crossed diagonal, vertical and horizontal struts with a patera in the centre of each cross.	II
Cemetery Chapel; 53.70927°N 1.92286°W		Mid to late 19th century	The cemetery chapel is in stone, and has a slate roof with coped gables, kneelers, and finials, and is in Gothic style. It has a cruciform plan, a north porch, and a lead-covered cupola with an octagonal flèche that has lucarnes and a weathervane. The windows have hood moulds, and the south window is circular with star-shaped tracery.	II
Mill chimney to west of Crestol House; 53.70902°N 1.91239°W		Mid to late 19th century	The mill chimney by the towpath of the Rochdale Canal is in stone and has a square base with a round-arch vent on the north side. It rises to become octagonal, it tapers and rises to a height of about 30 metres (98 ft). Towards the top is a cornice supported by shaped brackets.	II
Stirk Bridge; 53.70598°N 1.91323°W		Mid to late 19th century	The bridge carries Bridge Street over the River Ryburn. It is in iron and consists of two spans with a central stone pier. On the sides are fielded panels, and iron railings with scrolled brackets, and at the ends are stone piers, the south pier with a pyramidal cap.	II
Wainhouse Tower; 53.71235°N 1.88273°W		1871–75	The tower is a folly, initially intended as the chimney for a dye works, but never used for that purpose. It is a slim tower in stone, octagonal on a square base, and 253 feet (77 m) high. It has an elaborate top with a bracketed gallery and lantern in two stages. The upper stage is open and has an ogee top.	II*
Railway Bridge, wall and coal drops 53.70740°N 1.90991°W		c. 1875 (probable)	The bridge, wall and coal drops were built by the Lancashire and Yorkshire Railway. The bridge has a rusticated round arch with voussoirs, it is flanked by flat piers, and has a band and a parapet with flat coping. The retaining wall slopes down to the east. There are 15 coal drops to the west divided by stone piers, and taller, quoined, tapered end piers with chamfered capstones.	II
11, 13 and 15 Town Hall Street; 53.70864°N 1.91158°W	—	Late 19th century	A row of three shops in stone with an eaves band, a dentil cornice, a blocking course, and a slate roof. They have three storeys and one bay each, the bays separated by panelled pilasters and rusticated quoins on the ground floor, and giant Classical pilasters on the upper floors. The ground floor contains 20th-century shop fronts. In the middle floor are tripartite sash windows with pilasters, cornices on consoles, and pediments, segmental in the middle bay and triangular in the outer bays. The top floor contains two-light windows with architraves and decorated keystones.	II
Mill House Lodge; 53.70126°N 1.92509°W		Late 19th century	A pair of lodge cottages in rusticated stone on a plinth, with oversailing eaves, and a Welsh slate roof with gables that have decorative bargeboards and finials. There are two storeys and a T-shaped plan. The doorways have quoined and chamfered surrounds and Tudor arched heads. The windows have square heads and contain three cusped lights. On the front facing the drive is a canted bay window.	II
The Royal Public House; 53.71333°N 1.88659°W		1877	A private house, later a public house, it is in stone on a plinth, with a hipped slate roof. There are two storeys and attic, and two bays, the right bay wider. The doorways are on the sides and have stone hoods. Most of the windows are mullioned and transomed, they are in various styles, and there are dormers, one with a gable, and one with three lights and a flat head.	II
Former Sunday School; 53.71023°N 1.90307°W	—	1882–83	The former Sunday school is in stone, it has a roof of slate and glass, and is in Italianate style. The front facing the street has three bays, the middle bay projecting, and contains two round-headed doorways with moulded surrounds, and with Doric columns between them. Flanking the doorways are Doric columns and pilasters carrying a decorated entablature. Above is a two-light window, and pilasters carrying a pediment containing a circular plaque. In the outer bays are two-light round-headed windows over which are plaques and an entablature and a moulded parapet.	II
Station Surgery; 53.70710°N 1.91073°W		1894	A police station, later extended and used for other purposes, it is in stone, and has a Welsh slate roof with moulded coped gables, and is in Gothic style. There are two storeys and three bays, the middle bay gabled and projecting, the right bay gabled and recessed. In the left bay is a quoined doorway with an elliptical arch, a moulded surround and a cornice, and above it is an inscribed plaque. The windows have quoined moulded surrounds and hood moulds, and at the rear is a gabled porch with ball finials.	II
Walls, railings, gates and gate piers, Station Surgery; 53.70725°N 1.91096°W	—	1894 (probable|)	The low boundary walls are in stone, they are coped, and carry iron railings; the gates are also in iron. There are two pairs of stone gate piers in the north wall and one pair in the south wall. Each pier has a chamfered base, a cornice, and a ball finial.	II
