= Sowerby Bridge Town Hall =

Municipal building in Sowerby Bridge, West Yorkshire, England

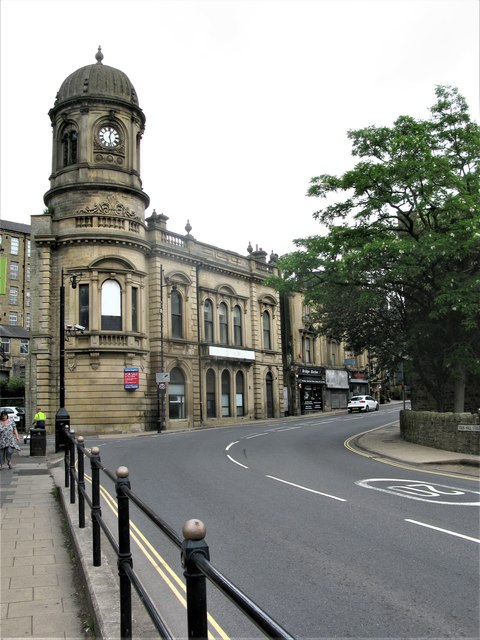
- Sowerby Bridge Town Hall

- Shown in West Yorkshire
- 53.7085°N 1.9118°W
- Location: Town Hall Street, Sowerby Bridge

History
- Built: 1857

Site notes
- Architect(s): William Perkin and Elisha Backhouse
- Architectural style: Italianate style

Listed Building – Grade II
- Official name: Former Lloyds Bank
- Designated: 19 July 1988
- Reference no.: 1319977

Sowerby Bridge Town Hall is a former municipal building in Town Hall Street in Sowerby Bridge, West Yorkshire, England. The building, which was initially used as the offices of the local board of health and as a public events venue, then as the home of the local Liberal Club and later as a bank branch, is a Grade II listed building.

== History ==
Following significant population growth, largely associated with the worsted and cotton industries, a local board of health was established in the Sowerby Bridge area in 1856. In response, a group of local businessmen formed a company to finance and commission a town hall for the area: the site they selected was a prominent location on the north side of the bridge across the River Calder. The foundation stone for the new building was laid by Sir Henry Edwards, 1st Baronet on 12 May 1856. It was designed by William Perkin and Elisha Backhouse in the Italianate style, built in ashlar stone and was officially opened on 30 September 1857.

The design involved a symmetrical rounded frontage at the junction of Town Hall Street and Hollins Mill Lane. The rounded frontage took the form of a three-stage tower with a rusticated section in the first stage, a Venetian window with a balustrade as well as colonettes and pilasters supporting a segmental pediment in the second stage, and a section with six faces separated by Ionic order pilasters in the third stage. The tower was surmounted by a dome and a finial. The elevations along Tower Hill Street and Hollins Mill Lane extended for three bays on each side with the end bays slightly projected forward. The middle bays on each side were fenestrated by triple round headed windows on both floors while the outer bays contained round headed openings on the ground floor and single rounded windows on the first floor. The windows were enhanced by window cills and segmental pediments supported by brackets and, at roof level, there was a parapet. Internally, the principal room was an auditorium capable of accommodating 700 people, in the Hollins Mill Lane wing.

An hour-striking clock, financed by public subscription and intended to serve as memorial to local service personnel who had died in the Crimean War, was installed in the third stage of the tower in 1863; the clock was manufactured by William Potts of Leeds, the bell was by John Warner.

The directors of the company who had developed the building let part of the structure to the local board of health for use as their offices. They had hoped that the local board would ultimately purchase the building but this never transpired. After the resolution of a dispute with a director who disapproved of the sale, the directors instead sold it to the Halifax Joint Stock Banking Company, later known as the West Yorkshire Bank, in May 1881. However, the auditorium continued to be used as a public events venue for concerts and other performances for the rest of the 19th century.

The complex was then acquired by the Sowerby Bridge Liberal Association for use as a Liberal Club in January 1903. After a period of declining use, and then a period of disuse in the 1950s, the auditorium and the rest of the Hollins Mill Lane wing was demolished and the remaining Town Hall Street wing became a branch of Lloyds Bank in 1963. Following the closure of the Lloyds Bank branch in 2018, the building was vacant again, until it was acquired by a restaurateur, Raj Panesar, who began work to convert it into a restaurant in March 2022.
