= Mary Immaculate High School =

Comprehensive school in Wenvoe, Wales

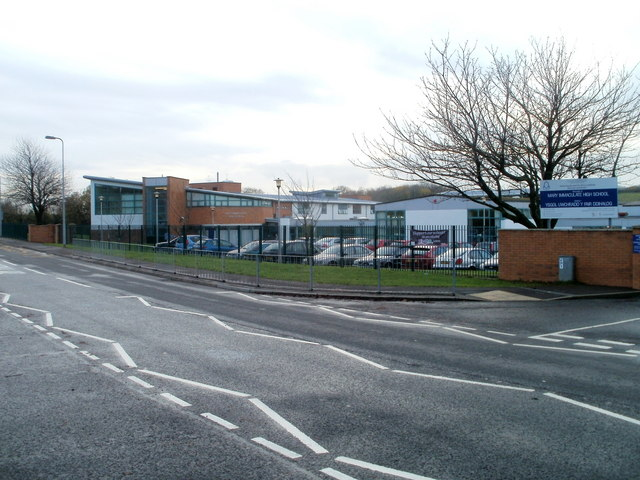

Location
- Caerau Lane; Wenvoe, CF5 5QZ; Wales; 51.4637°N 3.2584°W

Information
- Type: Co-educational comprehensive
- Motto: "To achieve the best for all"
- Religious affiliation: Roman Catholic
- Established: 1963
- Founder: Archdiocese of Cardiff
- Local authority: Cardiff
- Chair of Governors: John Maguire
- Headteacher: Huw Powell
- Staff: 65
- Age: 11 to 16
- Enrolment: 868
- Colours: Navy and White
- Website: www.maryimmaculate.org.uk

Mary Immaculate High School (Welsh: Ysgol Uwchradd Y Fair Ddihalog) is an 11-16 mixed, English-medium, Roman Catholic, comprehensive and faith school located in Wenvoe, Vale of Glamorgan, Wales, although administrated by the Cardiff local education authority.

== History ==
The school was founded in 1963 as Archbishop Mostyn Secondary Modern School, which later merged with, what was then, Cyntwell Boys' School. In 1987 Roman Catholic education was reorganised in the Archdiocese of Cardiff, which saw all secondary schools lose their post-16 education facilities in favour of one united tertiary college, St David's. This saw the creation of Mary Immaculate High School.

From 2006 onward, schemes by the Welsh government and local authorities targeted small, or otherwise unsustainable, schools to re-organise education within Wales; these considerations were underpinned by pressure from the then Assembly Government, Estyn and Audit Commission's goal to 'reduce surplus places' and had been undertaken in school improvement plans such as Port Talbot Council, following the Welsh governments expectations. Among these concerns, there was a corresponding pressure to maximise savings in education expenditure to permit new policy concerns and reducing wastage, a response to budget and the downsizing demographic of pupils. MIHS was among the schools targeted as part of these expectations. In May 2009, MIHS was judged of '[requiring] significant improvement', where less than 30 per cent of the pupils achieved the Level 2 threshold including a GCSE grade A*-C in English or Welsh first language and mathematics. Low demand for places at the school saw Cardiff council mark the school for closure. However, in January 2011, the school had been cleared of closure, identified with 'making good progress' with 'room for further improvement' following improvement in GCSE performance.

In May 2015, Estyn judged the school to be ‘good’, with its prospects for future improvement rated as ‘excellent’.
