= Ryburn Reservoir =

Reservoir in West Yorkshire, England

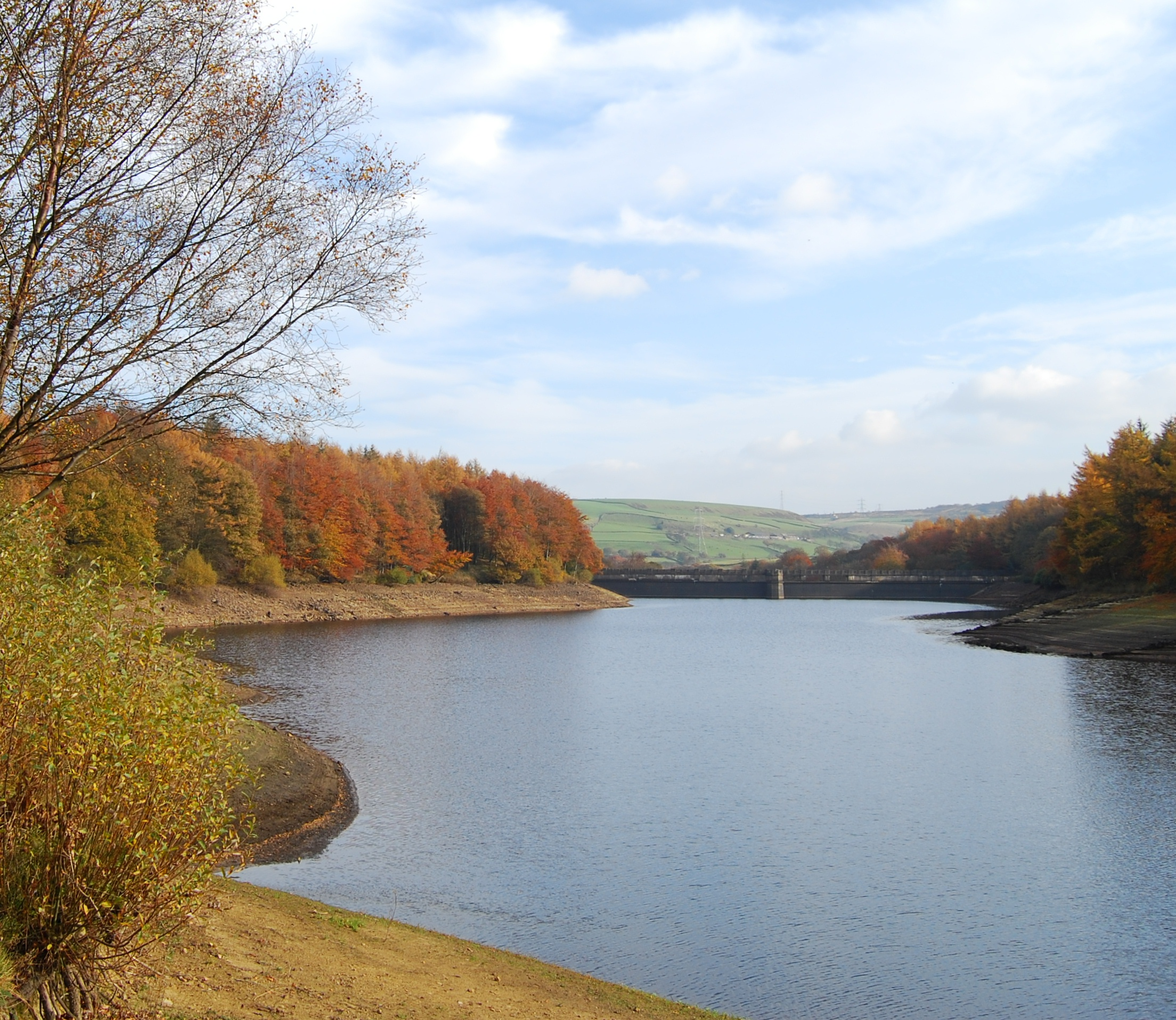

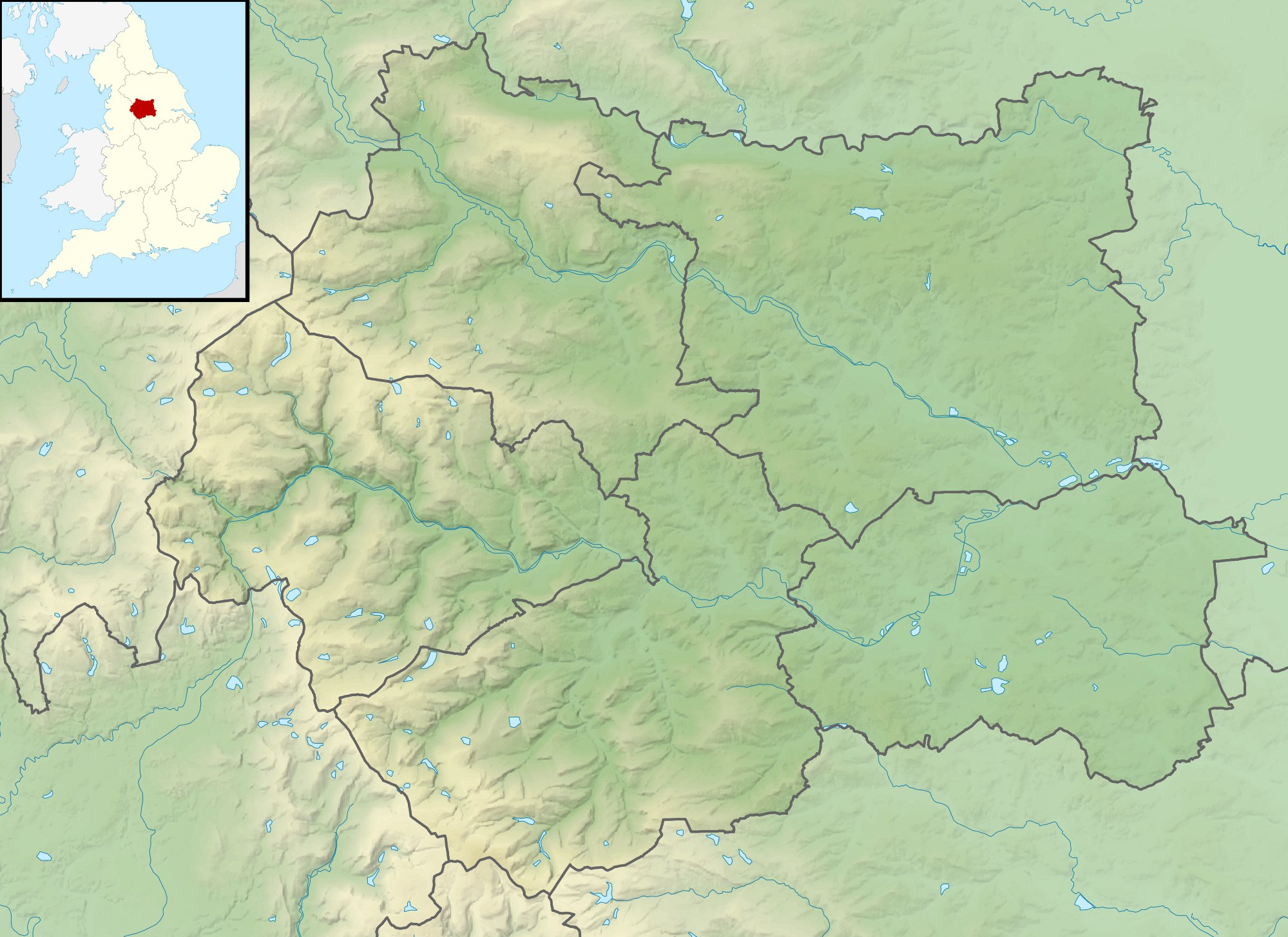
- Location within West Yorkshire
- Location: West Yorkshire
- Coordinates: 53°39′55″N 1°58′09″W
- Type: reservoir
- Basin countries: United Kingdom
- Surface area: 11 ha (27 acres)
- Max. depth: 29 m (95 ft)

Ryburn Reservoir is a supply reservoir operated by Yorkshire Water close to Ripponden in the Yorkshire Pennines, England. It lies in the valley of the River Ryburn and is the lower of two reservoirs built in the valley to supply Wakefield with water and was completed in 1933. The upper reservoir is Baitings Reservoir.

Ryburn reservoir is the earlier of the two reservoirs. It lies just south of the A58 road and its concrete dam is situated in a deep part of the valley. Being surrounded by woods, it is a popular area for walkers just outside the settlements of Ripponden and Rishworth.
