= Greenwood Academy, Birmingham =

Lift Greenwood

Location
- Farnborough Road; Castle Vale; Birmingham, West Midlands, B35 7NL; England
- 52°31′12″N 1°46′56″W

Information
- Type: Academy
- Established: 1967
- Department for Education URN: 139048 Tables
- Ofsted: Reports
- Gender: Coeducational
- Age: 11 to 16, formerly 18
- Enrolment: 956
- Houses: Lancaster, Spitfire, Hurricane and Gladiator
- Colour: Dark Green
- Website: www.liftgreenwood.org

Lift Greenwood (formerly Greenwood Academy) is a coeducational secondary school with academy status, located in Castle Vale, Birmingham, England. Previously named after their heads of years, the academy's four houses have been named after World War II jets since 2025. These include Spitfire, Lancaster, Gladiator and Hurricane.

== History ==
=== Former schools ===
At the Castle Vale school, there was an arson attack on the night of Monday 14 November 1977, with five fire engines. The fire service was on strike.

=== Construction ===
The school opened in new premises in 2017. The current buildings were completed and officially opened in 2017. The school gained Performing Arts College specialist status.

=== Formation ===
The school converted to academy status in January 2013. The school is sponsored by the Academies Enterprise Trust (AET).The school faced much uncertainty when AET arranged a number of Head teachers. Then Mr Harry French was appointed Principal in June 2013 and immediately took action to solve the problems the school faced. Under his leadership the school has been subject to a turnaround, with many esteemed visitors expressing compliments, echoing Lord Nash's comment "..the school oozes aspiration". Mr French and the staff have re-established open events and have regained the confidence of the community. The school will start a new sixth form in September 2014 and the school was rebuilt in 2017. In 2018, during the annual OFSTED report, the school was rated as good. In 2024, the company's name changed from Academies Enterprise Trust to Lift Schools. In July 2025, the schools name was changed from Greenwood Academy to Lift Greenwood.
