= Ryburn Valley High School =

Location
- St. Peters Avenue; Sowerby Bridge, West Yorkshire, HX6 1DF; England; 53.70330°N 1.93168°W

Information
- Type: Academy
- Motto: Strive to Excel
- Established: 1959
- Local authority: Calderdale
- Department for Education URN: 141307 Tables
- Ofsted: Reports
- Chair of Governors: Sarah Hughes
- Head teacher: Donna Watkins
- Age: 11 to 18
- Enrolment: 1,622

Ryburn Valley High School is a secondary school and sixth form located in the town of Sowerby Bridge, West Yorkshire, England. Originally built in the 1950s, it moved into a new building in 2005.

== History ==
Ryburn Valley High School opened in February 1959 as Ryburn County Secondary Modern School. It was a new mixed secondary school representing the merger of Sowerby Bridge Girls' School and Sowerby Bridge Boys' School. The advent of the comprehensive system gave birth to the name Ryburn Valley High School in 1979. It has grown from 600 pupils in 1959 to almost 1500 in 2013.

The new building was confirmed in 2001 and was built from 2004 to 2005. The pupils moved into the building after spring half term in 2005.

Ryburn Valley High School was awarded specialist status in Media Arts in 2004. In 2016, the first Ryburrn Academy Awards were held at the Victoria Theatre in Halifax

The school received a rating of Grade 2, 'Good', for overall effectiveness in its 2013 Ofsted inspection report.

The school converted to academy status in September 2014.

== Television appearances ==
During the spring of 2016, a local camera crew from the BBC used the school as a set piece for the crime/drama television series Happy Valley.

In 2019, Ryburn Valley High School appeared in the CBBC show, Our School. This showed the journey of new Year 7 and 8's joining Ryburn Valley High School.

== Headteachers ==
- 1959–1969 – Robert Miles
- 1969–1976 – John Widdows
- 1976–1978, 1986 – Morton Roberts
- 1978–1986 – William Nicholson
- 1986–1998 – Tony Thorne
- 1998 – Bridget Rickwood (Acting)
- 1999–2008 – Ian Adam
- 2008–2013 – Honor Byford
- 2013–2023 – David Lord
- 2023–Present – Donna Watkins

== Notable former pupils ==
- Craig Fleming, former football player, and former captain of Norwich City Football Club.
