= Hawthorn, Rhondda Cynon Taf =

Coordinates: 51.580923°N 3.306597°W

Hawthorn: Welsh: Y Ddraenen Wen
- Location within Rhondda Cynon Taf
- Population: 3,588 (2011 Ward)
- OS grid reference: ST095877
- Principal area: Rhondda Cynon Taf
- Preserved county: Mid Glamorgan
- Country: Wales
- Sovereign state: United Kingdom
- Post town: PONTYPRIDD
- Postcode district: CF37
- Dialling code: 01443
- Police: South Wales
- Fire: South Wales
- Ambulance: Welsh
- UK Parliament: Pontypridd
- Senedd Cymru – Welsh Parliament: Pontypridd, South Wales Central Electoral Region

Hawthorn (Welsh: Y Ddraenen Wen) is a village and electoral ward within the community of the town of Pontypridd in the County Borough of Rhondda Cynon Taf, located 10 miles north west of Cardiff, the capital city of Wales. Historically this fell within the parish of Eglwysilan within Mid Glamorgan.

The village is home to a pub (Hawthorn inn), a few shops, a post office, a leisure centre, a public swimming pool and Hawthorn High School.

== Electoral ward ==
Hawthorn also forms an electoral ward comprising the settlements of Lower Rhydyfelin and Upper Boat. It elects a county councillor to sit on Rhondda Cynon Taf County Borough Council, with Martin Fidler Jones elected in 2017 for Labour.

Initial proposals for a 2018 review of electoral arrangements by RCT Council as part of the Local Democracy and Boundary Commission for Wales review into electoral arrangements for RCT Council would see the existing Hawthorn ward reduced in size with a new ward created from elements of the neighbouring Rhydfelen Central ward which would equally be reduced in size - creating 3 wards on the footprint of the existing two. The proposals are under consideration by Local Democracy and Boundary Commission for Wales, along with submissions from the public. Any chances would take effect from the 2022 council elections.

For elections to Pontypridd Town Council it is divided into two wards, Hawthorn and Rhydefelin Lower, electing three town councillors.
