= Sowerby Bridge =

Market town in West Yorkshire, England

Coordinates: 53.71°N 1.91°W

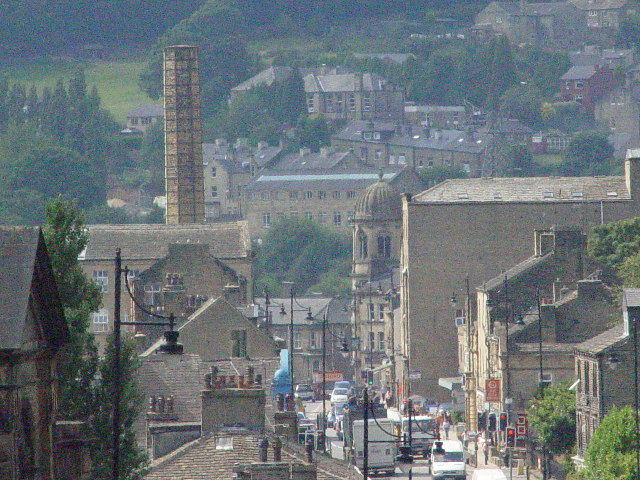
- Sowerby Bridge skyline

- Location within West Yorkshire
- Population: 11,703 (Ward 2011)
- OS grid reference: SE058233
- Metropolitan borough: Calderdale
- Metropolitan county: West Yorkshire
- Region: Yorkshire and the Humber
- Country: England
- Sovereign state: United Kingdom
- Post town: SOWERBY BRIDGE
- Postcode district: HX6
- Dialling code: 01422
- Police: West Yorkshire
- Fire: West Yorkshire
- Ambulance: Yorkshire
- UK Parliament: Halifax

Sowerby Bridge (/ˈsɔːrbi/ SOR-bi) is a market town in the Upper Calder Valley in Calderdale in West Yorkshire, England. The Calderdale Council ward population at the 2011 census was 11,703.

== History ==
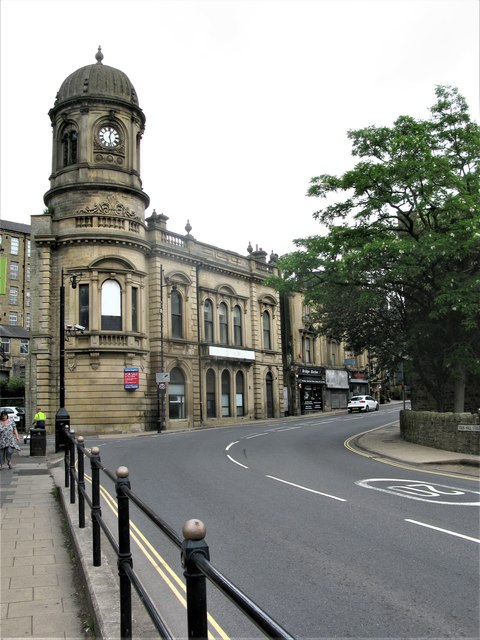
Sowerby Bridge Town Hall, which originally accommodated the offices of the local board and, later, became a branch of Lloyds Bank

The town was originally a fording point over the once much-wider River Calder where it is joined by the River Ryburn. The town takes its name from the historic bridge which spans the river in the town centre. Before the Industrial Revolution the area was divided between the parishes of Sowerby, Norland, Skircoat and Warley. The boundaries between them being the rivers Calder and Ryburn and Warley Clough, which is now largely culverted. Textiles and engineering industry grew up around the bridge. Sowerby Bridge Town Hall, which accommodated the offices of the local board, was completed in 1857.

=== 19th century ===
The Anglican parish church, Christ Church, situated on Wharf Street, is a Grade II listed building. It was built in 1819 by John Oates. The chancel was rebuilt in 1873–74 and the church was re-roofed 1894. The church is still active and the vicar is Revd. Tommy Daglish. The church's first organ was installed in 1825 and replaced in 1865. The organ and much of the church was destroyed in a 1894 fire. A larger organ, built by Abbott and Smith, was installed, and next repaired in 1979. The current organ was installed in 1983, moved from a nearby closed church.

By the mid-19th century the population had grown and the settlement became an urban district in the West Riding of Yorkshire in 1894.

=== 20th century ===
From 1892 to 1930 Pollit & Wigzell manufactured stationary steam engines for the cotton and woollen mills of Yorkshire, Lancashire and India. Wood Brothers, an engineering and millwright company, also produced engines from its Valley Iron Works. The Markfield Beam Engine in north London is an example of its work.

=== 21st century ===
In January 2019, it was announced that the council buildings on Hollins Mill Lane, which include the former offices of Sowerby Bridge Urban District Council, the old swimming pool and old fire station will be transferred to a community group, Sowerby Bridge Fire and Water, and will be renovated for community use.

== Governance ==
The town is part of the Sowerby Bridge ward of the Metropolitan borough of Calderdale, in West Yorkshire.

== Geography ==
Sowerby Bridge is situated about 3 miles (4.8 km) from Halifax town centre. It is at the confluence of the River Calder and River Ryburn, and the name Sowerby Bridge references its situation as a crossing point over the River Calder to the older settlement at Sowerby.

== Education ==
There are two secondary schools in Sowerby Bridge.

- Ryburn Valley High School on St Peter's Avenue
- Trinity Academy Grammar on Albert Road

== Media ==
Local news and television programmes are provided by BBC Yorkshire and ITV Yorkshire. Television signals received from the Emley Moor and one of the three local relay transmitters (Halifax, Luddenden and Ripponden).

Local radio stations are BBC Radio Leeds on 95.3 FM, Hits Radio West Yorkshire on 102.5 FM, Heart Yorkshire on 107.6 FM, Capital Yorkshire on 105.1 FM , Greatest Hits Radio West Yorkshire on 96.3 FM and Phoenix Radio on 96.7 FM, which has its studios in Halifax.

The town is served by the local newspaper the Halifax Courier.

== Transport ==
The town is served by Sowerby Bridge railway station, which sees a regular service to Manchester, Huddersfield (via Brighouse), Halifax, Bradford and Leeds on the Caldervale Line.

The town is at the junction of the Calder and Hebble Navigation and the Rochdale Canal; Tuel Lane Lock on the Rochdale Canal is the deepest lock in the United Kingdom. The canal basin and warehouses where the canals meet, Sowerby Bridge Wharf, are listed buildings and house the Moorings Bar and Restaurant, 12-04 Restaurant and Temujin Mongolian Restaurant. The basin is the headquarters of the 12th Halifax Sea Scouts (M.o.D. No. 54 Royal Navy recognised) where Prince Charles opened the William Andrew Memorial Headquarters. Shire Cruisers run holiday hire canal barges, build narrow boats and provide mooring facilities.

== In popular culture ==
Sowerby Bridge features in George Gissing's 1890 novel The Emancipated as the hometown of the protagonist Ross Mallard.

The canal basin was used as a filming location for the ITV comedy-drama Stay Lucky, and the ITV drama Dead Clever was set in the town. The 2014 BBC One drama Happy Valley was set in Sowerby Bridge and parts of the series were filmed in and around the town. Catherine's workplace is a former police station. The series writer and director Sally Wainwright grew up in Sowerby Bridge.

== Notable residents ==
- John Tillotson (1630–1694), Archbishop of Canterbury
- James Walton (1803–1883), inventor and industrialist
- Walter Lees (1875–1924), professional cricketer for England
- Joe Riley (1876–1954), professional rugby league player for England
- Max Crabtree (1933–2023), professional wrestling promoter
- Glyn Hughes (writer) (1935–2011), English poet, artist and novelist
- Stuart Townend (1963- ), Christian musician, was son of a local vicar
- Justin Hawkins (1975–), front-man of rock band The Darkness, lived in the town as a teenager while studying at Kirklees College

== Traditions ==
Rushbearing, the annual ceremony of (now nominally) taking rushes to churches for covering the floors throughout winter, still takes place in Sowerby Bridge over the first weekend of September.

The Fire & Water Festival is an annual festival to raise awareness for the Fire & Water Buildings in Sowerby Bridge. It showcases all the events that Fire & Water put on throughout the year and the Music Festival showcases local artists on an open and accessible stage.

== Boxing Day floods 2015 ==
Local river monitoring stations recorded a level of 11 feet 8 inches (3.55 m) between 12 pm and 6 pm, surpassing previous recorded highs of 8 feet 0 inches (2.43 m) (23 June 2012). Known flood plains, such as Dixie Woods and Sowerby Bridge Cricket Club, were submerged to an estimated depth of 2 feet (61 cm). The floods were reported as the worst in the area since 1968. The town was flooded again on 9 February 2020 by Storm Ciara, causing a similar amount of damage to the 2015 floods.

== See also ==
- Listed buildings in Sowerby Bridge
