= Hawthorn High School =

Location
- School Lane; Hawthorn, Pontypridd, Rhondda Cynon Taff, CF37 5AL; Wales
- Coordinates: 51°34′43″N 3°18′26″W

Information
- Motto: "Health, Happiness, Success"
- Local authority: Rhondda Cynon Taff
- Gender: Coeducational
- Age: 11 to 18

Hawthorn High School (Welsh: Ysgol Uwchradd Y Hawthorn) was an English-medium comprehensive school in the village of Hawthorn near Pontypridd, in the county borough of Rhondda Cynon Taf, Wales. It was featured in the CBBC documentary series Our School in 2018, appearing in series five.

In 2024, Hawthorn High School was demolished. The new school Ysgol Afon Wen adjacent to the former Hawthorn High School opened its doors to all staff and pupils in September 2024.
