= River Ryburn =

River in West Yorkshire, England

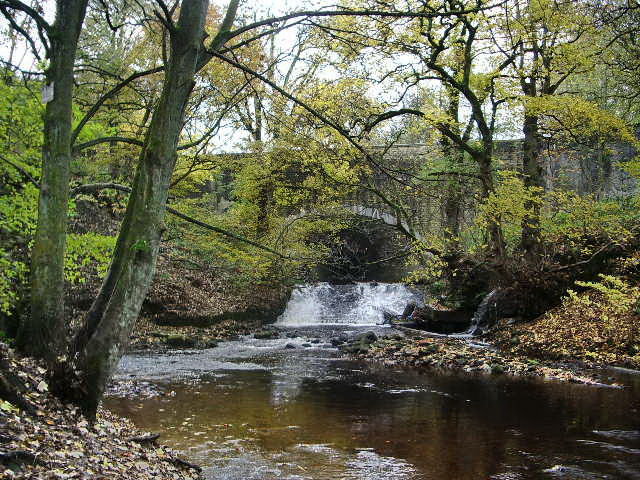
- River Ryburn With Slitheroe Bridge hidden in the trees, this bridge carries the A672 over the river. 53°39′55.77″N 1°56′56.8″W

Location
- Country: England

Physical characteristics
- Source
  - location: Confluence of rag sapling clough and Black Castle Clough nr Rishworth
  - coordinates: 53°39′35″N 2°1′29″W
  - elevation: 361 metres (1,184 ft)
- Mouth
  - location: River Calder at Sowerby Bridge
  - coordinates: 53°42′28″N 1°54′42″W
  - elevation: 80 metres (260 ft)
- Length: 11.4 km (7.1 mi)
- Basin size: 13 km^{2} (5.0 sq mi)

The River Ryburn is a river in West Yorkshire, England. It flows through the villages of Rishworth, Ripponden and Triangle before flowing into the River Calder at Sowerby Bridge.

== Course ==
The river becomes known as Ryburn at the confluence of Rag Sapling Clough and Black Castle Clough to the east of Blackstone Edge Reservoir. It flows east parallel to the A58 Rochdale Road into Baitings reservoir. It emerges from the east end of the reservoir for a short time before flowing into Ryburn Reservoir. The river flows out of the east end of the reservoir just to the north of the village of Rishworth, before turning north east and flowing through Ripponden. After leaving the town, it flows north to Triangle before turning north east again, flowing through Sowerby Bridge and joining the River Calder.

== History ==
The bridge on the B6113, Elland Road, in Ripponden was once part of the Elland Turnpike in 1815. It was originally built in 1772 and widened and altered in the nineteenth century. Next to this bridge is the original Ripponden Old Bridge which has been around since at least 1313.

Baitings and Ryburn reservoirs were built for Wakefield Corporation. Baitings was opened on 14 November 1956 after eight years' work and a cost of £1.4 million. It is 64 acres (26 ha) large with a volume of 775 million gallons (3.5 million cubic metres), reaching a depth of 155 feet (47 m). The dam at the east end of the reservoir is 1,550 feet (470 m) across and 185 feet (56 m) high. At low water levels, the old road and bridge become visible. Ryburn Reservoir was the first to be opened on 7 September 1933 after eight years' construction at a cost of £240,000. The dam at the east end of the reservoir is approximately 100 feet (30 m) high. It has a volume of 220 million gallons (1 million cubic metres) and covers 26 acres (11 ha), which includes the submerged village of Bogden.

Local landowner John Rawson (1813–1899) was responsible for the planting of much of the woodland along the River Ryburn valley.

== Lists ==
=== Tributaries ===
- Knave Holes Clough
- Dry Clough
- White Hollow Clough
- Scar Clough
- Greenwood Clough
- Horse Hey Clough
- Clay Clough
- Hutch Brook
- Booth Wood Clough
- Old Eli Clough
- Highlee Clough
- Nether Ends Beck

=== Settlements ===
- Rishworth
- Ripponden
- Ripponden Wood
- Kebroyd
- Triangle
- Sowerby Bridge

=== Crossings ===
- Dhoul's Pavement
- Baitings Viaduct
- A672, Slitheroe Bridge, Ripponden
- B6113, Elland Road, Ripponden
- Old Ripponden Bridge
- Stansfield Bridge, Triangle
- Unnamed Road, Sowerby Bridge
- Watson Bridge, Sowerby Bridge
- Scar Head Road, Sowerby Bridge
- Victoria Road, Sowerby Bridge
- Station Road, Sowerby Bridge
- Northern Rail Leeds to Manchester Line

== Gallery ==
Along the River Ryburn
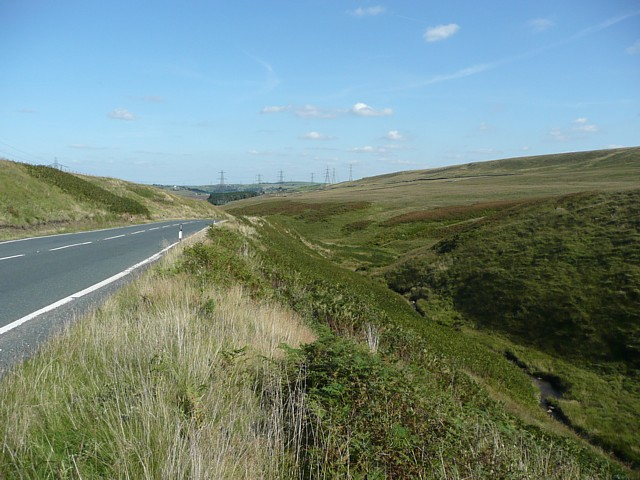
The A58 and the River Ryburn, Soyland

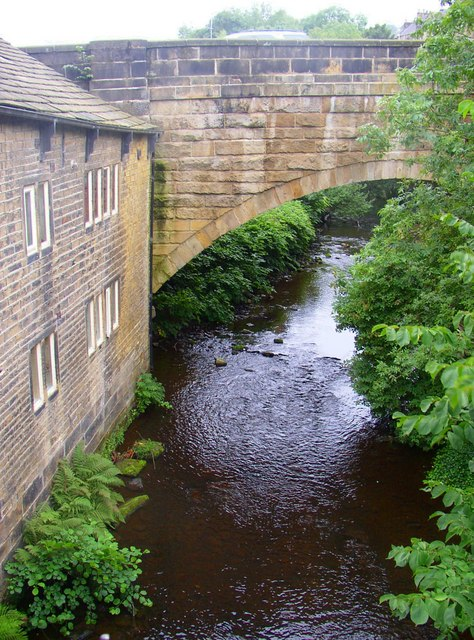
Elland Road Bridge, Ripponden.

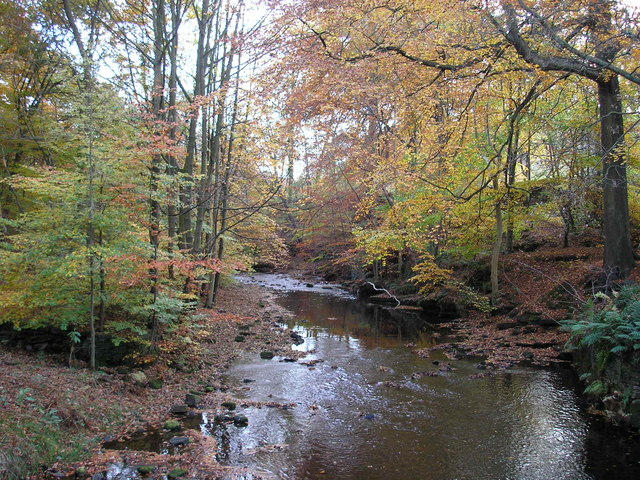
River Ryburn from the footbridge at Kebroyd

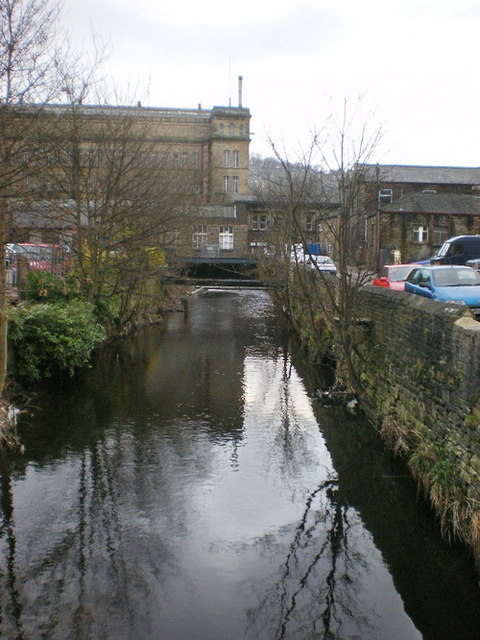
River Ryburn with Asquith Bottom Mills in the background

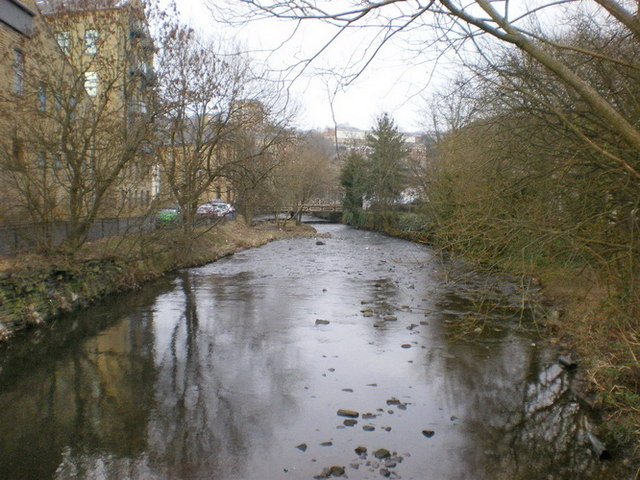
River Ryburn looking downstream from Stirk Bridge

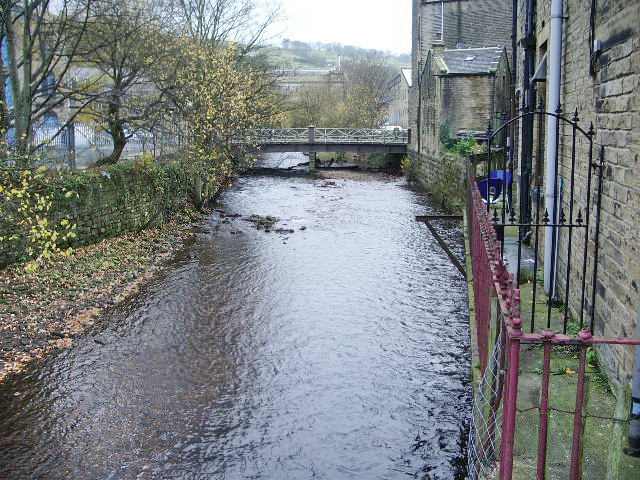
River Ryburn in Sowerby Bridge

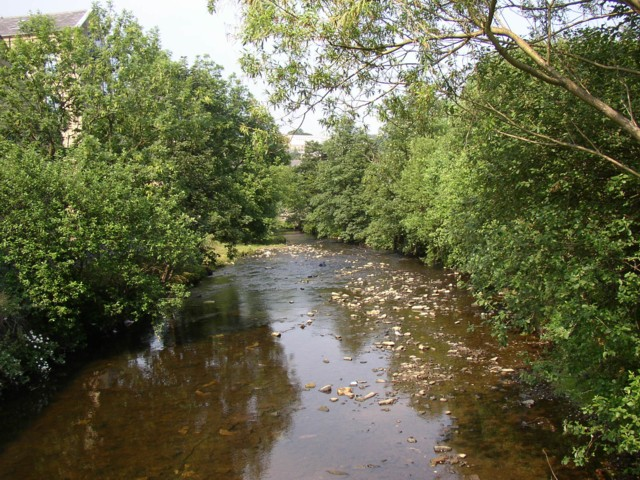
River Ryburn, Sowerby Bridge

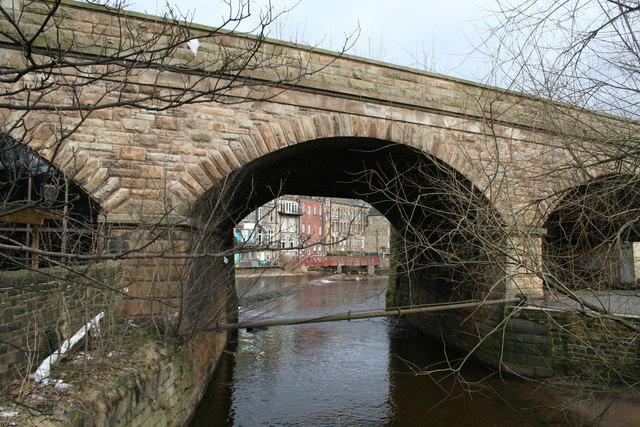
Railway bridge over the River Ryburn, Sowerby Bridge

== Sources ==
- Ordnance Survey Open Viewer https://www.ordnancesurvey.co.uk/business-government/tools-support/open-data-support
- Google Earth
- National Environment Research Council - Centre for Ecology and Hydrology http://www.ceh.ac.uk/index.html
- Environment Agency http://www.environment-agency.gov.uk/
