= Upper Calder Valley =

Valley in West Yorkshire, England

Coordinates: 53.720°N 2.004°W

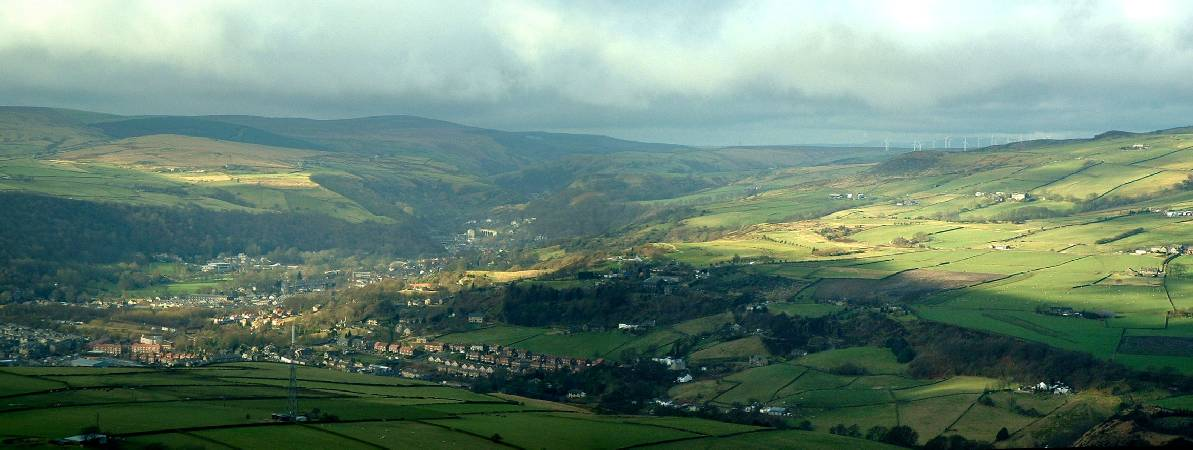
Upper Calder Valley, West Yorkshire

The Upper Calder Valley lies in West Yorkshire, in northern England, and covers the towns of Todmorden, Hebden Bridge, Mytholmroyd, Luddendenfoot, and Sowerby Bridge, as well as a number of smaller settlements such as Portsmouth, Cornholme, Walsden, and Eastwood. The valley is the upper valley of the River Calder. Major tributaries of the Upper Calder include the Walsden Water, which flows through the large village of Walsden to join the Calder at Todmorden; the Hebden Water, which flows through Hebden Dale to join the Calder at Hebden Bridge; Cragg Brook, which flows through Cragg Vale to join the Calder at Mytholmroyd, and the largest, the River Ryburn, which joins the Calder at Sowerby Bridge.

The Upper Calder Valley falls entirely within the much larger metropolitan district of Calderdale. The towns of the Upper Calder are situated linearly along the valley, which cuts through the eastern slopes of the Pennines from Portsmouth in the west to Sowerby Bridge, a market town on the outskirts of Halifax, in the east.

== In popular culture ==
The rugged and steep-sided Upper Calder Valley inspired such literary artists as the poets Ted Hughes (who was born in Mytholmroyd and wrote about Scout Rock), Sylvia Plath (who is buried in Heptonstall, near Hebden Bridge) and the writer Emily Brontë. The valley has also been a popular setting for film and TV, such as the series Happy Valley and is a major location in the Rampart Trilogy by M.R. Carey.
