= List of Happy Valley episodes =

Happy Valley is a British crime drama television series created by Sally Wainwright and produced by Red Production Company. The first series of six episodes started airing on BBC One in the United Kingdom on 29 April 2014. It was released on Netflix in the United States and Canada on 20 August 2014. A second six-episode series began airing on BBC One on 9 February 2016 and was made available on Netflix in the US later that year.

The BBC announced Series 3 on 26 October 2021 with filming scheduled to begin in 2022. Series 3 started airing on BBC One on 1 January 2023.

== Series overview ==
Series	Episodes	Originally released		Average UK viewers (millions)
Series	Episodes	First released	Last released	Average UK viewers (millions)
1	6	29 April 2014	3 June 2014	8.19
2	6	9 February 2016	15 March 2016	9.36
3	6	1 January 2023	5 February 2023	9.16

== Episodes ==
=== Series 1 (2014) ===
No. in series	Title	Directed by	Written by	Original release date	Viewers (millions)
1	"Episode One"	Euros Lyn	Sally Wainwright	29 April 2014	8.64
Catherine Cawood is a sergeant in the Calder Valley in West Yorkshire that is riddled with a drug culture that is daunting to tackle. She lives with her sister, Clare, a recovering heroin addict, and is bringing up her eight-year-old grandson, Ryan. Whilst visiting Ryan's teacher regarding the boy's behavioural problems, Catherine reveals that his father is a man called Tommy Lee Royce, who raped her daughter Becky. Catherine believes that the rape was what drove her daughter to suicide shortly after giving birth. Kevin Weatherill is an accountant in a large company run by his late father's best friend, Nevison Gallagher. When Nevison refuses to raise Kevin's pay so that he can afford to send his daughters to a better school, he devises a plot with local thug Ashley Cowgill to kidnap Nevison's daughter, Ann, and hold her for ransom. Cowgill involves two of his employees, Lewis Whippey and Royce, but demands more money than planned thus causing Kevin's scheme to backfire. After Nevison changes his mind and agrees to pay both of Kevin's daughters' school fees, Kevin calls Cowgill to cancel their plans, but it is too late: Ann has already been kidnapped by Whippey and Royce. Kevin travels to the police station and begins to make a statement to Catherine anonymously, but Catherine records his number plate when he drives off after changing his mind.
2	"Episode Two"	Euros Lyn	Sally Wainwright	6 May 2014	7.62
Overcome with guilt, Kevin confesses everything to his wife, Jenny, who urges him not to take his cut of the ransom money, though he is reluctant to refuse it. Nevison asks Kevin to help deliver the ransom money to the kidnappers without alerting the police (at Cowgill's request), so Kevin delivers the first portion in person. When checking on Ann, Whippey learns that Royce has raped her. After spotting Royce, but quickly losing track of him, Catherine seeks the help of local businesses to find him. She later receives a call saying that Royce has been spotted and then sees him through the window of the house where, unbeknownst to her, Ann is being held. It is made clear through conversation that while not shown, Royce has raped Ann. Royce informs Cowgill, who in turn tells Kevin that police appear to have some interest in the house. Meanwhile, Catherine grows impatient with her ex-husband Richard and his refusal to accept Ryan as his grandson.
3	"Episode Three"	Euros Lyn	Sally Wainwright	13 May 2014	7.69
Young police officer and Catherine's protégé, Kirsten McAskill, pulls over a speeding van being driven by Whippey. After asking him to open the back door (where Ann is being held temporarily), Kirsten is murdered by Royce. Cowgill panics and fears being caught to the point of contemplating abandoning the plot altogether. Nevison's wife Helen urges him to inform the police of the kidnapping, but he refuses due to being fearful that disobeying the kidnappers would further endanger Ann. Whippey demonstrates compassion towards Ann, but tells her that he feels that he can't help her. As Catherine struggles to come to terms with Kirsten's death (for which she blames herself), she has flashbacks to when her daughter died. She later returns to the house where she saw Royce, breaks in, and finds it empty, but discovers evidence of the kidnapping. She then prioritises her pursuit of him.
4	"Episode Four"	Sally Wainwright	Sally Wainwright	20 May 2014	8.33
After Cowgill had ordered Royce to "dispose" of Ann, Royce chose to keep her in his mother's cellar instead, rather than kill her. Helen and Nevison finally inform the police about the kidnapping, but Catherine says that it is unlikely that Ann will be released alive. He tells Catherine and Phil Crabtree, a Detective Inspector with the National Crime Agency, that Kevin has been delivering the money to service stations and that the kidnappers specifically requested for Kevin to do so; this alarms Catherine because of her earlier encounter with him in the police station. Royce runs into Catherine outside Ryan's school, but when she warns Royce to stay away from them, he tells Ryan that he is his father. Catherine then visits Royce's mother only to find Ann being held captive in the cellar. However, Royce returns before Ann is freed and overpowers Catherine, but she and Ann manage to escape.
5	"Episode Five"	Tim Fywell	Sally Wainwright	27 May 2014	8.10
Catherine fights for her life in hospital after Royce's attack, which police are treating as attempted murder of a police officer. Royce informs Cowgill that Ann has escaped, so Cowgill cuts off contact with him and Whippey, who then become fugitives. After questioning, Kevin is arrested on suspicion of "abduction and demanding money with menaces" when detectives learn that he was lying about where the money had been delivered. Cowgill is later arrested for the same offence, but is released after confessing to the police about the large drug smuggling trade he was part of and agrees to put himself and his family into witness protection. Catherine learns of all this while in hospital and also that the white van involved in the murder of PC Kirsten McAskill is registered to Cowgill. Ann manages to sneak into the hospital to see Catherine where she confesses that Royce raped her. She tells Catherine that she doesn't want her mum to know, pointing out that her terminal cancer will kill her long before they get to trial, but knows her dad will need to know but she can't bring herself to do it. Catherine offers to tell him instead. After pulling through, Catherine begins to suffer from depression after learning Royce is still at large and that she missed Kirsten's funeral. Royce and Whippey hide in a flat owned by Brett McKendrick, a friend of Whippey's. After police search the flat, Royce overhears Whippey tell Brett that he is not responsible for murdering Kirsten, for attacking Catherine, or for raping Ann and recommends that they turn Royce in to the police. Royce ends up stabbed after murdering both of his accomplices. He then assumes a disguise to hide from the police in Hebden Bridge.
6	"Episode Six"	Tim Fywell	Sally Wainwright	3 June 2014	8.78
Catherine visits Nevison at his work and tells him about Ann being raped by Royce. Nevison is devastated but agrees with Catherine that Helen doesn't need to know. Clare invites family and friends to a birthday party for an acquiescing Catherine, but tensions rise when Daniel lets slip some information about her now-deceased daughter and Royce's relationship thereby implying that Catherine's assessment of Becky's rape leading to her suicide may be incorrect. Cowgill is shot dead the day before he is to enter witness protection with the police assuming that he was killed by someone involved in the drug trade. Royce camps in an unoccupied narrowboat and tracks down Ryan cycling alone on his way home from school. Royce takes him back to the boat for a chat, but later Ryan invites along a friend for a visit the next day, which Clare finds out via his friend's mother. On the following day, Royce plans to kill himself and Ryan, but Catherine spots her grandson's bicycle outside the boat and finally apprehends Royce after hearing Ryan scream for help.

=== Series 2 (2016) ===
No. in series	Title	Directed by	Written by	Original release date	Viewers (millions)
7	"Episode One"	Sally Wainwright	Sally Wainwright	9 February 2016	9.75
Whilst investigating a case of sheep rustling, Catherine discovers the decomposed body of Lynn Dewhurst, Tommy Lee Royce's mother. Dewhurst was raped and murdered some weeks before, with the time of death unable to be precisely determined. To her irritation, Catherine is treated as a suspect in Dewhurst's murder because of her relation to Royce, and Catherine having threatened her after an altercation about Ryan. She is asked to provide alibis for the times of death of two other murders in circumstances similar to Dewhurst's. In the meantime, she is helping Ann Gallagher, recently recruited as a PCSO. Police begin to suspect a serial killer is behind the murders, and Detective Superintendent Andy Shepherd and Detective Inspector Jodie Shackleton are called in to take charge of the case. An imprisoned Tommy Lee Royce is informed of his mother's death, and is consoled by a female visitor to whom he accuses Catherine of the murder. Clare bumps into old friend Neil Ackroyd, who has recently moved to Hebden Bridge and works in the local corner shop, and Catherine takes in her son Daniel after he is thrown out by his wife; as a result, he and Ryan begin to form a bond. Detective Sergeant John Wadsworth tries to break up with his girlfriend Vicky Fleming after she unexpectedly turns up at his family home. During a last drink together, John is drugged and wakes up the following morning without any memory of the previous evening. Later that day, Fleming threatens to blackmail John unless he either pays her a monthly ransom or leaves his wife and children.
8	"Episode Two"	Sally Wainwright	Sally Wainwright	16 February 2016	9.16
Whilst remaining a suspect in the Lynn Dewhurst investigation, Catherine successfully rescues 21 female trafficking victims. One of them, Ilinka, is given refuge with Catherine’s neighbour Winnie. With vital information on those behind the trafficking, Ilinka reluctantly speaks to the police, and the identity of one of the murder victims is revealed. After talking with Ilinka, Andy Shepherd tells Catherine that she fears she has been followed, and security features are installed in Winnie's house. Tommy Lee Royce is given permission to attend his mother's funeral accompanied by prison guards. The woman who visited Royce in prison also attends, she is Frances Drummond, who is now employed as a teaching assistant at Ryan's school. Catherine also turns up with the intention of goading Royce, Frances discreetly makes him aware that Catherine is there, prompting an explosive foul-mouthed and violent reaction from Royce who believes Catherine killed his mother. Despite being handcuffed, Royce has to be physically restrained to the floor by several prison officers as he tries to go for Catherine. Royce is furiously escorted away as Catherine's boss looks on angrily at her for coming anywhere near the funeral; she then leaves and goes to Becky's grave. Under the pretence of having left his wife, John visits Vicky Fleming to encourage her to delete the images of him. Things eventually turn violent as he tries to recover the photos himself, John ends up strangling Vicky in the heat of the moment. Clare and Neil begin to develop a romantic relationship and learn that they are both recovering alcoholics, but Clare relapses at Helen's wake after Catherine leaves her there to attend Lynn Dewhurst's funeral. They end up arguing outside their house, and Catherine follows her as there has been a series of deaths involving prostitutes and vulnerable women.
9	"Episode Three"	Neasa Hardiman	Sally Wainwright	23 February 2016	9.18
Catherine reconciles with Clare, but is instructed by her superiors to see a therapist. Vicky's body is discovered (and her identity uncovered by Ann), and it is revealed John burned down Vicky's flat and mutilated her in order to stage the murder as the work of the unknown serial killer. He also confesses to Ann that his wife has been having an affair. Catherine is called to the site of the apparent suicide of one of Ilinka's slave-masters, which Ilinka suggests is murder. Frances Drummond begins to groom Ryan in his reading classes, encouraging him to build a relationship with his father, and continues to visit Tommy Lee Royce in prison.
10	"Episode Four"	Neasa Hardiman	Sally Wainwright	1 March 2016	9.20
Catherine interviews a prostitute who has survived being attacked and raped by Sean Balmforth, who is subsequently arrested and charged with the murders of Fleming, Dewhurst, and two other prostitutes. He later denies knowing or coming into contact with any of the four women. Ryan receives a lavish Scalextric set for his birthday, supposedly from his father, which Catherine furiously throws away. Frances later suggests to Ryan that the present from his father was an indication of Royce begging for forgiveness. On a visit, Royce instructs Frances to murder Catherine. Daryl Garrs, a vulnerable young farmer, is arrested for assaulting three men who provoked him at a local shop. Meanwhile, John's wife throws him out, and Neil tells Clare he knew Vicky Fleming and was "humiliated" and blackmailed by her.
11	"Episode Five"	Sally Wainwright	Sally Wainwright	8 March 2016	9.10
Sean is released after another body is found during his remand, and the investigation reopens. Catherine is forced to arrest Neil because of drunken behaviour in public, and he later apologises and plans to take good care of Clare. Catherine discovers that Frances bought and delivered the birthday present and is encouraging Ryan to contact his father. Daryl Garrs confesses to his mother Alison that he is responsible for the killings and she says they've had a "strange life". Soon afterwards, to protect him from inevitable prison, Alison fatally shoots him.
12	"Episode Six"	Sally Wainwright	Sally Wainwright	15 March 2016	9.80
Catherine visits the Garrs' farm, and finds Daryl dead and Alison barely alive after a diazepam overdose. Alison confesses she is behind her son's death, whereupon Catherine reluctantly arrests her. Alison also tells of Daryl's insistence that he was not responsible for the murder of Vicky Fleming. Later in hospital she tells Catherine that her father abused her and thus fathered Daryl. The police discover that Frances Drummond falsely used the identity of her deceased sister, Cecily Wealand. She is later arrested for fraud, with Catherine vowing to bring her to justice for her targeting of Ryan. Catherine visits Drummond and tells her side of the story, and in the process sees that Drummond has been misled and indoctrinated by Tommy Lee Royce, to the point where Drummond believes they are engaged. Piecing together Neil's account of Vicky Fleming's blackmailing, information from Ann about John's strange behaviour, and an incident of violence from John's wife's boyfriend, Catherine determines John is the killer. When she approaches him he flees to the edge of a bridge, where he confesses to the murder, but jumps to his death soon afterwards. To tie up the series, Drummond learns that Royce is engaged to several other admirers, and Royce is banned from receiving visitors in prison; nonetheless, a letter written and posted by Ryan reaches him.

=== Series 3 (2023) ===
No. in series	Title	Directed by	Written by	Original release date	UK viewers (millions) 7 day
13	"Episode One"	Patrick Harkins and Sally Wainwright	Sally Wainwright	1 January 2023	7.90
Catherine is called to a drained reservoir near Ripponden, and identifies a skeleton. Royce is interviewed and tells the police who ordered the killing; it isn't the Knezevic brothers, to the frustration of the police. Pharmacist Faisal Bhatti is illegally supplying prescription drugs and is blackmailed by violent drug dealers from the Knezevic gang. One of Bhatti's clients, Joanna Hepworth, is the abused wife of Rob Hepworth, Ryan's PE teacher, who reports her for possession. Ryan has been secretly visiting Royce, and Catherine wants to know who is helping him.
14	"Episode Two"	Patrick Harkins and Sally Wainwright	Sally Wainwright	8 January 2023	8.52
Catherine finds out Clare and her partner Neil are taking Ryan to see Royce in prison, and follows them and confronts Clare. Hepworth accuses Ryan of vandalising his car but there is no evidence. With Joanna desperate to leave Mr. Hepworth, she blackmails Bhatti into helping her, claiming her husband knows about him. Joanna wants him to arrange a place for her to live, or help her kill her husband.
15	"Episode Three"	Patrick Harkins and Sally Wainwright	Sally Wainwright	15 January 2023	8.78
Clare tells Catherine that Ryan had been writing to Royce since he was ten, and started seeing him in the last year. Catherine confronts Ryan and asks him to move out, explaining what Royce did. A blind woman jumps out of her high rise apartment window after being exploited by organised crime, which attracts unwanted attention for a gang member. Faisal wants to proceed with the plan to kill Mr. Hepworth, but after Joanna backs out and confesses that Hepworth does not actually know about him, he kills her in a fit of rage.
16	"Episode Four"	Fergus O'Brien	Sally Wainwright	22 January 2023	9.03
Knezevic tells two of his gang he has a job for them; they create a disturbance allowing Royce to escape from the court dock and flee Leeds on a bicycle. A missing persons officer visits the Hepworths' house and Rob later discovers Joanna's body in a suitcase in the garage.
17	"Episode Five"	Fergus O'Brien	Sally Wainwright	29 January 2023	9.66
Royce is taken to a safe house. He plans on moving abroad and taking Ryan with him, a plan organised by Darius Knezevic. Hepworth reports finding Joanna's body to the police. Catherine suspects he was involved in her death. With Royce on the run, Catherine's family have to go into hiding. Royce and Ryan are still in contact via their games consoles, and Royce asks if Ryan wants to go away with him.
18	"Episode Six"	Fergus O'Brien	Sally Wainwright	5 February 2023	11.08
The police are closing in on Royce. The Knezevics double-cross Royce, who barely escapes after killing Zeljko and his associates. When interviewed by the police, Ryan reveals Royce has been in contact, while Catherine's stirred-up grief for Becky leads her on a collision course with Tommy. After an emotional final showdown between the pair, Royce fatally injures himself by setting himself on fire. Later, at Becky's grave, Catherine receives news that Tommy has died. Meanwhile, Hepworth is taken in for questioning. On her final day on duty, Catherine connects some leads that allows her colleagues to solve Joanna's murder.

== Ratings ==
Happy Valley : UK viewers per episode (millions)

Series	Episode number					
Series	1	2	3	4	5	6
1	8.64	7.62	7.69	8.33	8.10	8.78
2	9.75	9.16	9.18	9.20	9.10	9.80
3	7.90	8.52	8.78	9.03	9.66	11.08

Audience measurement performed by Broadcasters' Audience Research BoardBARB
