= Happy Valley (TV series) =

British crime drama television series (2014–2023)

- Genre: Crime drama; Police procedural
- Created by: Sally Wainwright
- Written by: Sally Wainwright
- Directed by: Sally Wainwright; Euros Lyn; Tim Fywell; Neasa Hardiman; Patrick Harkins; Fergus O'Brien
- Starring: Sarah Lancashire; Siobhan Finneran; James Norton; Charlie Murphy; George Costigan; Rhys Connah
- Opening theme: "Trouble Town" by Jake Bugg
- Ending theme: "Trouble Town"
- Composer: Ben Foster
- Country of origin: United Kingdom
- Original language: English
- No. of series: 3
- No. of episodes: 18 (list of episodes)

Production
- Executive producers: Nicola Shindler; Sally Wainwright; Matthew Read; Will Johnston; Faith Penhale; Rayan Salvi; Sarah Lancashire
- Producers: Karen Lewis (series 1); Juliet Charlesworth (series 2); Jessica Taylor (series 3)
- Production locations: Calder Valley (Hebden Bridge, Sowerby Bridge, Mytholmroyd, Heptonstall, Todmorden, Halifax)
- Running time: 60–70 minutes
- Production companies: Red Production Company (series 1–2); Lookout Point TV (series 3)

Original release
- Network: BBC One
- Release: 29 April 2014 – 5 February 2023

Happy Valley is an English crime drama television series, set and filmed in the Calder Valley, West Yorkshire. Starring Sarah Lancashire, James Norton and Siobhan Finneran, it was written and created by Sally Wainwright and directed by Wainwright, Euros Lyn and Tim Fywell. The first series began on BBC One on 29 April 2014, the second on 9 February 2016, and the third and final series on 1 January 2023. It won the 2015 BAFTA Award for Best Drama Series, and won another BAFTA for Best Drama for the second series.

== Premise ==
=== Series 1 ===
Catherine Cawood is a divorced police sergeant living with her sister, Clare, in West Yorkshire. Catherine's son Daniel does not speak to her, and she remains haunted by the suicide of her daughter Becky eight years previously. Becky's son, Ryan, who was born as a result of rape, is now being raised by Catherine and Clare.

Catherine soon discovers that Tommy Lee Royce, whom she holds responsible for her daughter's rape and suicide, has been released from prison after serving time for drugs offences. Catherine becomes consumed by the idea of confronting him, unaware that Tommy is involved in a criminal organisation with the intention of kidnapping Ann Gallagher, the daughter of a wealthy businessman, for ransom.

=== Series 2 ===
18 months after the first series, Catherine is back at work and has been awarded the Queen's Police Medal for gallantry for rescuing Ann from Royce, who is serving a life sentence in prison. When Royce's mother is found dead, Catherine is implicated in her murder amongst several others. Whilst trying to prove her innocence, she is tasked with investigating a human trafficking operation linked to the serial killings.

Meanwhile, senior Homicide and Major Enquiry Team (HMET) officers DS Andy Shepard and DI Jodie Shackleton begin to suspect that the serial killer's supposed fourth victim, Victoria Fleming, was murdered by someone else. Gradually, their investigation leads them toward Victoria's actual killer: DS John Wadsworth, whom Fleming had blackmailed.

Catherine's now 10-year-old grandson, Ryan, gets along well with a new teaching assistant, Frances Drummond, secretly a prison groupie infatuated with Royce. As the court has forbidden Royce from having any contact with Ryan, he uses Drummond to try to build a relationship with Ryan and get revenge on Catherine. Ryan increasingly concerns his family by asking questions about his father; even suggesting Royce should be forgiven.

=== Series 3 ===
Six years after the events of the second series, Catherine is approaching retirement age and has plans to go on a hiking expedition to the Himalayas. She is soon called to investigate the discovery of human remains found near a reservoir. Tommy Lee Royce, who has since been transferred to a prison in Sheffield, is questioned by police in relation to the case.

Meanwhile, 16-year-old Ryan — having sent Royce a letter at the end of the second series — has secretly been visiting him in prison with help from Clare and her new partner, Neil, unbeknownst to Catherine. When Catherine finds out, she temporarily blocks contact with the three of them and gives Ryan an ultimatum to stop visiting his father. Ryan is also in conflict with his PE teacher, Rob Hepworth, who has kicked him off the football team following accusations of misconduct.

At home, Hepworth is physically and mentally abusive towards his wife Joanna, who has developed an addiction to prescription drugs and is receiving them illegally from her pharmacist, Faisal Bhatti. The latter, in turn, is blackmailed by a gang of violent drug dealers, who demand money in exchange for his family's continued safety.

== Episodes ==
Series	Episodes	Originally released		Average UK viewers (millions)
Series	Episodes	First released	Last released	Average UK viewers (millions)
1	6	29 April 2014	3 June 2014	8.19
2	6	9 February 2016	15 March 2016	9.36
3	6	1 January 2023	5 February 2023	9.16

== Cast ==
=== Main cast ===
- Sarah Lancashire as Sgt. Catherine Cawood
- Siobhan Finneran as Clare Cartwright, Catherine's sister and a recovering heroin addict
- Charlie Murphy as Ann Gallagher, Nevison Gallagher's daughter
- James Norton as Tommy Lee Royce, a drug dealer and Ryan's biological father
- George Costigan as Nevison Gallagher, a local entrepreneur
- Rhys Connah as Ryan Cawood, Catherine's grandson

=== Series 1 ===
- Steve Pemberton as Kevin Weatherill, the accountant for Nevison Gallagher Associates
- Joe Armstrong as Ashley Cowgill, a local drug dealer
- Sophie Rundle as PC Kirsten McAskill, Catherine's protégé
- Adam Long as Lewis Whippey, an employee of Ashley
- Adam Nagaitis as Brett McKendrick, Lewis' friend

=== Series 2 ===
- Kevin Doyle as DS John Wadsworth
- Amelia Bullmore as Vicky Fleming, John's mistress
- Julie Hesmondhalgh as Amanda Wadsworth, John's wife
- Katherine Kelly as DI Jodie Shackleton
- Shirley Henderson as Frances Drummond / Cecily Wealand, a prison groupie for Tommy Lee Royce posing as Ryan's teaching assistant
- Matthew Lewis as Sean Balmforth, a local criminal

=== Series 3 ===
- Mark Stanley as Rob Hepworth, one of Ryan's teachers and a control freak
- Mollie Winnard as Joanna Hepworth, Rob's medication-addicted wife
- Amit Shah as Faisal Bhatti, a pharmacist

=== Recurring ===
- Ishia Bennison as Joyce Metcalfe, a civilian police employee
- Con O'Neill as Neil Ackroyd, Clare's partner
- Jill Baker as Helen Gallagher, Nevison's wife
- Karl Davies as Daniel Cawood, Catherine's estranged son
- Derek Riddell as Richard Cawood, Catherine's ex-husband and a journalist
- Ramon Tikaram as Chief Superintendent Praveen Badal
- Rick Warden as Inspector Mike Taylor
- Vincent Franklin as Detective Superintendent Andy Shephard
- Susan Lynch as Alison Garrs, a local farmer

== Production ==
On 22 November 2012, Ben Stephenson announced the commissioning of Happy Valley for BBC One. The programme was written by Sally Wainwright, produced by Karen Lewis, and directed by Euros Lyn, Sally Wainwright and Tim Fywell.

Filming began in the Calder Valley in November 2013. Locations in the area included Todmorden, Luddenden, Mytholmroyd, Bradford, Keighley, Sowerby Bridge, Hebden Bridge, and Heptonstall. Huddersfield, Halifax, Leeds and other West Yorkshire cities are mentioned, though not main filming locations. A former police station (Station Road, Sowerby Bridge) was used for some scenes, and additional filming took place at North Light Film Studios at Brookes Mill, Huddersfield.

The name "Happy Valley" is what local police in the Calder Valley call the area because of its drug problem.

In the first episode of series one, Ryan points out to Catherine, visiting her daughter Becky's grave in the next row, that visitors have left pens at Sylvia Plath's grave.

A second series was commissioned on 18 August 2014. Filming began in August 2015, and the first episode was broadcast on 9 February 2016. The second series was written by Wainwright, produced by Lewis, and directed by Lyn and Wainwright. Catherine's workplace is a former police station in Sowerby Bridge, and her home and local pub (two other main filming locations) are based in Hebden Bridge. The prison scenes were filmed at Oakham Enterprise Park in Rutland, which was HMP Ashwell until its closure.

The main character, Sergeant Cawood, is mentioned in the third episode of the fifth series of Last Tango in Halifax, which aired on BBC One on 9 March 2020. Wainwright also created and wrote this series, set in Halifax and starring Sarah Lancashire.

In October 2020, Wainwright confirmed that there would be a third series and that she was in the "early stages" of writing it. Filming for the third series began in January 2022.

After watching the first three episodes of the season, Wainwright didn't like some directorial choices made by Patrick Harkins and decided to reshoot some scenes herself, hence her credit as a director, but not co-director, on those episodes.

== Reception ==
The first episode aired on 29 April 2014 at 21:00, receiving 8.64 million viewers, as the second most watched show of the week (commencing 28 April 2014) for BBC One. The BBC reported that the show received an average consolidated audience of 8.21 million viewers over six episodes and an additional 8.1 million requests for the show on BBC iPlayer. Radio Times called Happy Valley a "word-of-mouth hit" which "steadily became a success outside the normal audience for the slot and channel."

After episode one aired, Ofcom received four complaints under the category "violence and dangerous behaviour", but they did not pursue the matter.

Reviews from the media have been overwhelmingly positive, and the show has received a 100% rating on Rotten Tomatoes. On Metacritic, seasons one, two and three of the show received ratings of 83, 84 and 93, respectively.

However, some reviewers have criticised the show for its graphic content, especially in episodes three and four of season one, while others have noted the ubiquitous typecasting of male characters as either weak or criminals.

In response to the criticism, Happy Valley's creator-writer, Wainwright, defended the show as "a quality, well-written drama" and stated, "Judging by the amount of email, texts, tweets I've had, I don't think anyone is asking me to apologise." In an interview with the Radio Times, Wainwright said the level of violence had been carefully considered, and it was done responsibly, by showing the psychological and physical damage suffered by Catherine.

Other critics have praised the show. Vicky Frost of The Guardian wrote: "To get hung up on the violence of this BBC1 kidnap drama misses the point. It is beautifully written by Sally Wainwright, draws an astonishing performance from Sarah Lancashire—and between them, they have created something truly unmissable." Gerard O'Donovan of The Telegraph called Happy Valley "complex, thrilling and brilliantly written and acted", and "one of the best watches of 2014". In September 2019, The Guardian ranked the show 11th on its list of the 100 best TV shows of the 21st century, calling it "a corrective to cliché-ridden and frequently blokey police procedurals", and one that "pulsated with poignant realness".

The final episode of series 3, the final series, garnered much praise from critics. Lucy Mangan, writing for The Guardian, called the episode as "[b]rutal, tender, funny, compelling and heartbreaking"; Anita Singh, reviewing for The Daily Telegraph, rated the episode 5/5 stars and claimed, "Happy Valley sounds so bleak on paper, with its storylines about drugs, rape and murder. But at its core is the love that Cawood has for her family. Wainwright gave us what we wanted: a happy ending for a character who truly deserves it"; Peter Stanford writing in the Telegraph highlighted the various religious themes, with Cawood taking on "the appearance of a living saint" amidst the evil and misery of Happy Valley. Positive reviews were also published by The Times and I, who rated the episode 5/5 stars.

After the final episode aired, Labour Shadow Home Secretary Yvette Cooper promised to increase the number of community police officers by 13,000, citing Catherine Cawood as a positive influence for these officers.

== International ==
Country	Channel
Australia	Stan, Binge, BBC First
Canada	CBC Gem (series 1–2), Acorn TV/AMC+ (series 3)
Croatia	HRT2
Czech Republic	ČT1
Denmark	DR
Estonia	ETV
Finland	Yle TV1
France	Canal+
Germany	WDR
Greece	Cosmote Series
Iceland	RUV
Ireland	RTÉ
Netherlands	Netflix, BBC First
New Zealand	TVNZ
Norway	NRK
Poland	Ale Kino+
Portugal	RTP1, RTP2
Sweden	SVT1
Spain	Movistar+
Belgium	Netflix
India	Netflix
Italy	Sky Investigation
Korea	Netflix
United States	Netflix (series 1–2), Acorn TV/AMC+/BBC America (series 3)

== Awards and nominations ==
=== Series One ===
Association	Category	Nominee(s)	Result
BAFTA Television Awards	Best Actress	Sarah Lancashire	Nominated
BAFTA Television Awards	Best Supporting Actor	James Norton	Nominated
BAFTA Television Awards	Best Drama Series	Happy Valley	Won
BAFTA Television Craft Awards	Best Director: Fiction	Euros Lyn	Nominated
BAFTA Television Craft Awards	Best Writer: Drama	Sally Wainwright	Won
Banff Rockie Awards	Best Procedural Drama	Happy Valley	Pending
Broadcast Awards	Best Drama Series or Serial	Happy Valley	Won
Broadcasting Press Guild Awards	Best Actress	Sarah Lancashire	Nominated
Broadcasting Press Guild Awards	Best Drama Series	Happy Valley	Nominated
Broadcasting Press Guild Awards	Breakthrough Award	James Norton	Nominated
Broadcasting Press Guild Awards	Writer's Award	Sally Wainwright	Won
Crime Thriller Awards	Best TV Drama	Happy Valley	Won
Crime Thriller Awards	Best Leading Actor	Steve Pemberton	Nominated
Crime Thriller Awards	Best Leading Actress	Sarah Lancashire	Nominated
Crime Thriller Awards	Best Supporting Actor	James Norton	Won
Edgar Awards	Best Episode in a TV Series	Sally Wainwright ("Episode 1")	Won
Monte-Carlo Television Festival	Best Drama Series	Happy Valley	Won
Monte-Carlo Television Festival	Best Actress in a Drama Series	Sarah Lancashire	Won
National Television Awards	Best Drama Performance	Sarah Lancashire	Nominated
RTS Programme Awards	Best Actor (Female)	Sarah Lancashire	Won
RTS Programme Awards	Best Drama Series	Happy Valley	Nominated
RTS Programme Awards	Best Writer: Drama	Sally Wainwright	Nominated
RTS Programme Awards	Best Editing: Drama	Jamie Pearson	Nominated
RTS North-West Awards	Best Single Drama or Drama Series	Happy Valley	Nominated
RTS North-West Awards	Best Performance in a Single Drama or Drama Series (Male)	Steve Pemberton	Nominated
RTS North-West Awards	Best Performance in a Single Drama or Drama Series (Female)	Sarah Lancashire	Won
RTS North-West Awards	Best Script Writer	Sally Wainwright	Nominated
RTS North-West Awards	Best Production (Craft)	Red Production Company	Nominated
RTS North-West Awards	Best Post-Production (Craft)	'production team' ("Episode 4")	Nominated
Satellite Awards	Best Mini-Series Made for Television	Happy Valley	Nominated
Satellite Awards	Best Actress in a Mini-Series or Motion Picture Made for Television	Sarah Lancashire	Nominated
South Bank Sky Arts Awards	Best TV Drama	Happy Valley	Pending
TV Choice Awards	Best New Drama	Happy Valley	Won
TV Choice Awards	Best Actress	Sarah Lancashire	Won
Writer's Guild of Great Britain Awards	Best TV Drama – Long Form	Sally Wainwright	Won

=== Series Two ===
Association	Category	Nominee(s)	Result
BAFTA Television Awards	Best Actress	Sarah Lancashire	Won
BAFTA Television Awards	Best Supporting Actress	Siobhan Finneran	Nominated
BAFTA Television Awards	Best Drama Series	Happy Valley	Won
BAFTA Television Craft Awards	Best Writer: Drama	Sally Wainwright	Won
Broadcast Awards	Best Drama Series or Serial	Happy Valley	Nominated
Broadcasting Press Guild Awards	Best Actress	Sarah Lancashire	Nominated
Broadcasting Press Guild Awards	Best Actor	James Norton	Nominated
Broadcasting Press Guild Awards	Writer's Award	Sally Wainwright	Nominated
Irish Film & Television Academy Awards	Best Supporting Actress in a Television Drama	Charlie Murphy	Won
National Television Awards	Best Drama	Happy Valley	Nominated
National Television Awards	Best Drama Performance	Sarah Lancashire	Won
Peabody Awards	Excellence in Entertainment Television	Happy Valley	Won
RTS Programme Awards	Best Drama Series	Happy Valley	Won
RTS Programme Awards	Best Writer: Drama	Sally Wainwright	Won
RTS North-West Awards	Best Single Drama or Drama Series	Happy Valley	Nominated
RTS North-West Awards	Best Performance in a Single Drama or Drama Series (Male)	Kevin Doyle	Won
RTS North-West Awards	Best Performance in a Single Drama or Drama Series (Female)	Sarah Lancashire	Won
RTS North-West Awards	Best Script Writer	Sally Wainwright	Nominated
RTS North-West Awards	Best Production (Craft)	Red Production Company	Won
RTS North-West Awards	Best Post-Production (Craft)	'production team' ("Episode 4")	Nominated
Satellite Awards	Best Actress in a Series, Drama/Genre	Sarah Lancashire	Nominated
South Bank Sky Arts Awards	Best TV Drama	Happy Valley	Won
TV Choice Awards	Best Drama Series	Happy Valley	Nominated
TV Choice Awards	Best Actress	Sarah Lancashire	Won

=== Series Three ===
Association	Category	Nominee(s)	Result
BAFTA Television Awards	Best Actress	Sarah Lancashire	Won
BAFTA Television Awards	Best Supporting Actor	Amit Shah	Nominated
BAFTA Television Awards	Best Supporting Actress	Siobhan Finneran	Nominated
BAFTA Television Awards	Best Drama Series	Happy Valley	Nominated
BAFTA Television Awards	Memorable Moment	"Catherine Cawood and Tommy Lee Royce's final kitchen showdown"	Won
BAFTA Television Craft Awards	Best Writer: Drama	Sally Wainwright	Nominated
BAFTA Television Craft Awards	Best Editing: Fiction	Joe Carey	Nominated

== Home media ==
BBC Shop released Happy Valley series one on DVD, in regions two and four, on 16 June 2014. The DVD includes two discs, featuring 351 minutes' worth of footage, and has an age certificate of 15. All six episodes of the series were released on iTunes, both in standard and high definition.

On 20 August 2014, the series was further released on Netflix in Canada and the US, marketed as a "Netflix Original". However, it departed Netflix in March 2020.

In the summer of 2016, series one of Happy Valley was released on Netflix in the UK and is currently repeated on the channel W. A year later, series two was released on Netflix in the UK.

On 26 October 2021, the first two series were released on AMC+ in Canada and the US, coinciding with the announcement AMC+ would co-produce a third series with BBC One. On 23 March 2023, AMC Networks announced the third series would premiere on 22 May 2023 on AMC+, Acorn TV and BBC America, with the first series being made available on Acorn TV that day, and the second on 3 April.
