= Portsmouth railway station =

Portsmouth railway station may refer to:

- Portsmouth Harbour railway station in Hampshire, England
- Portsmouth and Southsea railway station in Hampshire, England
- Portsmouth Arms railway station in Devon, England
- Portsmouth railway station (West Yorkshire), also known as Portsmouth (Lancs) - it was formerly in Lancashire, England and now located in West Yorkshire
