= Cornholme railway station =

Disused railway station in West Yorkshire, England

Cornholme

General information
- Location: Cornholme, Calderdale; England
- Coordinates: 53.732164°N 2.133200°W
- Grid reference: SD913262
- Platforms: 2

Other information
- Status: Disused

History
- Original company: Lancashire and Yorkshire Railway
- Pre-grouping: Lancashire and Yorkshire Railway
- Post-grouping: London, Midland and Scottish Railway

Key dates
- July 1878: Station opened
- 26 September 1938: Station closed
Location

Cornholme railway station served the village of Cornholme in West Yorkshire, England on the Copy Pit line. The station was opened by the Lancashire and Yorkshire Railway in July 1878 (nearly thirty years after the line itself) and closed by the LMS on 26 September 1938. The line remains in use for passenger trains between York/Leeds and Blackpool, which run non-stop between Hebden Bridge and Burnley, and also for trains between Manchester and Blackburn, via Todmorden, utilising the reinstated Todmorden Curve.

With the re-opening of the Todmorden Curve, there is now a campaign to open a station again at Cornholme. The Campaign group CRAG (Cornholme Rail Action Group) have not stated where the new station would be located.

Preceding station	Historical railways	Following station
Portsmouth; Line open, station closed	L&YR; Copy Pit Line	Stansfield Hall; Line open, station closed
