= Portsmouth, West Yorkshire =

Village in West Yorkshire, England

Coordinates: 53.732°N 2.154°W

Portsmouth
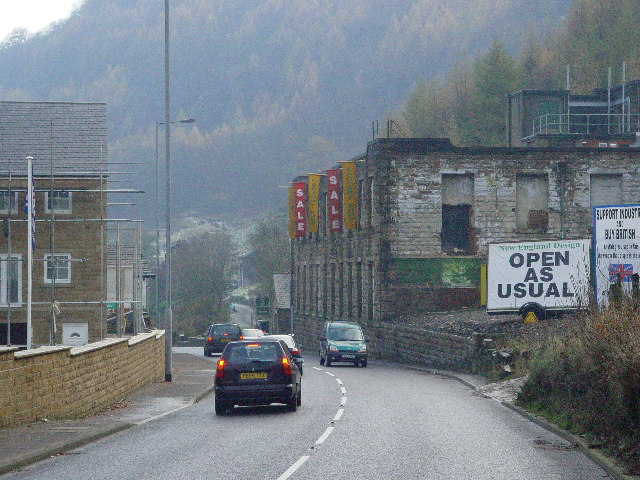
- On Burnley Road in Portsmouth, 2005

- Location within West Yorkshire
- OS grid reference: SD899262
- Civil parish: Todmorden
- Metropolitan borough: Calderdale
- Metropolitan county: West Yorkshire
- Region: Yorkshire and the Humber
- Country: England
- Sovereign state: United Kingdom
- Post town: TODMORDEN
- Postcode district: OL14
- Dialling code: 01706
- Police: West Yorkshire
- Fire: West Yorkshire
- Ambulance: Yorkshire
- UK Parliament: Calder Valley

Portsmouth is a village on the A646 road, in the civil parish of Todmorden, in the Calderdale district, in the county of West Yorkshire, England. Nearby settlements include the towns of Burnley and Todmorden and the village of Cornholme.

== History ==
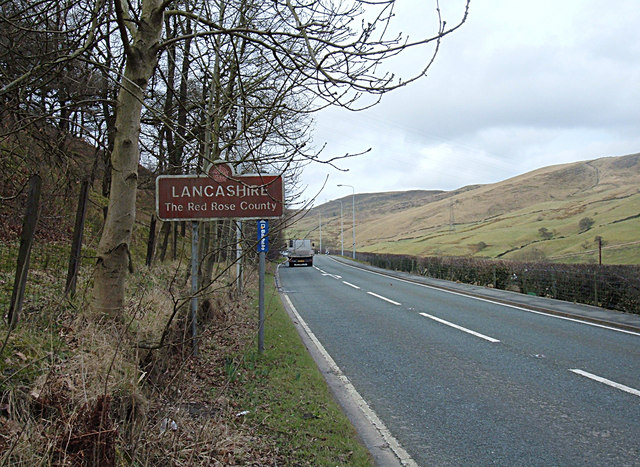
Current county boundary, west of the village in 2008

Though it was historically part of Lancashire, the many boundary changes in the area have resulted in the village now being part of Calderdale, West Yorkshire. In the 19th century it was in Cliviger township, Whalley parish, and the border to Yorkshire ran east of the place. For electoral purposes, Portsmouth was counted as part of parliamentary constituencies of Lancashire until 1917, and of the West Riding of Yorkshire from 1918.

The village had a railway station, which was opened in 1849 by the Manchester and Leeds Railway. It was renamed by British Rail to Portsmouth (Lancs) and closed on 7 July 1958.
