= Kirkthorpe Hydro =

Hydro-electric plant on the River Calder, England

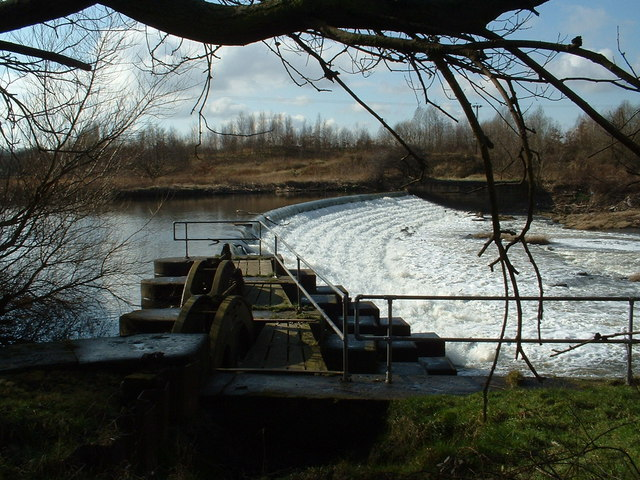

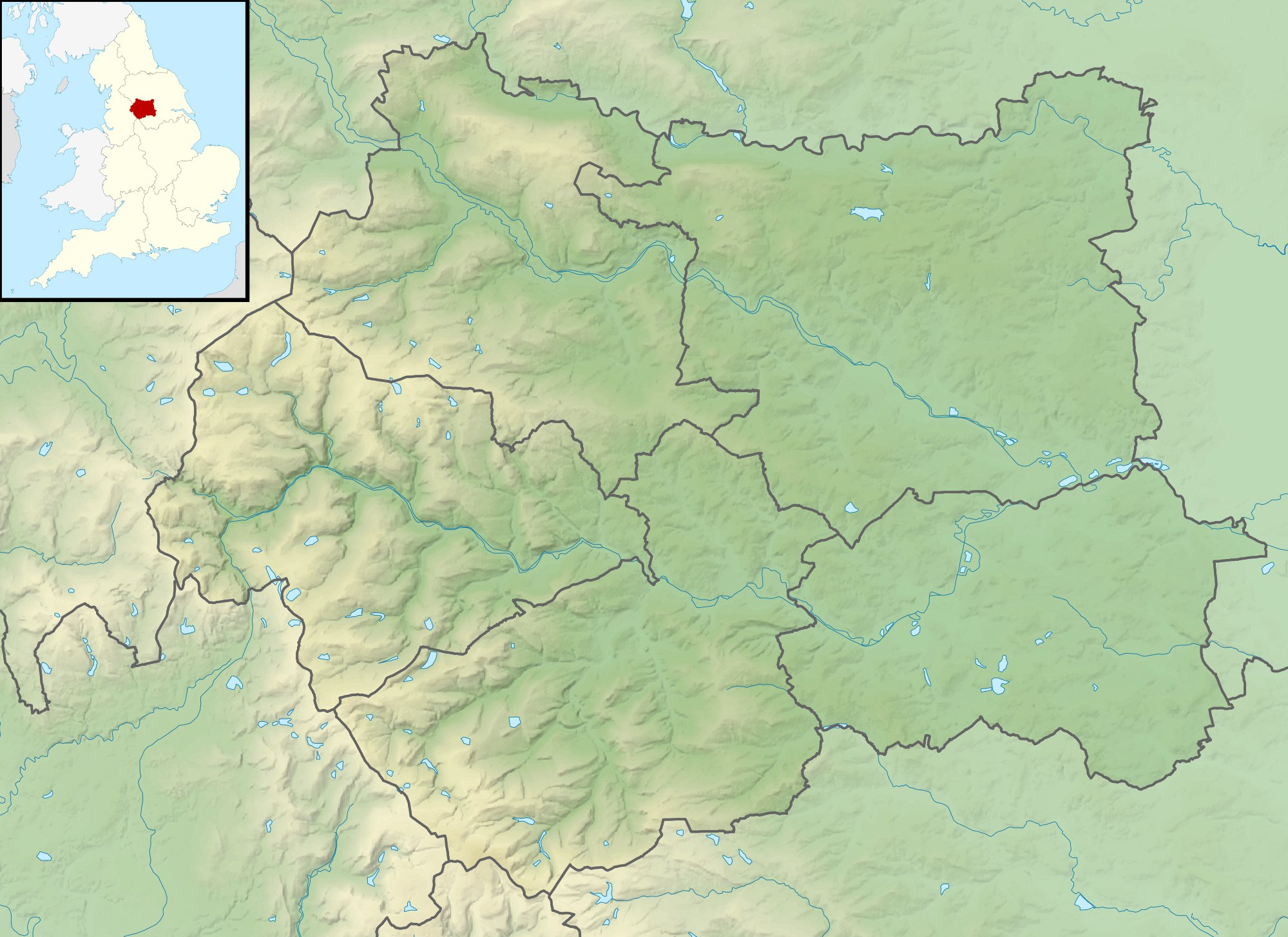
- Location within West Yorkshire
- Country: England
- Location: Kirkthorpe, Wakefield
- Coordinates: 53.6865°N 1.4597°W
- Purpose: Power
- Status: Operational
- Construction began: April 2016
- Opening date: March 2017
- Construction cost: £5.3 million ($7.6 million)

Power Station
- Type: Conventional
- Turbines: 1
- Annual generation: 500 kW

Kirkthorpe hydro is a hydroelectric generating plant located on the River Calder at Kirkthorpe Weir, 4 miles (6.4 km) east of the City of Wakefield in West Yorkshire, England. The plant was opened in 2017 and is expected to generate electricity for 100 years. Kirkthorpe Weir is the highest industrial weir in Yorkshire and has prevented fish passing upstream to spawn; the new hydro project has a fish pass built into it.

At a nameplate capacity of 500 kW, along with another plant at Brotherton on the River Aire, the plant is jointly the largest hydroelectric generator in Yorkshire.

== History ==
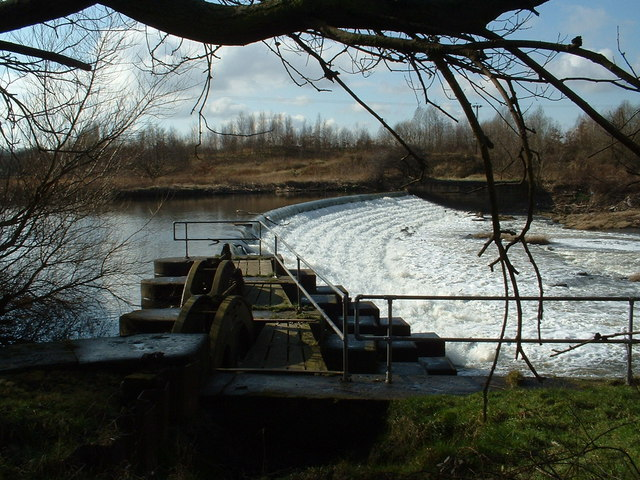
Kirkthorpe Weir (2005)

Kirkthorpe Weir, which is a grade II listed structure, has been an obstruction for fish passing up the River Calder since it was built in 1827. It is a 13 feet (4 m) drop weir which is the highest in Yorkshire, and was built to maintain a steady flow of water into the Aire and Calder Navigation which branches off just upstream of Kirkthorpe Weir on the left bank. Barn Energy proposed building a hydroelectric power station on Kirkthorpe Weir, with permission being granted by Wakefield Council, on whose land the power station is located. Work on the £5.3 million ($7.6 million) project was started in April 2016 and generation started in March 2017.

Special measures were taken to adopt a fish pass and a separate eel pass. The turbine channel has screen at both ends to prevent fish being sucked in from the top and also to stop larger fish entering from the bottom. The eel pass has a constant flow of water and is protected by overhead screens to prevent predation. The power station has a 500 kW capacity which will generate 2.3 million units of electricity per year, enough to power over 800 homes.

In 2019, the site was furnished with a 1,200 kWh lithium-ion battery. As the turbine is generating constantly with water running through the power station, the unused electricity is stored in the battery which can be released at a time when supplies are lower.

In 2019, Kirkthorpe Hydro along with Thrybergh Hydro, a sister project on the River Don also built by Barn Energy, were sold to JLEN in a £4.3 million deal.
