= Holme railway station (Lancashire) =

Disused railway station in Lancashire, England

Holme

General information
- Location: Holme Chapel, Burnley; England
- Coordinates: 53.7505°N 2.1931°W
- Grid reference: SD873282
- Platforms: 2

Other information
- Status: Disused

History
- Original company: Manchester and Leeds Railway
- Pre-grouping: Lancashire and Yorkshire Railway
- Post-grouping: London, Midland and Scottish Railway

Key dates
- 12 November 1849: Station opened
- 28 July 1930: Station closed
Location

Holme railway station served Holme Chapel on the Copy Pit line. The station closed in July 1930 and the line now serves as a non-stop route between Hebden Bridge and Burnley.

Preceding station	Historical railways	Following station
Towneley; Line open, station closed	L&YR; Copy Pit Line	Portsmouth; Line open, station closed
