= Pugneys Country Park =

Country park in West Yorkshire, England

Coordinates: 53.6565°N 1.5038°W

Children's adventure boat on the beach at Pugneys Country Park

Pugneys Country Park is a 250-acre (1.0 km^{2}) park located on the A636 between Wakefield, West Yorkshire, England and Junction 39 of the M1 motorway. It is a Local Nature Reserve.

The area was developed from a former opencast mine and a sand and gravel quarry and was opened to the public in 1985. It is overlooked by Sandal Castle.

The park comprises two lakes, which are both dedicated as a nature reserve.

Miniature railway

A 7 1/4 in (184 mm) gauge miniature railway runs round part of the larger lake, and cafeteria facilities are available.

The nature reserve is home to a large flock of non-breeding swans, with up to 100 in residence at any time.

The park is now managed as a countryside site by Wakefield Council, with water sports and fishing no longer permitted.

The lakes serve as a flood defence by providing an overflow from the River Calder.
