= Burnley Wood =

District of Burnley, England

Coordinates: 53.7821°N 2.2361°W

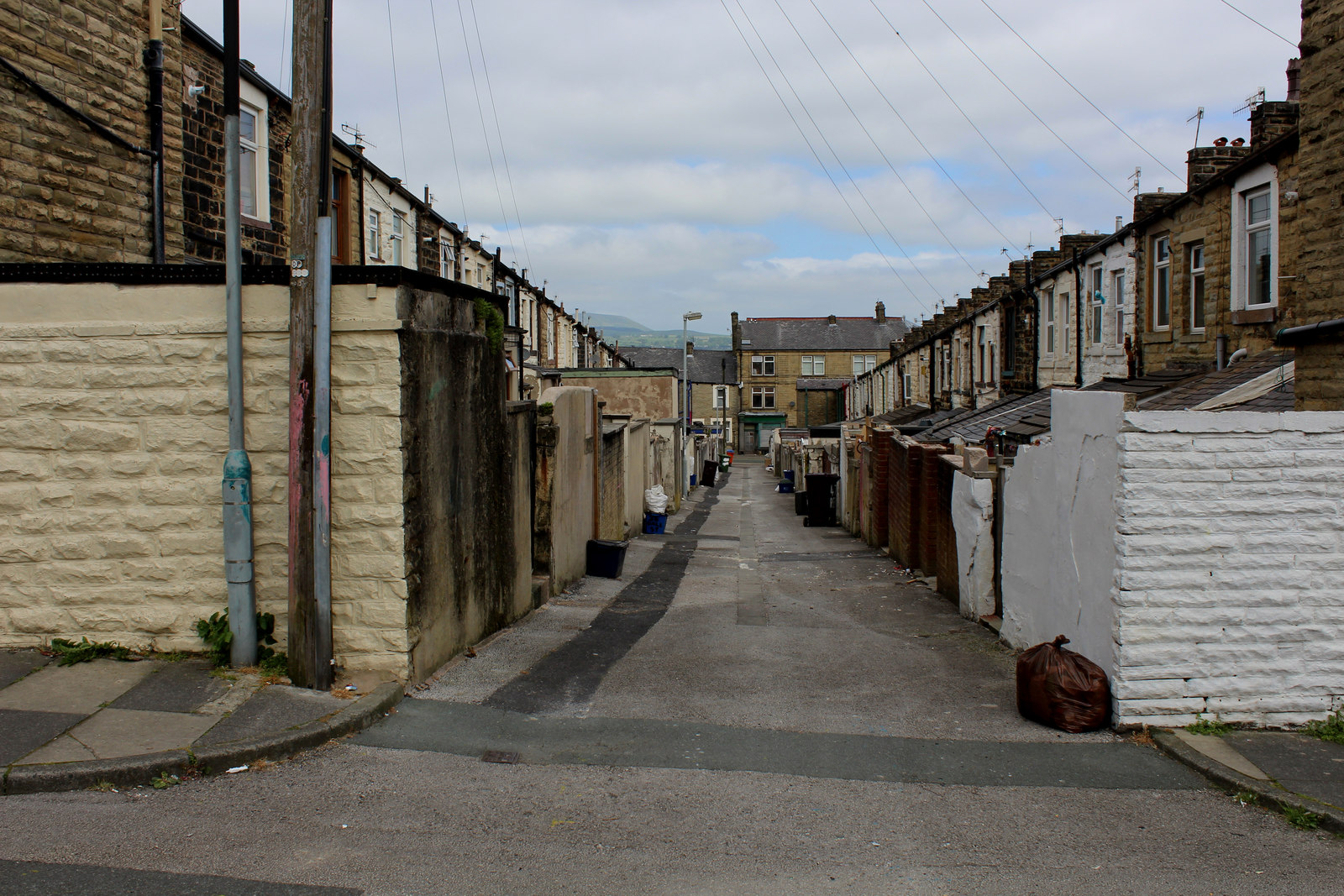
- Back Alley behind Reed Street

- Location in the Borough of Burnley district Location within Lancashire
- District: Burnley
- Shire county: Lancashire
- Region: North West
- Country: England
- Sovereign state: United Kingdom
- Police: Lancashire
- Fire: Lancashire
- Ambulance: North West

Burnley Wood is a district and former electoral ward of Burnley, Lancashire, England. In broad terms the area lies between Parliament Street in the north and Hufling Lane in the south, and from the railway in the west to Todmorden Road in the east. Based on historic definitions of the ward boundary, Burnley Wood could also be defined as including the more affluent areas around the Woodgrove Road area to the east of Todmorden Road, Brooklands Road to the south and the area north of Parliament Street as far as the River Calder. Historically the district was located in the parish and township of Habergham Eaves, separated from the adjacent Burnley township, later Borough by the Calder before being incorporated into the County Borough of Burnley in 1894.

== History ==
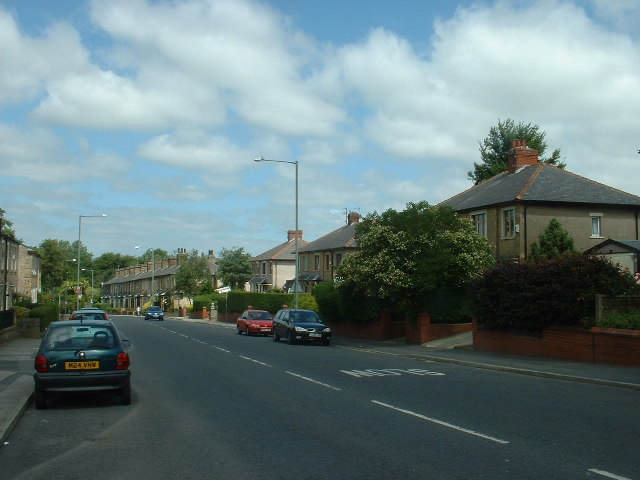
Todmorden Road, a de facto eastern boundary of Burnley Wood, looking north

In the sixteenth-century, as the name suggests, the area was mostly covered by rough moorland and woodland, with a scattering of farmsteads on the outskirts of Burnley. These included Whittaker Farm, at the junction of the present day Hufling Lane and Todmorden Road; Mosely Farm in what is now Glebe Street; Hollin Greave, at the junction of Brunswick Street and Hollingreave Road; and Hufling Hall. The latter is a late seventeenth century farmhouse. It is a grade II listed building and is sandwiched between late nineteenth century housing. Todmorden Road, became a turnpike road in 1817 and became a route of the Burnley Corporation Tramway in 1910.

From 1673 to 1819, the majority of Burnley Wood was glebe land in the ownership of St Peter's Church, and as such could not be developed. However, by 1825, as Burnley began to expand rapidly as a burgeoning cotton manufacturing town, spurred on by the completion of the Leeds and Liverpool Canal in 1801, back-to-back cottages and mills began to develop along the canal at Lane Bridge around Finsley Gate. Between 1825 and 1844 Spring Gardens Mill, together with back-to-back housing were built between Plumbe Street and Eastgate (now Yorkshire Street) and coal mining also began to take place on the north bank of the River Calder between Plumbe Street and Oxford Road.

Several large houses in extensive grounds were built along the western side of Todmorden Road at Springfield close to the Hand Bridge passing over the Calder and the lodge house that served the Towneley estate together with a Roman Catholic chapel, at that time outside the boundary of the township of Burnley. A small hamlet developed around the Woodman Inn at the junction of Todmorden Road and Hufling Lane. Further along Hufling Lane, west of 'Hufflen Hall' a row of cottages known as 'Organ Row' were built near to Towneley railway station which had opened along the route of the Lancashire and Yorkshire Railway between Rose Grove and Todmorden in 1849.

In the second half of the nineteenth century, widespread development occurred in Burnley Wood. The residential elements had two distinct characters: large stone-built houses in spacious grounds, flanking Brooklands Road and Todmorden Road and largely providing accommodation for wealthy mill or mine owners and senior employees, and high-density terraced housing. Burnley Wood also saw the development of an extensive number of cotton mills and associated buildings, largely built between 1860 and 1890. This was brought about by increased pressures within Burnley to expand beyond the canal as the town grew rapidly and allow the development of more factories and mills along the course of the Calder with housing and other facilities to meet the living needs of their workers.

Large scale urban development took place on both sides of the river and by the 1880s, Burnley Wood and the adjoining Fulledge district just north of the river between Plumbe Street and Todmorden Road had developed into a densely populated area of terraced housing laid out in a classic grid iron pattern of horizontal and vertical rows of mainly identikit two bedroomed houses. Most houses built in this period benefitted from rear yards accessed directly off back streets, which were wide enough to accommodate carts (and today can still accommodate modern day refuse vehicles). On the other hand, some houses, particularly on the western and southern edges of the district along Hollingreave Road and Glebe Street, parts of Emily Street, Dall Street, Reed Street, Sussex Street and Huffling Lane, were provided with an additional enclosed space at the front of the houses separate from the pavement. Some even had bay windows and basements. Only these houses, together terraces on Parkinson Street, Stoney Street and the western side of Branch Road now remain, many of which were adapted during the 1960s and 1970s to accommodate bathrooms and modern kitchen extensions. There has also been some limited twentieth century infill housing

The mills that had largely provided employment for Burnley Wood and Fulledge residents were centred close to the banks of the Calder around Parliament Street and Oxford Road and included Spa Field Mill, Fulledge Mill, Hand Bridge Mill, Pentridge (or Partridge Mill which was converted into a cinema during the 1920s to serve both Burnley Wood and Fulledge residents), Burnley Wood Mill, Oxford Mill and Springfield Mill. Plumbe Street Shed, a largely single storey cotton weaving shed was located close to the canal. Most of the day-to-day needs of local residents were met through wide network of corner shops built on most streets, particularly those running on an east-west axis including Springfield Road and Brunswick Street, whilst Parliament Street and Oxford Road developed into specific shopping areas supported until at least the late 1990s early 2000s by their own sub post offices.

Following its completion in the late nineteenth century, the area remained poorly connected to the main centre of Burnley for a number of years owing to inadequate bridge crossings over both the canal and River Calder. Only the historic Hand Bridge which carried the Todmorden Road over the Calder existed at the time together with the Turn swing Bridge over the canal at Finsley Gate. This led to a concerted campaign during this period to see improved links with the rest of the town and led to the replacement of the Turn Bridge, an upgrade of Hand Bridge and the construction of the Plumbe Street and Oxford Road bridges with permanent iron structures. Even then, good vehicular connections, including those of tram services which ran from Burnley town centre along Todmorden Road were restricted by the narrow "Culvert" under the canal embankment at Yorkshire Street until it was significantly reconstructed in 1926.

The emerging community were well served with places of worship and education. Late nineteenth century schools included Burnley Wood School located between Glebe Street and Branch Road; Todmorden Road Council Schools; and St. Stephen's Church of England School in St. Stephen's Street located between Oxford Road and Tarleton Street. St. Stephen's remained as the infant school but was closed in 1969 when it joined the junior school overlooking Towneley Holmes in Woodgrove Road, which had been built in the early 1950s. Burnley Wood School was partially demolished in the mid-1980s when dry rot was discovered and the remaining buildings have been converted into apartments. That school relocated to a new site on cleared properties in the area of Waterloo Road and Springfield Road and in the mid-2000s merged with Todmorden Road School, which itself was demolished, the site of which is now the location of the Burnley Register Office. The main place of worship in Burnley Wood continues to be St. Stephen's Church on Oxford Road and Smalley Street, which is now a Grade II listed building. The religious needs of non conformists were also met in the district, including the Rehoboth Mission on the corner of Waterloo Road and Springfield Road which was demolished in the 1970s, although its Sunday School, built in 1881 on the corner of Springfield Road and Crowther Street still remains and was for a time used as a community centre for the district. There was a Congregational Church on the corner of Kirkgate and Hollingreave Road with its adjacent Sunday School on the corner with Brunswick Street, demolished in the early 1980s and now replaced by a sheltered housing development, whilst the Wesleyan Methodist Chapel in Brooklands Road and south of Stoney Street still remains.

Remarkably, Burnley Wood had managed to retain almost all of its historic public houses despite seeing significant urban clearance of much of the area around Waterloo Road, the north part of Hirst Street and Russell Street in the 1970s followed by a later clearance in the last decade around May Street, Duke Street and the southern part of Hirst Street. These include the Brittania Inn at corner of what remains of Springfield Road and Oxford Road, which was saved from demolition in the 1970s but sadly closed in 2022 and now converted into flats. The Royal Butterfly at the corner of Hollingreave Road and Hufling Lane, The Rifle Volunteer on the corner of Tarleton Street and Smalley Street which remains closed from May 2022 by the owner, and the historic landmark Woodman Hotel at the southernmost end of Oxford Road and Todmorden Road. The Stanley in Oxford Road closed in 2014. Two other public houses did not survive the 1970's clearances; The Owl in the Wood was located on the corner of Springfield Road and Tarleton Street and the Cottage in the Wood was adjacent at the corner of Springfield Road and Rawlinson Street.

There was also a lively political scene in Burnley Wood during the late nineteenth century which led to the founding of both a Conservative Club in 1876 and Liberal Club both on Brunswick Street. The Conservative Working Men's Club (Burnley Wood Club) remains open, although is no longer affiliated to the Conservative Party. After a period of being a Gospel Hall the Liberal Club is now apartments.

== Today ==
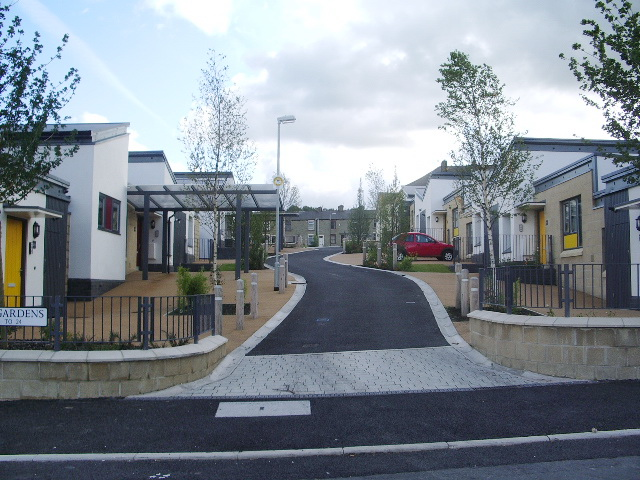
A £4M Sheltered housing development, completed in 2008.

The area saw a significant amount of urban clearance during the 1970s, resulting in the loss of residential streets including Holton Street, Rawlinson Street, Russell Street, Swainbank Street, Laurel Street and many parts of Waterloo Road, Springfield Road and Brunswick Street, which became fragmented as infill housing such as Russell Court and Brittania Walk. The Gerald Court sheltered housing complex, now itself demolished and the replacement Burnley Wood School, now Springfield Primary School were built on the sites of demolished properties at the northern end of Hirst Street and the northern end of Waterloo Road respectively, and most of the mills ultimately closed and were given over to other industrial and commercial uses. However, in around the mid 1990s, Burnley Wood and its proliferation of predominantly lower grade two bedroom terraced houses began to suffered from housing market failure. It became part of East Lancashire's Elevate scheme to clear, rebuild or remodel what were considered to be an over supply of sub-standard housing. The catalyst for this was the 2001 Burnley Riots which brought the problems of Burnley Wood to national attention.

The district lies within the Rosehill with Burnley Wood ward. Demographics show that the ward is 96.86% white British. The index of multiple deprivation places part of Burnley Wood among the 5% most deprived areas in the country, yet parts of neighbouring Rosehill and the area around Woodgrove Road and Brooklands Road within the same ward are in contrast are more affluent than the national average. 21.41% of children in the ward are eligible for free school meals.

The area has a traditionally strong local identity. An active community group, Burnley Wood Community Action Group, publishes a free newspaper, the Burnley Wood Argus, for the area, and Burnley Wood Park, a new community park financed by Elevate, has been built in the centre of the early twenty first century housing clearance area around Morley Street. Previously high crime levels, especially antisocial behaviour by young people, now appear to be in decline: there were 114 crimes per 1,000 inhabitants in the year to December 2007 (Lancashire average 89.4), a fall of 19.2% on the previous twelve months. The area to the west of St. Stephen's church has now been extensively redeveloped with a mix of larger family dwellings and for the first time in its history now allows the church to be viewed in full from Kirkgate rather than behind the previous row of terraces which were recently demolished.
