= Towneley railway station =

Disused railway station in Lancashire, England

Coordinates: 53.7791°N 2.2365°W

Towneley
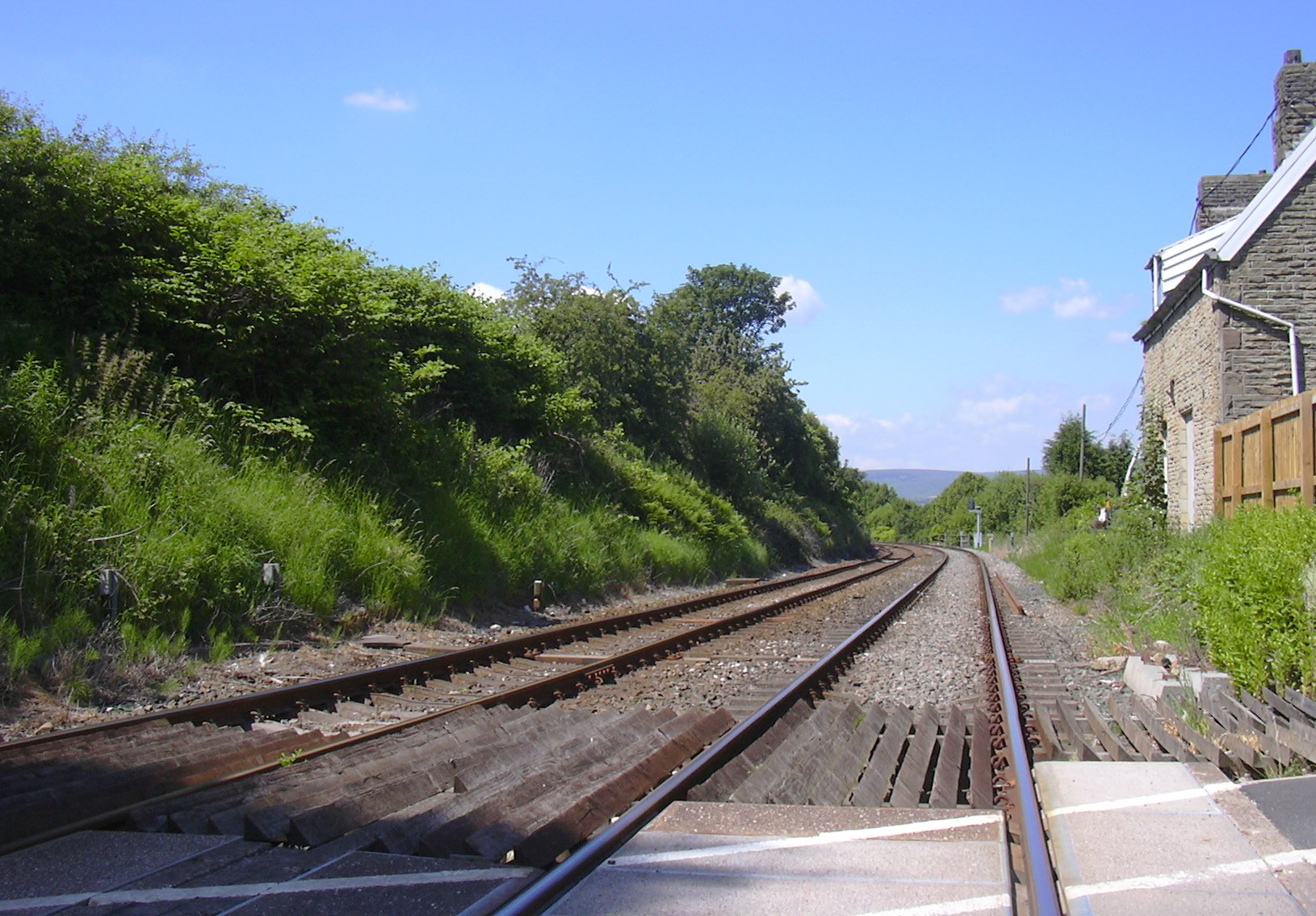
- Railway line through the former station (2010)

General information
- Location: Burnley, Burnley; England
- Grid reference: SD845314
- Platforms: 2

Other information
- Status: Disused

History
- Original company: Manchester and Leeds Railway
- Pre-grouping: Lancashire and Yorkshire Railway
- Post-grouping: London, Midland and Scottish Railway

Key dates
- 12 November 1849: Station opened
- 4 August 1952: Station closed
Location

Towneley railway station was a station in Lancashire which served Burnley Wood and the nearby Towneley Hall on the eastern edge of Burnley. Opened on 12 November 1849 by the Lancashire and Yorkshire Railway, it was served by local trains on the Todmorden to Burnley line until closure by British Railways London Midland Region on 4 August 1952. The station house survives as a private residence, whilst the signal box remains in use to supervise a busy level crossing next to the former station site.

Preceding station	Historical railways	Following station
Burnley Manchester Road; Line and station open	L&YR; Copy Pit Line	Holme; Line open, station closed
