= Thomas Southwell (zoologist) =

British zoologist and parasitologist

Dr Thomas Southwell FRSE FZS (1879–1962) was a 20th century British zoologist and parasitologist.

== Life ==
He was born in Cornholme in Lancashire on 4 October 1879. Although keen to study Medicine, he was unable to do this and instead studied Zoology.

In 1906 he began work in the Pearl Fisheries Department in Ceylon. In 1911 he moved to the Fisheries Department in India. In 1919 he returned to Britain to begin lecturing in Parasitology and Helminthology at Liverpool School of Tropical Medicine.

In 1929 he was elected a Fellow of the Royal Society of Edinburgh. His proposers were James Hartley Ashworth, John Mclean Thompson, Sir John Arthur Thomson, and John Stephenson.

He retired in 1939 and died in Todmorden in Lancashire on 11 June 1962.
