= Scout Rock =

Coordinates: 53°43′30.0″N 1°58′27.2″W

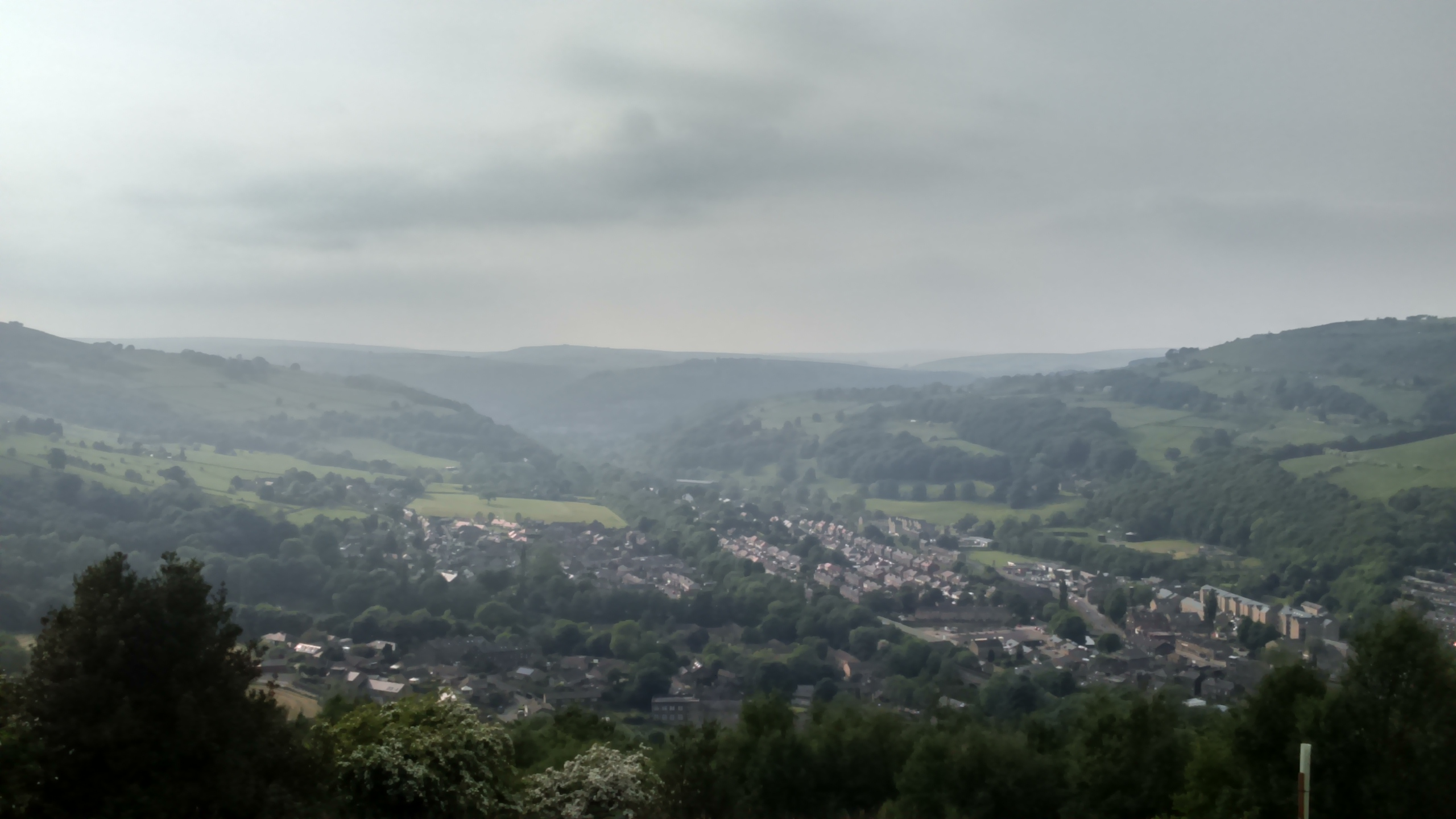
- View looking West from Scout Rock Summit
- Type: Cliff
- Location: Upper Calder Valley
- Height: 130m
- Owner: Hebden Royd Council; Farmers / Landowners

Scout Rock (known locally as Scout Rocks), is a rock face, once a quarry, cut into a hill called Hathershelf Scout and is on the south side of the Upper Calder Valley in the village of Mytholmroyd near Hebden Bridge, England. At its height, the cliff rises 130m above the village and the exposed rock face is visible from as far as Chiserley and Luddendenfoot. The majority of the rock face is now covered in vegetation. Hathershelf Forest is situated at the base of the cliff, and a large beacon stands around half way up the hill on the western side of the cliff face.

== Events ==
Due to the Boxing Day floods of 2015 that affected the Upper Calder Valley, a large landslide occurred at the base of the cliff, and uncovered a large asbestos disposal site, the site is now covered in an encasing whilst work is undertaken to secure the site. The landslide also affected the 'Scout Road' row of houses at its base and the 'Scout Road Academy' school, also at the base of Scout Rock which had to be evacuated and re-located along with around 20 other homes.

== Culture ==
Scout Rock can be seen from the majority of the village of Mytholmroyd, and is usually instantly associated with it. During the hours of darkness, the cliff provides an almost pitch black backdrop to the village. Ted Hughes home was across the valley from the cliff, and was the view from Hughes' window which "provided both the curtain and back-drop to existence" where Hughes' was "fascinated" by it, and symbols or references to Scout Rock in some of Hughes' work. Hughes would call Scout Rock, "my spiritual midwife at the time, and my godfather ever since".

A photograph of Scout Rock appears in Remains of Elmet, Hughes's collaboration with photographer Fay Godwin.

Scout Rock and the surrounding area is the subject of a non-fiction book Under The Rock by writer Ben Myers.
