= Cornholme =

Village in West Yorkshire, England

Coordinates: 53.733°N 2.147°W

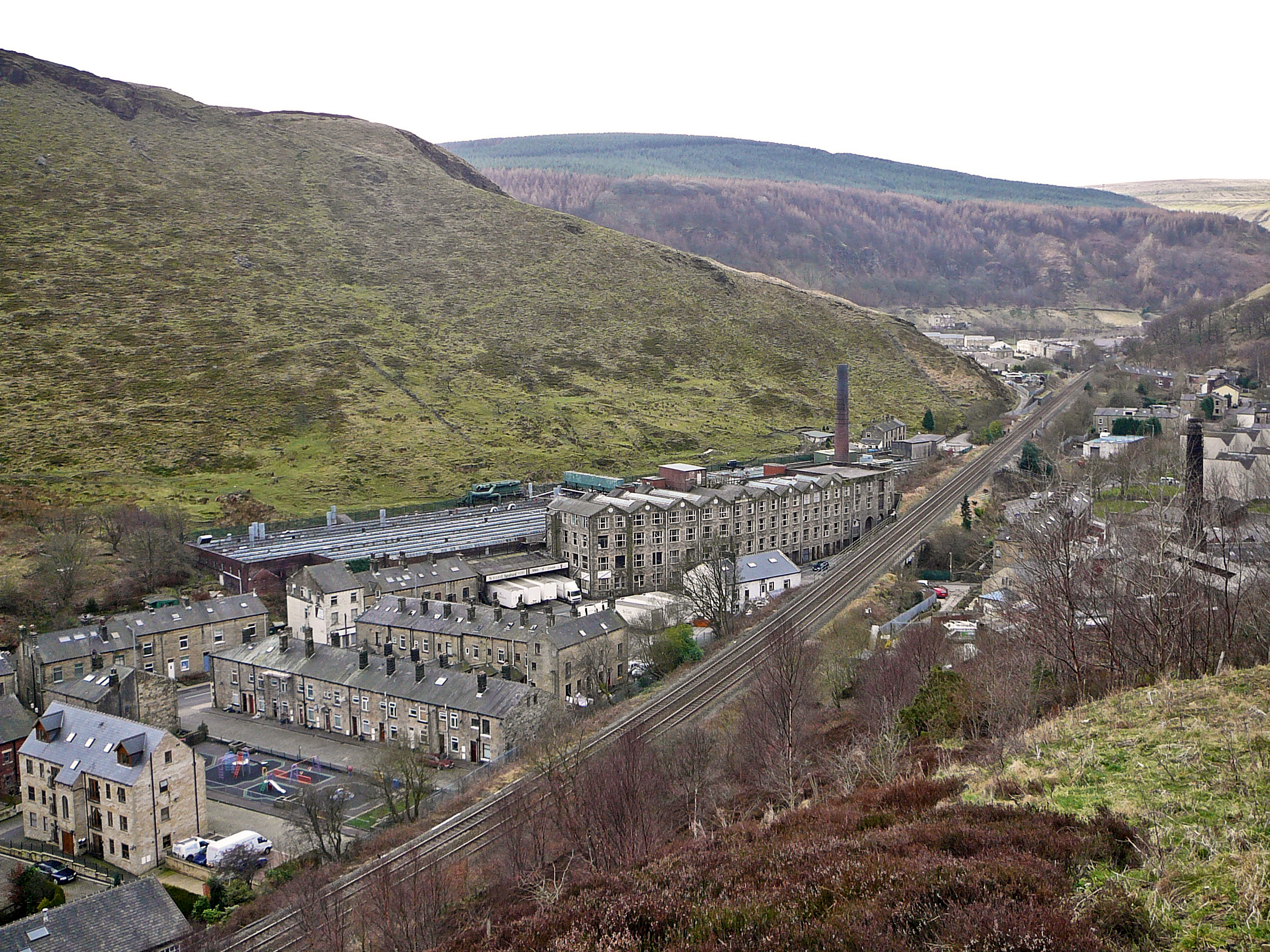
- Cornholme, 2009

- Location within West Yorkshire
- OS grid reference: SD904263
- Civil parish: Todmorden
- Metropolitan borough: Calderdale
- Metropolitan county: West Yorkshire
- Region: Yorkshire and the Humber
- Country: England
- Sovereign state: United Kingdom
- Post town: TODMORDEN
- Postcode district: OL14
- Dialling code: 01706
- Police: West Yorkshire
- Fire: West Yorkshire
- Ambulance: Yorkshire
- UK Parliament: Calder Valley

Cornholme is a village in the civil parish of Todmorden, in the metropolitan borough of Calderdale, in West Yorkshire, England. It lies at the edge of Calderdale, on the boundary with Lancashire, and in the narrow Calder Valley about 2.5 miles (4 km) north-west of Todmorden. The village is close to the A646 Burnley Road.

== History ==
Cornholme was historically a part of Lancashire, and falls within the OL postcode area. The former principal industries of most of the Upper Calder Valley being cotton weaving and the manufacture of textile accessories such as shuttles and bobbins. The village became part of the West Riding of Yorkshire on 1 January 1888 and part of the Borough of Todmorden, within the West Riding, on 2 June 1896.

Cornholme became a civil parish in 1894, on 30 September 1897 the parish was abolished to form Todmorden.

Cornholme was until 1938 served by Cornholme railway station.

Cornholme is the location of a number of scenes in the 2004 film My Summer of Love.

== Famous residents ==
- Thomas Southwell (zoologist) FRSE FZS (1879–1962) parasitologist
