= Mytholmroyd =

Village in Calderdale, West Yorkshire, England

Coordinates: 53.730°N 1.981°W

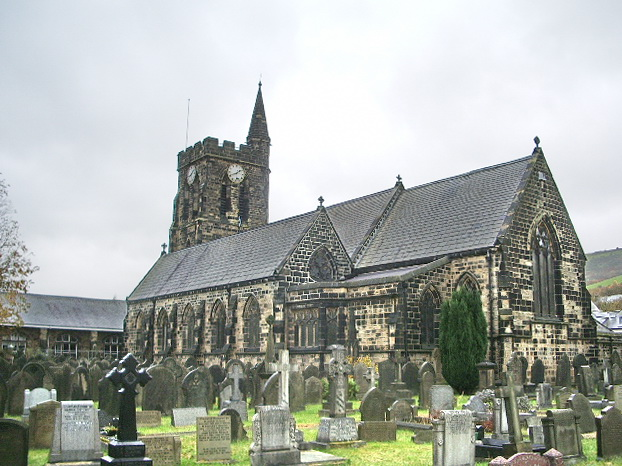
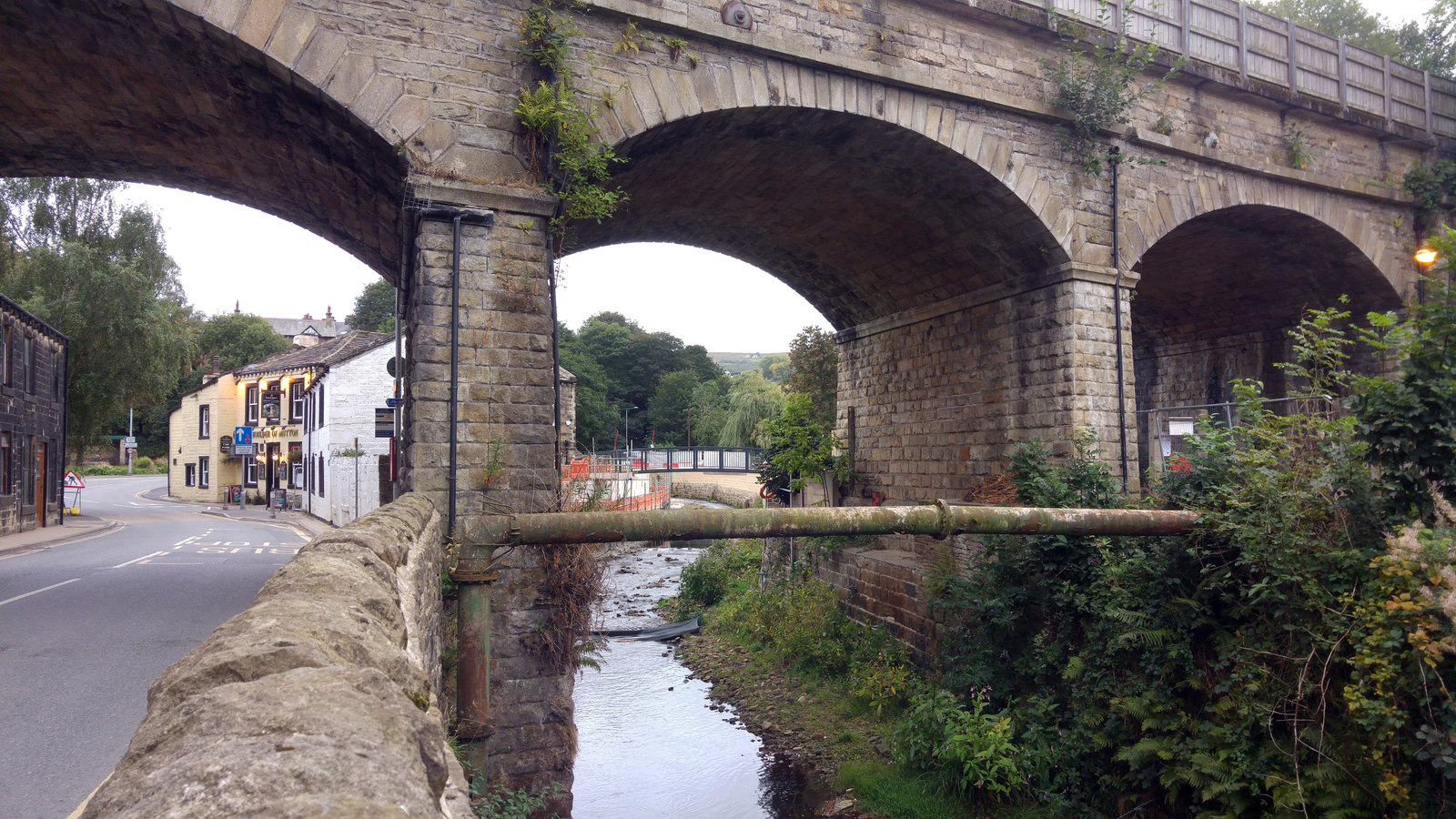
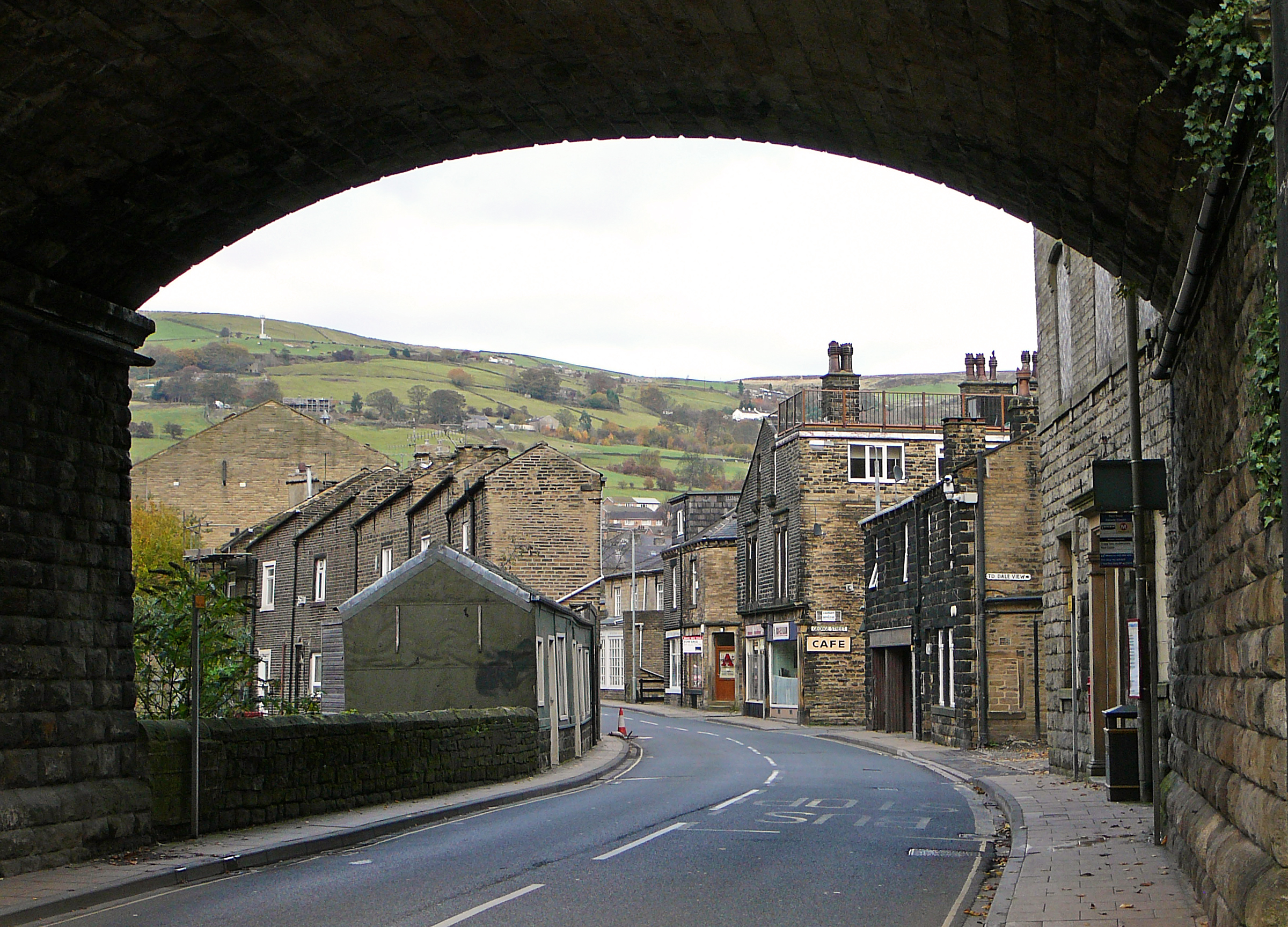
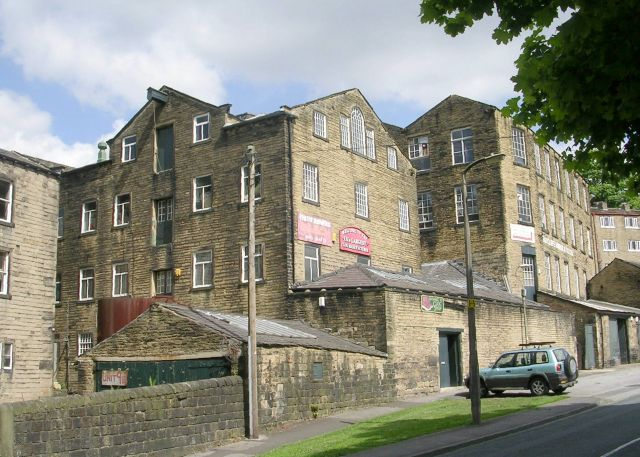
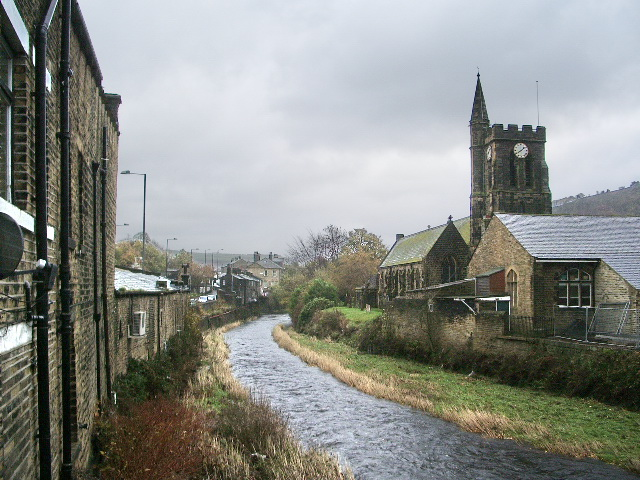
- St Michael’s The Viaduct New Lane in Mytholmroyd Clog Factory River Calder

- Location within West Yorkshire
- Population: 3,949 (2011)
- OS grid reference: SE 012 260
- Civil parish: Hebden Royd
- Metropolitan borough: Calderdale
- Metropolitan county: West Yorkshire
- Region: Yorkshire and the Humber
- Country: England
- Sovereign state: United Kingdom
- Post town: HEBDEN BRIDGE
- Postcode district: HX7
- Dialling code: 01422
- Police: West Yorkshire
- Fire: West Yorkshire
- Ambulance: Yorkshire
- UK Parliament: Calder Valley

Mytholmroyd (/ˈmaɪðəmrɔɪd/ MY-thəm-roid) is a large village in the civil parish of Hebden Royd, in the Calderdale district of West Yorkshire, England, 2 miles (3 km) east of Hebden Bridge. It lies in the Upper Calder Valley, 10 miles (16 km) east of Burnley and 7 miles (11 km) west of Halifax. There are more than 21 listed buildings in the village.

== Toponym ==
Mytholmroyd was recorded in the 13th century as "Mithomrode" and in the 17th century as "Mitholmroide". The name means 'a clearing for settlement, where two rivers meet', likely derived from the Old English (ġe)mȳthum (inflected form of (ġe)mȳthe, "river mouth"), plus rodu ("field" or "clearing"). The L was probably inserted out of confusion with the common place-name element holm, Old Norse for a small island or eyot.

== Governance ==
Mytholmroyd was formerly a chapelry in the parish of Halifax. On 31 December 1894 Mytholmroyd became a civil parish in its own right being formed from Wadsworth, Sowerby, Erringden and Midgeley, on 1 April 1937 the parish was abolished to form Hebden Royd. In 1931 the parish had a population of 4468.

The village is part of the Luddendenfoot ward of the Metropolitan borough of Calderdale. It has had a Labour-majority council as of May 2019 - All 3 councillors in the ward represent the Labour Party - Jane Scullion, leader of the Council, Scott Patient and Katie Kimber who has just retained the seat from the departing Roisin Cavanagh. It is part of the Metropolitan county of West Yorkshire.

At a district level, Mytholmroyd Urban District Council was set up in 1894. In 1937 it merged with Hebden Bridge Urban District Council to become Hebden Royd Urban District Council. At a county level Mytholmroyd was administered by the West Riding County Council. Both of these were abolished as part of the reforms introduced in the Local Government Act 1972. They were replaced with West Yorkshire Combined Authority and Calderdale Metropolitan Borough Council. The Hebden Royd Town Council area forms a civil parish. West Yorkshire County Council was abolished in 1986, leaving Mytholmroyd represented at borough and town council level. The current mayor of Hebden Royd – Val Stevens (Labour, former deputy leader of Manchester City Council) – lives in the village.

== History ==
A Bronze Age urnfield exists on the moor top, north of Mytholmroyd. It is a burial ground with cremation urns, dating between the 16th and 11th centuries BC of national importance. Evidence of pre-historic farming is apparent because they cleared the upland forests for cattle grazing and created the peat moorlands. Most of the Celtic Iron Age settlements were concentrated on the hillside terraces which avoided the wooded and poorly drained valley floors. Most of the older listed buildings are located on the hillsides away from the valley. A Roman coin hoard has been found to the south of Mytholmroyd. Erringden and Midgeley Moors border the village.

=== Cragg Vale Coiners ===
During the late 18th century, the valley to the south, known as Cragg Vale, was home to a gang of counterfeiters known as the Cragg Vale Coiners. The gang's leader, David Hartley, or King David as he was known, was found guilty of the 1769 murder of excise official William Dighton and was hanged at the York Tyburn on 28 April 1770. Two other gang members were also executed for their part in the murder. Recently local resident and writer Benjamin Myers wrote a novel charting their story, "The Gallows Pole" which went on to win the Walter Scott prize for historical fiction in 2018. This publication has now been adapted into a BBC television series.

=== Historic buildings and structures ===
==== Canalside Mill ====
Built in 1851 as Canal Wharf Mill, it was home to local company Walkley Clogs, and converted into a well known tourist attraction with cafes, shops and an open clog factory on the ground floor. It was destroyed by fire in the 1990s; consequently the top floor was demolished and re-opened under ownership of a property development company. It subsequently closed in 2002 and has since been boarded up. Numerous planning applications to continue its former use or convert it into luxury apartments have been passed but never undertaken. On 1 August 2019 it was once again destroyed by fire, this time so badly that it has now been demolished. A planning application for the site development has yet to be accepted.

==== St. Michael's Church ====
The parish church was built in 1847 in Early English style. It was badly damaged in the 2015 floods but has since re-opened. The Sunday school in front of the church was reduced to one storey and is now used as a community hall and meeting spaces available for hire. In 2009 a new car park with monument in the form of an iron spike with a stone seating surround has been constructed park and is now used for village events including the Mytholmroyd Christmas Market organised by Royd Regen (the local development board) and the town council.

==== County Bridge ====
There has been a river crossing point since 1329 in the centre of the village, at the site of the current 'County Bridge'. A bridge is recorded in this location under the name "Elphaborough Bridge", after the name of Elphaborough Hall on the further side of Cragg Brook. Records of a grant issued to the local township for the purchase of timber stated it was for "repairs to Mitholmroide Bridge", in 1638. Similar records show that the current stone bridge was erected in 1684 by Timothy Wadsworth, at a cost of £50. The current bridge was constructed in two parts (and now consists of four extensions). The original packhorse style bridge in 1638, and on the upstream side, the bridge was widened and two extra arches on the south end were added to ease the gradient, although the two new arches were considerably smaller, the bridge now consists of four arches in total. In the 19th century, with shops being constructed on the north end riverbank, and a new premises being built for the Mytholmroyd Co-Operative Society right up to the water's edge on the south bank, two of the bridge's arches are mostly hidden. However, the premises were built with a large opening underneath the buildings, allowing floodwater to still pass through the two hidden arches underground. Mytholmroyd Bridge was eventually taken over by West Riding County Council, which gives the historic bridge its present name of "County Bridge".

==== Railway station and viaduct ====
A prominent viaduct lies above the southern end of Mytholmroyd town centre. It was erected in 1840 by George Stephenson and is still in use as part of the modern day Calder Valley Line. In the 1850s, Mytholmroyd railway station was built, consisting of two platforms built on the Mytholmroyd Viaduct, and a three-storey ticket office, waiting hall and entrance stairwell, leading unto the viaduct. This later closed and the platforms were built a matter of yards up the track on land, and is now accessed by open staircases and long access ramps up the steep banking, where flowers and displays are maintained by the Mytholmroyd Station Partnership. The 19th century listed, 3 floor station building has recently been fully restored back to its former glory both inside and out and is awaiting tenants. In December 2019, the project was awarded the Railway Heritage Trust Conservation Award at the 2019 National Railway Heritage Awards. It was recognised for showcasing a real passion for restoration work and an ability to understand the objectives of the original railway builders and architects. A new, near 200 space station car park is underway at the old loading yard comprising 10 E-car parking spaces, secure cycle lockers and car share facilities. The West Yorkshire Combined Authority are working with the Mytholmroyd Station Partnership to landscape the car park with bee-friendly planters and information boards.

==== Dusty Miller Inn ====
This late 18th century pub replaced an earlier inn on the opposite side of the road, where Bridge End cottages now stand. The earlier building was home to the Cragg Vale Coiners in 1769. The current Grade II-listed inn comprises a hotel, bar and restaurant. The premises were severely damaged in the 2012 and 2015 flooding, causing the business to close for repairs. The bar re-opened in April 2016 and was awarded the "pub of the season award" for summer 2016 by the local CAMRA branch. As of February 2017 the hotel and restaurant are yet to re-open.

=== Gallery ===
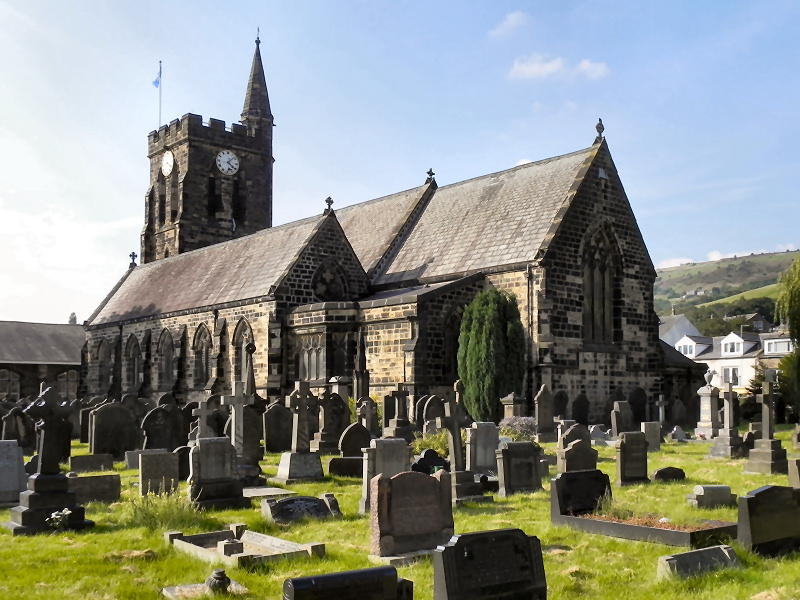
St. Michael's Church, Mytholmroyd

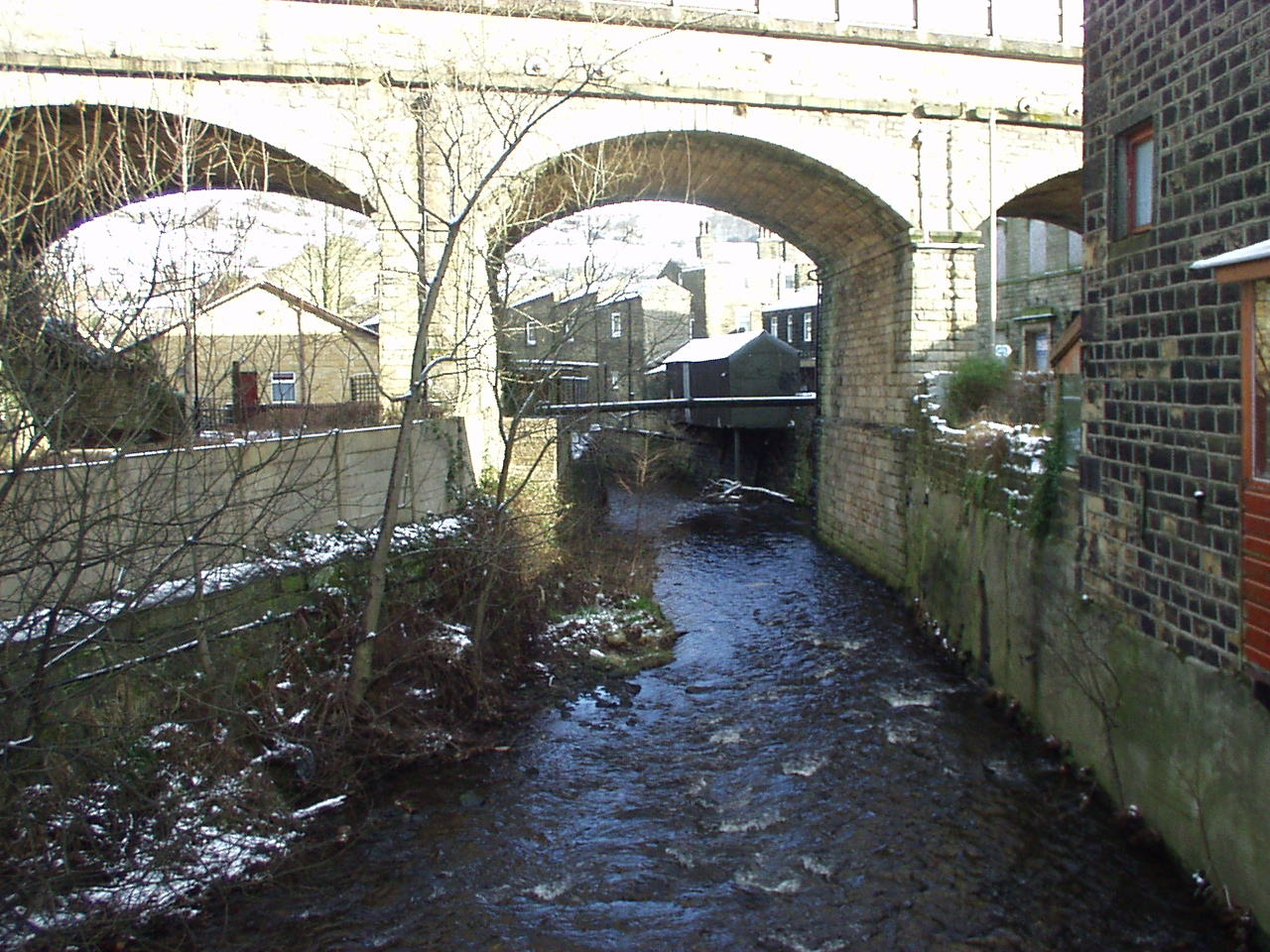
Elphin Brook passing under the Caldervale Line railway viaduct

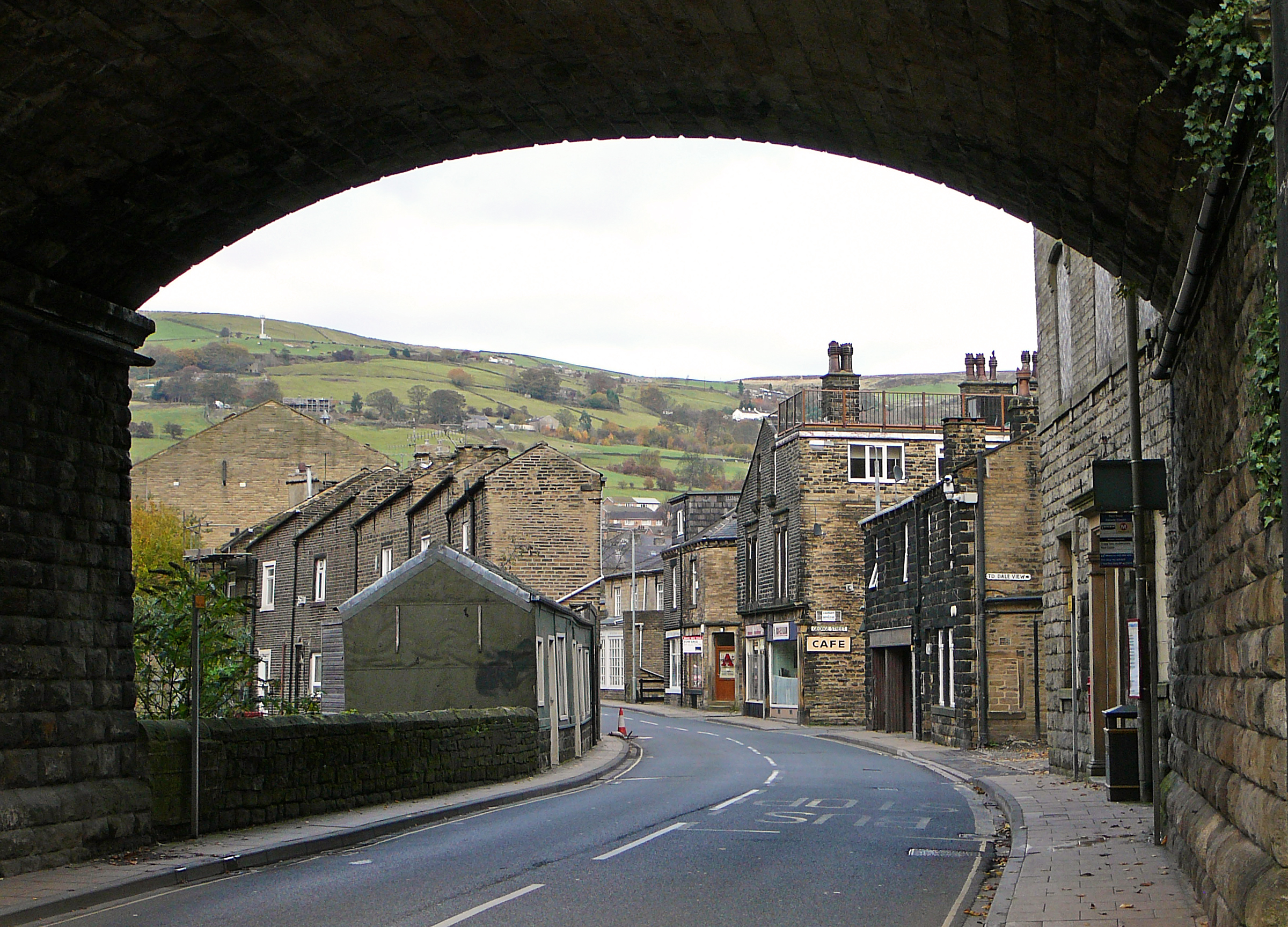
New Road passing under the Caldervale Line railway viaduct

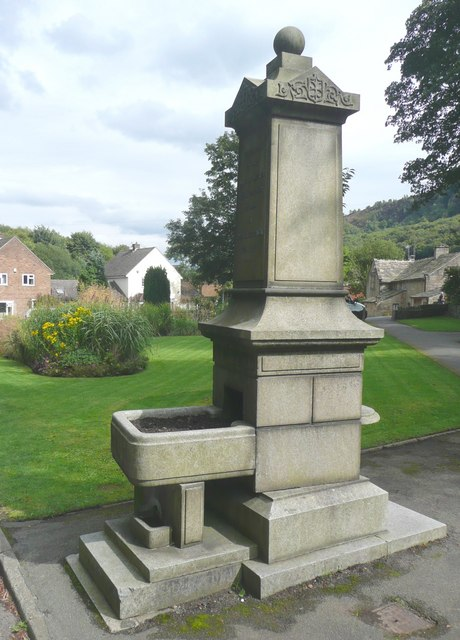
Drinking fountain, off Cragg Road

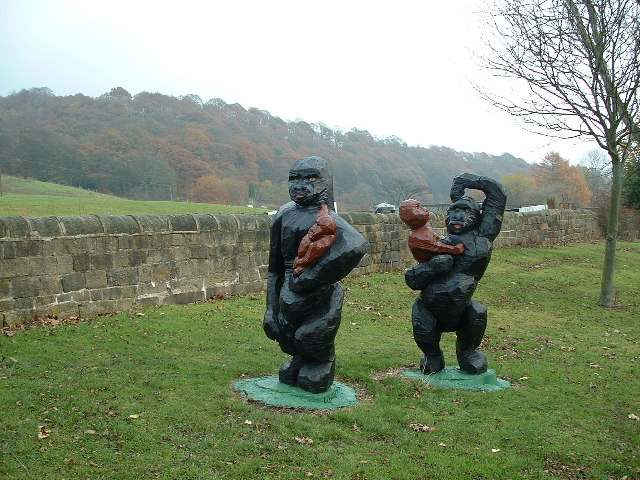
Gorillas next to the Rochdale Canal

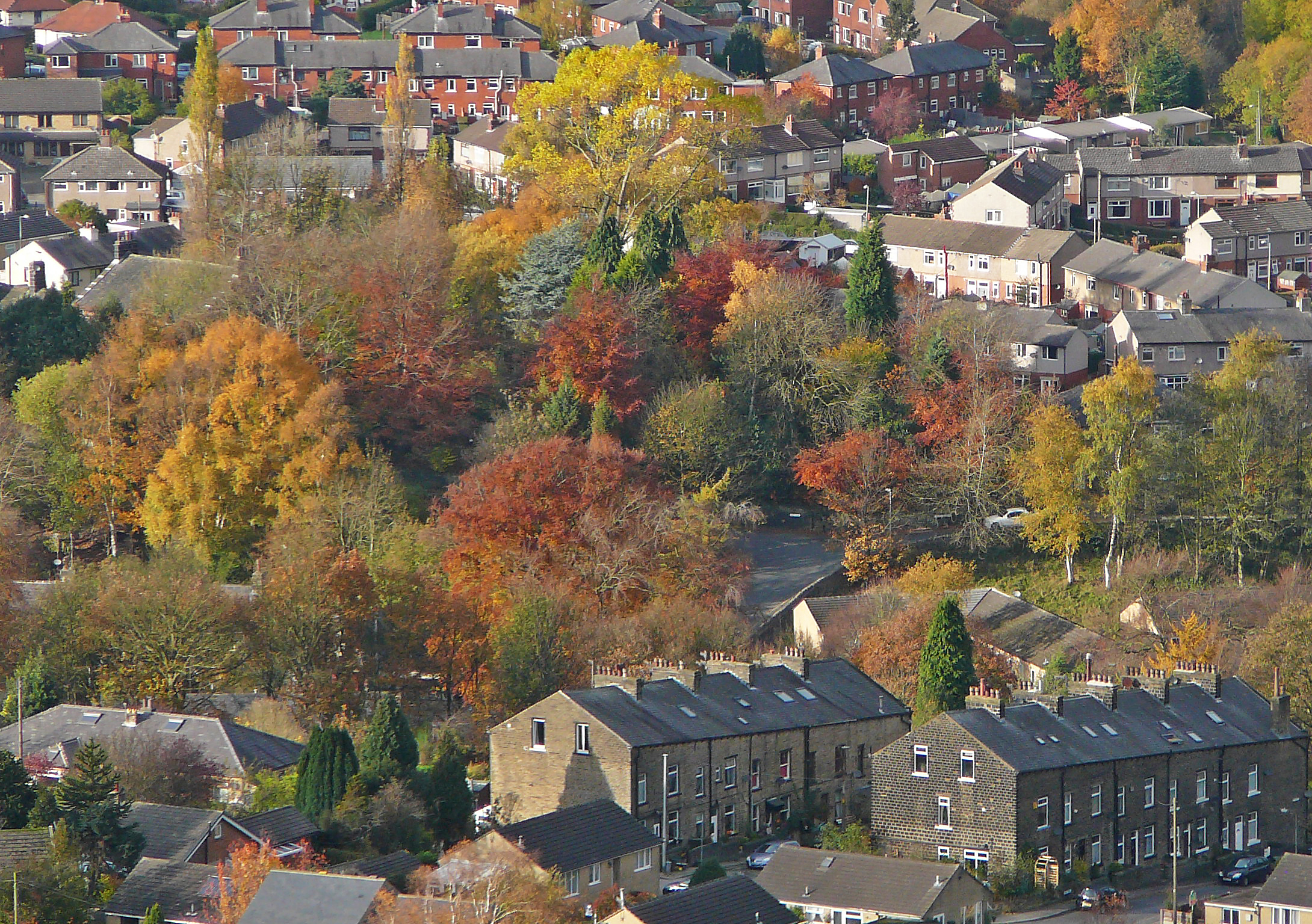
Last colours of autumn, Mytholmroyd (7 November 2010)

== Flooding ==
The village is currently (2017/18) under development with the Environment Agency's 35 Million pound Mytholmroyd Flood Alleviation Scheme. This includes raising the height of flood walls on the banks of the River Calder and Cragg Brook, as well as demolishing homes and businesses on the Calder's banks to widen the river. The village's post office has been relocated to flood-proof premises, with other buildings being stabilised and strengthened. Caldene Bridge, upstream from County Bridge, is being demolished and relocated as well as the bridge at Greenhill Industrial Estate.

=== 1837 ===
A disastrous flood occurred in 1837; few details are known about it, although it is known that the river reached the height of the canal, built on the hillside, and ultimately overflowed it.

=== 1946 ===
In the worst flooding to ever affect the village, many properties suffered flood water up to the second storey, and the village remained underwater for almost 12 hours. Two shops on Burnley Road collapsed into the river, shops just doors down from the buildings that collapsed in the 2015 flood. By 8 am, flood waters reached up to 7 feet.

=== 1954 ===
On Saturday, 21 August 1954, almost 8 years since the devastating 1946 flood, a flash flood devastated the village once again; the river rose by more than 6 ft in less than two hours, with flood water entering properties at over 2 ft every 15 minutes. The Dusty Miller Inn had almost 4 ft of water in its bar area. Flood alleviation works in the 1960s uncovered that County Bridge was standing on foundations untouched since the wooden bridge 17th century, so as part of the works the bridge's foundations were quickly filled with concrete.

=== 2012 ===
A flash flood occurred in July 2012, when a downpour lasting just 90 minutes devastated the village. This was a repeat of another flash flood of June, in the same year, where more than 50 mm of rain fell causing the River Calder to burst its banks. More than 5,000 properties were severely damaged in the Upper Calder Valley; many businesses lost insurance and consequently many never recovered.

=== 2015 ===
Mytholmroyd was severely affected by the Boxing Day floods in 2015, when the River Calder and the canal both rose to cover the valley floor, and consequently the town centre of Mytholmroyd. It was the highest ever recorded river level. Hundreds of homes and businesses were devastated, with some buildings still empty in 2017. The row of shops north of County Bridge partially collapsed into the river, and £10 million was earmarked for future protection of the village. The whole row of shops which partially collapsed have been fully demolished, along with homes along the riverbank at Calder Grove. By 2018, Russell Dean Furnishers had their furniture showroom above ground level and the Co-op Food built a replacement store.

=== 2020 ===
On 9 February 2020, Storm Ciara caused a month-and-a-half's worth of rain to fall on Mytholmroyd within 24 hours. This caused widespread flooding. The EA Flood alleviation scheme was not yet complete so householders and businesses were once again affected.

== Education ==
Mytholmroyd is the home of Calder High School, the largest Comprehensive School in the Upper Calder Valley. It is also home to Scout Road Academy and Burnley Road Academy - where a young Ted Hughes attended. In 2016, plans were announced by Calderdale Council to re-locate Cragg Vale School into Calder High School's sixth form. This is now completed and the new "Calder Primary" is in its 3rd year.

== Culture ==
Mytholmroyd Community Centre hosts the annual Dock Pudding Championships, in April. In 2007 Robbie Coltrane entered the competition and was awarded second place.

Award winning authors Benjamin Myers and Adele Stripe both lived Here, writing award winning books like The Gallows Pole, Under the Rock, Black Teeth and a Brilliant Smile.

Married comedians Jon Richardson and Lucy Beaumont, during an interview in the Halifax Courier headlined "Mytholmroyd's Jon Richardson and Lucy Beaumont tell us about their brand new sitcom", talked about their TV show Meet the Richardsons, which includes fellow comedians and their Hebden Bridge neighbours, and spoke about including a Dock Pudding competition.

Jeremy Corbyn, leader of the Labour Party (2015-2020), visited Mytholmroyd Community Centre twice. Once in May 2018 and also in November 2019 as part of local and national elections. On both occasions he spoke to a packed room of invited Labour Party members.

The 130-foot (40 m) Scout Rock on the south side of the valley in Mytholmroyd features heavily in Ted Hughes' autobiography, The Rock. Hughes was born in the village, before moving to Mexborough, but latterly owned a property in Mytholmroyd in his adulthood. Hughes claimed that Scout Rock cast its mood over the village. Local writer Ben Myers also used Scout Rock as a backdrop for his non-fiction book Under the Rock released in 2018 which charts his time here after moving to the Calder Valley from London.

=== Literature ===
Mytholmroyd is the primary setting in the post apocalyptic Rampart Trilogy series by British writer M. R. Carey. In these books, where many names are lost to time, it is called the village of Mythen Rood.

== Transport ==
=== Rail ===
The village is served by Mytholmroyd railway station, located on New Road, Northern operate a two per-hour service between Leeds and Manchester. However, more frequent services from Hebden Bridge are often used by Mytholmroyd residents, with direct services to Blackpool, Manchester, York, Leeds, Burnley, Rochdale and more. The Calder Valley Line railway was completed in 1841 but there was no station at Mytholmroyd which shows how few people lived here in 1840.

=== Road ===
The village has two bus stops in the village centre — equipped with departure screens and shelters. Bus services are shared between TLC Travel (operating the 597, 900 and 901) and First West Yorkshire (operating the 590 and 592), which serve the village. Cycling is very popular in the area since recent investment including the resurfacing of the Rochdale Canal and Route 66 Cycleway and Le Tour de France passing through the village. The Tour de Yorkshire passed through the village in 2018, and Cragg Vale, also in Mytholmroyd, has the longest continuous climb in England.

== Notable people ==
- Paul Barker, journalist and writer
- Lucy Beaumont, writer, actor, comedian
- Eric Harrison, footballer
- Ted Hughes, British Poet Laureate
- Innes Ireland, racing driver and Grand Prix winner
- Jane Lumb, actress and fashion model
- Danny McNamara, singer
- David Baker, academic and musician

== See also ==
- Listed buildings in Hebden Royd
