= River Calder, West Yorkshire =

River in West Yorkshire, England

Calder
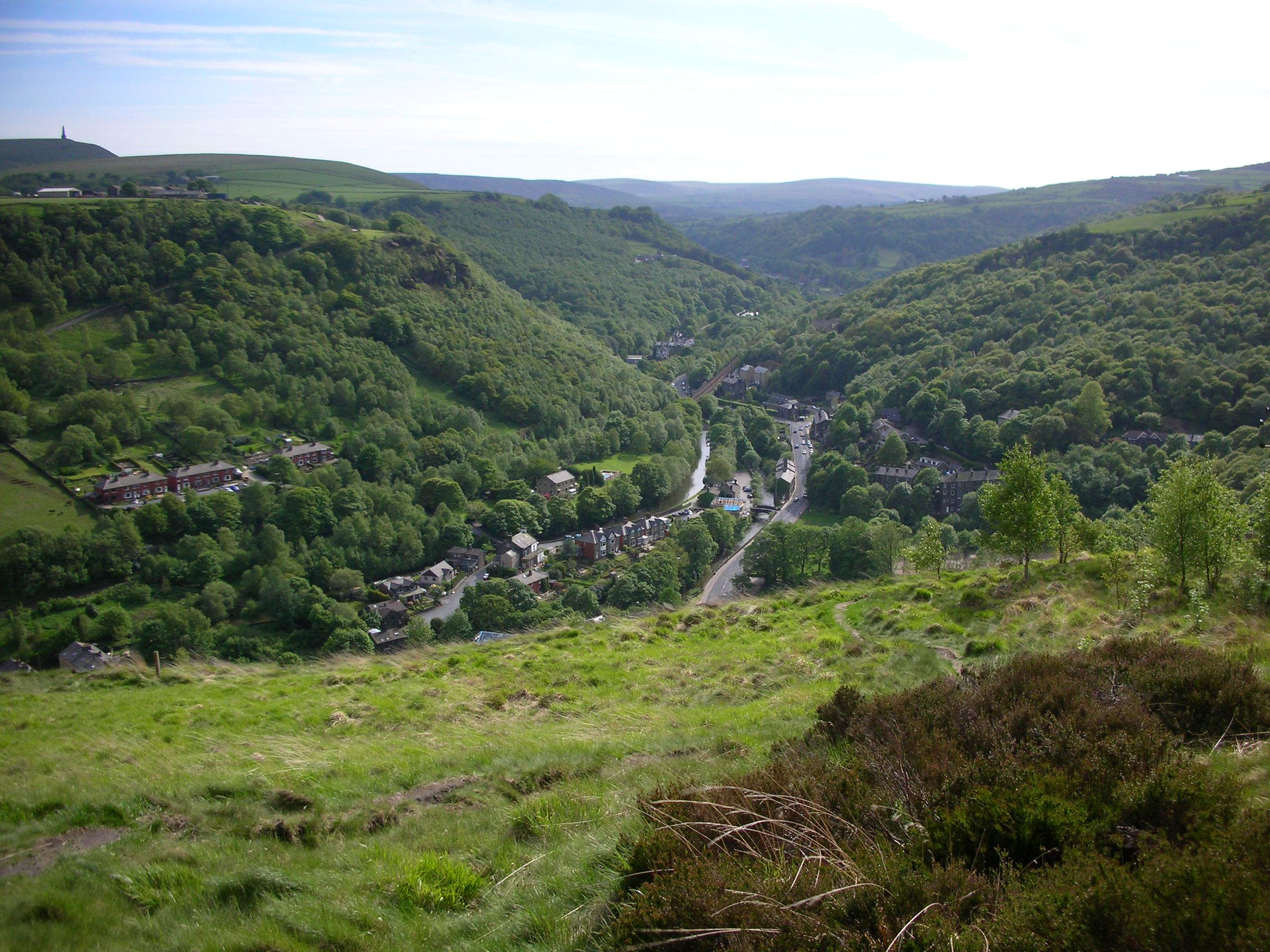
- View of the Calder Valley west of Hebden Bridge

Location
- Country: England
- Metropolitan County: West Yorkshire
- Towns/Cities: Todmorden, Hebden Bridge, Sowerby Bridge, Elland, Brighouse, Mirfield, Dewsbury, Wakefield

Physical characteristics
- Source: Heald Moor
  - location: between Holme Chapel and Cornholme, Lancashire
  - elevation: 1,312 ft (400 m)
- Mouth
  - location: River Aire, Castleford
- Length: 45 mi (72 km)

The River Calder (/ˈkɔːldər, ˈkɒl-/) is a river in West Yorkshire, in Northern England.

The Calder rises on Heald Moor in Lancashire close to the source of another river with the same name, and flows east into West Yorkshire through green countryside, former woollen-mill villages and towns before joining the River Aire near Castleford.

The valley is generally known as the Calder Valley. Calderdale usually refers to the large urban and rural borough (centred on Halifax) through which the upper river flows. The lower reaches flow through the boroughs of Kirklees and Wakefield. The river does not flow through the centres of Halifax or Huddersfield, which are on the Calder's main tributaries, Hebble Brook and the River Colne respectively. The large town centres through which the Calder flows are Brighouse, Mirfield, Dewsbury and the city of Wakefield.

The river is navigable in short sections that are connected by artificial "cuts" (e.g. Horbury Cut) to form the Calder and Hebble Navigation, a leisure waterway which is part of the connected inland waterway network of England and Wales.

== Etymology ==
The word Calder derives from the Brythonic language, with most scholars agreeing that it is a compound of two elements related to the Modern Welsh words caled meaning hard and dwr meaning water. It is a subject of debate as to whether the hard element refers to the river's bed, or figuratively to the strength of its currents. Two separate meanings are commonly derived with 'hard or violent water', or river of stones being commonly given translations.

'Calder' is a common name in Northern Britain found in places across Lancashire and Yorkshire, as well as Calderstones, Liverpool, East Calder and West Calder near Edinburgh and Calderwood near Glasgow, and as the name of the Scottish Clan Calder. The late survival of Celtic speaking peoples in the vicinity of the Calder is perhaps evidenced in the names of villages such as Walsden, in upper Calderdale, which probably derives from *Walhaz Dene, meaning "Valley of the "Welsh" ('Welsh' being what the Anglo-Saxons called the native Celts who would have spoken Old Welsh).

== Geography ==
The river rises approximately 1,300 feet (400 m) above sea level at Heald Moor, north-west of Todmorden, and drains an area of 369 square miles (957 km^{2}). It flows for around 45 miles (72 km) through Cornholme, Todmorden, Eastwood, Hebden Bridge, Mytholmroyd, Luddendenfoot, Sowerby Bridge, Copley, Elland, Brighouse, Mirfield, Dewsbury, Horbury Bridge and on to Wakefield.

The catchment lies on Carboniferous rocks of Millstone Grit, and is heavily reservoired, with 39 reservoirs licensed to provide water. The river is joined by Hebden Water at Hebden Bridge and the River Ryburn at Sowerby Bridge; it is linked to Rochdale, Greater Manchester across the Pennines via the Rochdale Canal.

For much of its length, the Calder is canalised and becomes the Calder and Hebble Navigation. It is also part of the Aire and Calder Navigation, and to the east of Castleford, it merges into the River Aire, going on to join the Humber Estuary and the North Sea.

== History ==
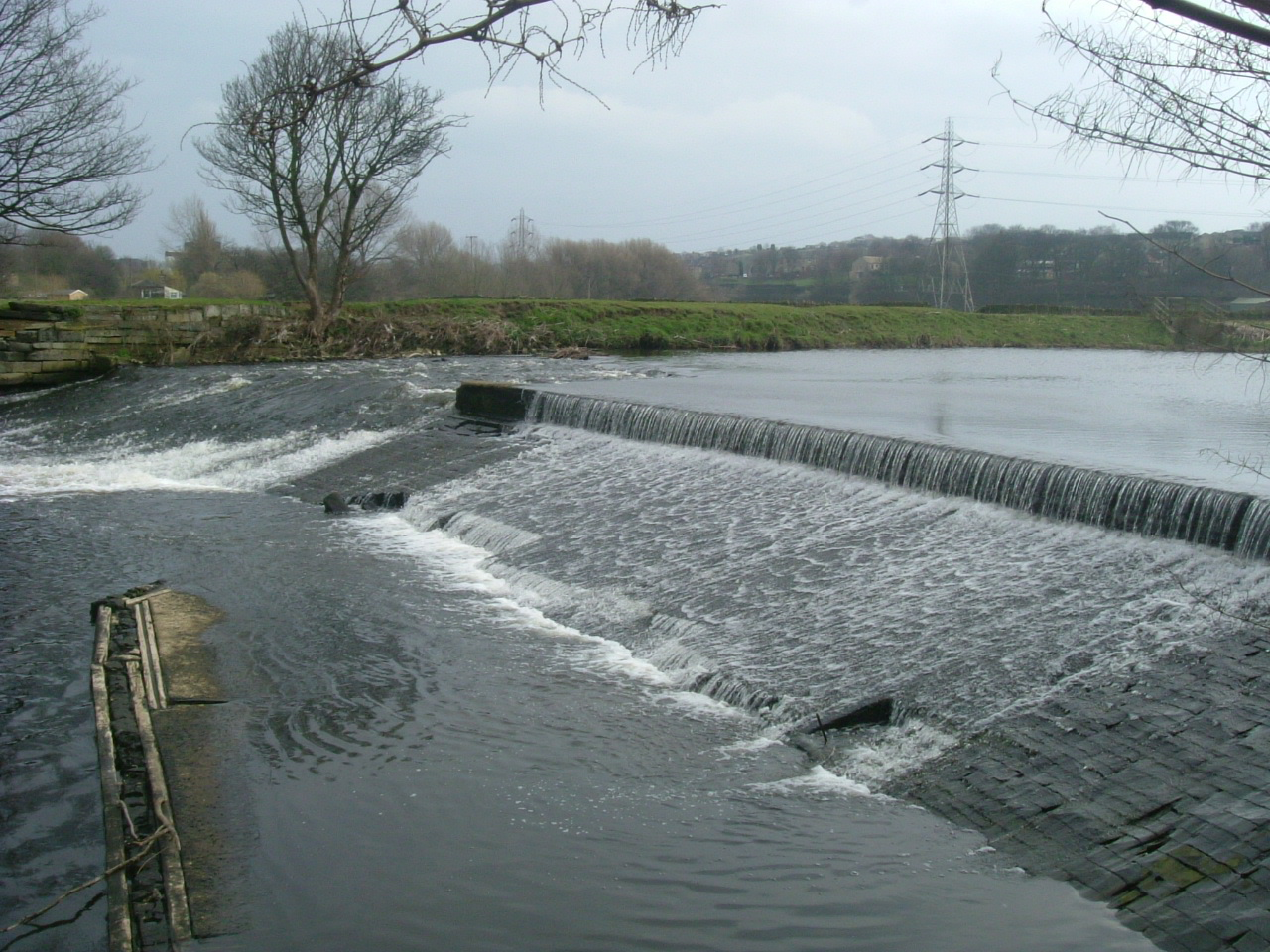
Example of a weir on the river

The river was central to establishing the textile industries in the local area, and flows through the area known as the Yorkshire Heavy Woollen District. Many mills were constructed along its banks, particularly at Dewsbury and Wakefield, but also in # Brighouse, Hebden Bridge, Sowerby Bridge and Todmorden, as well as along its tributaries: the Hebble at Halifax, and the Colne at Huddersfield. The mills in the Upper Calder Valley specialised in cotton weaving, with some cotton spinning, while those in the lower part of the valley specialised in wool and shoddy. Some of these structures still exist as listed buildings, although the large scale production of yarn and textile has eased.

The river was important for transporting raw materials and the products of the mills, particularly before the development of improved roads and railway links to the area. In some places the river is not navigable because of weirs or shallow water and passage for boats was made possible by the creation of cuts where boats are able to enter the Calder and Hebble Navigation. Work began to make the Calder navigable above Wakefield started in 1758.

Wakefield's medieval nine-arched bridge is 320 feet (98 m) long, was built in sandstone between 1342 and 1356, and replaced an earlier wooden structure on the site of an ancient ford. The chantry chapel on the bridge was licensed in 1356. At Wakefield former mill buildings are being redeveloped to create a Waterfront project which will combine residential housing, offices, galleries and public spaces. The Hepworth Wakefield opened in 2011.

In the late 1830s and early 1840s, the River Calder was diverted at Kirkthorpe to aid the building of the railway between Wakefield Kirkgate and Normanton. This straightened out one of the larger curves in the river and was a cheaper option than building bridges to span the river. In 2015 a 100 kW hydro installation and fish pass was completed at Whalley Weir on the River Calder in Whalley. The micro hydroelectric generating plant uses a variable speed Archimedean screw. The weir at Kirkthorpe was adapted in 2017 to be a hydroelectric generating station, with a capacity of 500 kWh.

== Environmental ==
=== Wildlife and fish ===
Until the 19th century, the Calder was home to large numbers of salmon but pollution from the textile and chemical industries along its banks led to the death of the salmon population by the mid 19th century. The last salmon on record was caught at Wakefield in 1850, however there is evidence that they are returning, with sightings on the lower river at Castleford in 2008 and alleged catchings much further upstream. Around Huddersfield, Mirfield and Wakefield are popular areas for coarse fishing, roach, perch, chub, dace, minnows, gudgeon, pike, bream and trout. The areas upstream of Dewsbury are quickly becoming cleaner and more suited to game and specialised river cyprinids like barbel, as well as general coarse fish that are also doing well.

Alongside the river are four Sites of Special Scientific Interest.

Recent improvements in reducing the amount of pollution have led to the return of native wildlife, such as the otter and kingfisher to stretches of the river.

Kingfishers are easily spotted (all year round, due to its orange underbelly) all the way up and down the river's course and are quite numerous around the Mirfield area.

=== Pollution ===
The river has been heavily polluted by the textile industry, and, more recently, chemical works along its banks.

Close to its source at Heald Foot, the water is polluted by the remains of past opencast mining activities and a landfill site. This has also led to a significant amount of soil erosion, with major mudslides into the river and its tributaries in 1947, 1982, 1991 and 2001.

Further down the valley traditional textile industries created a considerable amount of water pollution, particularly through the processes involved in the production of synthetic dyes and in scouring the wool clean. The enormous growth of the population over the last hundred years (currently over 800,000 people live within the river's catchment) has caused other problems in relation to sewage. Another major source of pollution until recently came from a disused tar distillery in Mirfield. In the mid 1950s the river was so polluted by dyeworks in the middle reaches between Todmorden and Sowerby Bridge, that it ran different opaque colours from day to day. On Easter Monday, after a long weekend holiday shutdown, the water cleared and the river bottom could be seen, looking like a grey wool blanket. Tighter controls during the 1950s led to an improvement in water quality, and presently organisations such as Calder Future are working collaboratively with local industries and Yorkshire Water to promote more responsible use of the river and to re-establish lost wildlife along its banks.

== Flooding and flood defences ==
The river has a history of flooding, mainly due to the high sides of its banks in its earlier stages, which cause rapid runoff of water following heavy rain. Much of the lower part of the river has been urbanised, therefore trapping flowing water within the engineered river channels. Fast flows of water cause the deposition of sediment collected from the river banks, raising the river height further.

A variety of flood defences are in operation along the Calder Valley to prevent the recurrence of floods which devastated communities in the early part of this century. At Wakefield, for example, the lake at Pugneys Country Park is used as an overflow for the river in order to protect the town.

The recently regenerated Wakefield Waterfront area is protected by a computer controlled automatic flood barrier system that is housed below ground and rises when a flood threat is detected.

== Leisure use of the river ==
The river is host to a variety of watersports activities:

- a canoeing centre at Sowerby Bridge
- waterskiing in gravel pits at Cromwell Bottom
- watersports and angling at Pugneys Country Park
- the use of leisure craft and narrowboats along the lower stretch of the river where navigation is made easier through the canals built during the Industrial Revolution
- Walking routes along the Pennine Way and Calderdale Way
- Angling in areas is distributed between the following; Bradford No.1 angling association, Mirfield AC, Thornhill AC, and Wakefield AC. Some stretches are free and only require a valid Environment agency rod licence

== Filming location ==
The valley's historic towns and cities have attracted film and television productions. Several films and television series have been filmed in the area, particularly around the town of Hebden Bridge. For example, portions of the BBC television series Happy Valley (2014) were filmed in Hebden Bridge.

The TV series The Gallows Pole takes place in Calder Valley in the 1760s, and is partially filmed in Heptonstall.

== See also ==
- Rivers of the United Kingdom
- List of crossings of the River Calder, West Yorkshire
- List of most-polluted rivers
- Upper Calder Valley
- Murder of Lindsay Rimer, unsolved 1994 case of a 13-year-old girl found murdered in the river

== Sources ==
- Kirklees site about the River Calder
- Rivers Info with images Retrieved 14 December 2007.
