= The Book of Koli =

Novel by Mike Carey

- Author: M. R. Carey
- Cover artist: Lisa Marie Pompilio
- Language: English
- Series: Rampart Trilogy
- Genre: Post-Apocalyptic Fiction
- Publisher: Orbit Books
- Publication date: April 14, 2020
- Publication place: United States
- Pages: 416 (paperback)
- ISBN: 0316477532
- Followed by: The Trials of Koli

The Book of Koli is a 2020 post apocalyptic novel by British writer M. R. Carey. It is the first book in the Rampart Trilogy, preceding The Trials of Koli (2020) and The Fall of Koli (2021). Reviews of the book upon its release were mostly positive. The Book of Koli was nominated for a 2021 Philip K. Dick Award.

== Setting ==
The Book of Koli is set in post-apocalyptic Britain, in the village of Mythen Rood. The main character, Koli, grows up as a wood gatherer collecting wood from the dangerous trees which surround the village. The village is governed by a group of technology wielders, the Ramparts. Much of the life of the villagers of Mythen Rood is dictated by needing to protect themselves from the dangerous flora and fauna that populate the dense surrounding forests.

== Plot ==
The book begins with Koli recounting his dangerous childhood in Mythen Rood. A rite-of-passage of the village is to test the village adolescents to determine if they are able to wield old technological weapons left behind by a past civilization. Those who pass this test are adopted into the village ruling group, the Ramparts.

Koli fails the Rampart's test, but later learns from a wandering healer, Ursala, that the test is rigged in favour of a particular family who is using the guise of technology to maintain hereditary power. Outraged, Koli breaks into the Rampart barracks and steals a piece of technology – which turns out to be a Sony DreamSleeve, a fictional audio player controlled by a Japanese AI named Monono Aware (a play-on-words of mono no aware). At a village wedding, Koli reveals his ability to use the DreamSleeve technology. The Ramparts banish Koli from the village for the theft. As a result of his banishment, Koli is renamed "Koli Faceless", the surname given to shunned people. Koli is left to fend for himself in the dangerous woods surrounding the village. One of the Ramparts secretly follows and confronts Koli, though Koli is able to defend himself – resulting in the death of the Rampart.

Scavengers from a cult which worships a leader named Senlas discover Koli after the commotion of the fight; they kidnap him and bring him back to the cult's encampment. Senlas adopts Koli as an "altar boy", and reveals that Koli will be sacrificed. During his detention, Koli is reunited with Ursala. Eventually, the two escape Senlas' cult with the help of Monono, leading to Senlas' death in a fire.

After their escape, one of Koli's kidnappers follows the group and confronts them. The kidnapper, Cup, is incapacitated. Monono and Ursala advocate killing Cup, but Koli refuses. Monono reveals that there is still signs of life emanating from London. Koli, Ursala, Cup, and Monono decide to travel to London in search of old technology and the potential to reverse the homozygosity which has afflicted the remnants of humanity.
