= Portsmouth (Lancs) railway station =

Disused railway station in Lancashire, England

Portsmouth (Lancs)
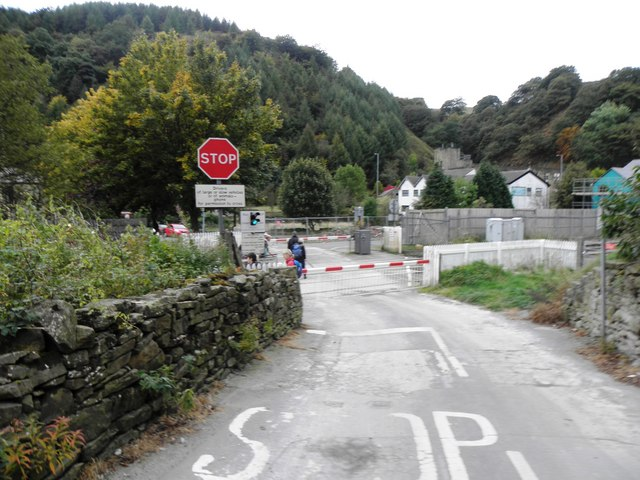
- Level crossing at the site of the former station

General information
- Location: Portsmouth, Calderdale; England
- Coordinates: 53.733190°N 2.153820°W
- Grid reference: SD899262
- Platforms: 2

Other information
- Status: Disused

History
- Original company: Manchester and Leeds Railway
- Pre-grouping: Lancashire and Yorkshire Railway
- Post-grouping: London, Midland and Scottish Railway

Key dates
- 12 November 1849: Opened as Portsmouth
- after January 1948: Renamed Portsmouth (Lancs)
- 7 July 1958: Closed
Location

Portsmouth railway station was on the Copy Pit line and served the village of Portsmouth, which was part of Lancashire, before being incorporated into the West Riding of Yorkshire in the late 1880s. It is now in the successor county of West Yorkshire. It opened along with the line in 1849 but was closed as an economy measure on 7 July 1958. Few traces of the station remain, although the line itself remains in use for passenger trains between Burnley and Hebden Bridge or Todmorden.

Preceding station	Historical railways	Following station
Holme; Line open, station closed	L&YR; Copy Pit Line	Cornholme; Line open, station closed
