= List of people from the City of Wakefield =

This is a list of people from the City of Wakefield, a local government district in West Yorkshire, England. This list includes notable people from Wakefield, and the wider district, and so includes people from Normanton, Pontefract, Featherstone, Castleford and Knottingley and other areas. This list is arranged alphabetically by surname:

== A ==
- Victor Adebowale, Baron Adebowale of Thornes
- Imran Ahmad Khan, former MP for Wakefield; suspended and resigned; convicted child sex offender.

== B ==
- William Baines, pianist
- Ron Barber, politician
- Stan Barstow, writer
- Nigel Boocock, speedway rider
- Matthew Booth, actor, Emmerdale
- Geoffrey Boycott, former Yorkshire and England cricketer
- Tom Briscoe, rugby league footballer who has played for Hull; currently representing Leeds Rhinos and England
- Thomas Byran, Victoria Cross recipient in 1917
- Andrew Burt, actor

== C ==
- John Carr, architect
- Claire Cooper, actress
- Martin Creed, artist

== D ==
- Janet Davies, actress
- Reece Dinsdale, actor, Home to Roost, Ahead of the Class, Coronation Street

== E ==
- Harry Earnshaw (1915–1985), racing cyclist
- Monica Edwards, children's novelist
- Mick Exley, rugby league footballer who played in the 1920s, 1930s and 1940s, for Great Britain, England, Yorkshire, and Wakefield Trinity

== F ==
- Louisa Fennell, painter of local scenes in Wakefield
- Jean Fergusson, actress
- Charles Fernandes (1857–1944), rugby union footballer who played in the 1880s for England, and Leeds
- Helen Fielding, author
- Emily Freeman, athlete
- Martin Frobisher, explorer, found the Northwest Passage
- Neil Fox, rugby league footballer who played in the 1950s, 1960s and 1970s, for England, Yorkshire, Great Britain and Wakefield Trinity

== G ==
- Noel Gay, composer
- George Gissing, novelist and misanthrope
- Chris Greenacre, former footballer, last played for Wellington Phoenix

== H ==
- Bob Haigh, English rugby league footballer who played in the 1960s and 1970s, and coached in the 1970s
- John George Haigh, 1940s serial killer known as the Acid Bath Murderer
- Michelle Hardwick, soap actress best known for playing vet Vanessa Woodfield in Emmerdale since 2012 and hospital receptionist Lizzie Hopkirk in the ITV drama series The Royal.
- Norman Hardy, cricketer
- John Harrison, clockmaker who solved the longitudinal problem, leading to sea power and GMT
- Chanelle Hayes, Big Brother 8 contestant, now a glamour model
- John Healey, politician, Chancellor of the exchequer, former defence secretary and the former Financial Secretary to the Treasury
- Barbara Hepworth, sculptor
- Nichi Hodgson, author, journalist and broadcaster
- Keith Holliday, rugby league footballer of the 1950s and 1960s for Great Britain, Yorkshire, and Wakefield Trinity
- Reenie Hollis, bassist in indie band The Long Blondes
- Duane Holmes, footballer for Huddersfield Town
- David Hope, Baron Hope of Thornes, former Archbishop of York

== I ==
- Benjamin Ingham, 18th-century evangelist

== J ==
- Gary Jarman, member of indie band The Cribs
- Ross Jarman, member of indie band The Cribs
- Ryan Jarman, member of indie band The Cribs

== K ==
- Chloe Khan, tv personality and Playboy model
- Cyril Knowles, former footballer for Tottenham Hotspur and England
- Peter Knowles, former footballer for Wolverhampton Wanderers
- Andy Kelly, rugby league player and coach
- Neil Kelly, rugby league player and coach
- Richard Kelly, rugby league player and coach
- Bobby Krlic, musician, producer and film score writer under the moniker The Haxan Cloak

== L ==
- Sir Albert Lamb, newspaper editor
- Derek Lane (born 1974), cricketer
- John Leech (1971–), Liberal Democratic leader in Manchester, Member of Parliament for Manchester Withington, one of two MPs to rebel against the formation of the 2010 Coalition Government.
- Jimmy Ledgard, 1954 Rugby League World Cup winning rugby league footballer of the 1940s, 1950s and 1960s, for Great Britain, England, and Dewsbury
- Kenneth Leighton, composer
- John Liley, Rugby Union player, most notably for Leicester Tigers
- Alison Littlewood, author
- Eric Lockwood (1932–2014), English rugby league footballer who played in the 1950s and 1960s
- Johnny Longden, champion jockey in the United States, founder of Jockey's Guild
- Frederick Lowrie (1868–1902), rugby union footballer who played in the 1880s and 1890s

== M ==
- Andy Madley, Premier League football referee
- Bobby Madley, Premier League football referee
- Leonard Marson, rugby league footballer of the 1930s, 1940s and 1950s, for England, Yorkshire, and Wakefield Trinity
- Anne O'Hare McCormick, journalist, first woman to win the Pulitzer Prize
- Brian McDermott, rugby league player and coach
- Jane McDonald, singer and television personality
- David Mercer, playwright
- Henry Moore, sculptor
- Andrew Moynihan, recipient of the Victoria Cross in 1855

== N ==
- Bill Nelson, founder, lead guitarist and singer of 1970s progressive rock band Be-Bop Deluxe (founded in Wakefield) and of the New Wave and synthpop group Red Noise; solo music artist
- Ian Nelson, musician and member of synthpop band Fiat Lux; member of 1970s progressive rock band Be-Bop Deluxe; younger brother of Bill
- Paul Newlove, former professional rugby league footballer; current school teacher

== P ==
- Ian Parkin, rhythm guitarist of the original line-up of 1970s progressive rock band Be-Bop Deluxe
- David Peace, author
- Arthur Uther Pendragon (born 1954), activist and self-declared reincarnation of King Arthur
- Dave Penney, former manager of Doncaster Rovers FC, now manager of Darlington FC
- Carolyn Pickles, actress, great-niece of Wilfred Pickles
- Harold Poynton, rugby league footballer of the 1950s, 1960s and 1970s, for Great Britain, Yorkshire, and Wakefield Trinity

== R ==
- John Radcliffe, scientist and founder of the eponymous library in Oxford
- Don Robinson, 1954 Rugby League World Cup winning rugby league footballer of the 1950s and 1960s, for Great Britain, Wakefield Trinity, and Leeds

== S ==
- Ian Sampson, former English footballer, formerly managed Northampton Town FC
- Ian Sampson, rugby league player, Bramley, Hunslet RFLFC
- Annabel Scholey, actress
- Jayne Sharp, TV presenter
- Richard Stoker, composer
- David Storey, novelist and playwright
- Jill Summers, actress
- Paul Sykes, heavyweight boxer

== T ==
- Alan M. Taylor, economist
- Jane Tomlinson, athlete and cancer charity fundraiser (from Rothwell in Leeds, on Wakefield border)
- Anne Treisman, specialist in cognitive psychology
- Derek Turner, 1960 Rugby League World Cup winning rugby league footballer of the 1940s, 1950s and 1960s, for Great Britain, England, Hull Kingston Rovers, Oldham, and Wakefield Trinity

== U ==
- Robert Ullathorne, former Premiership footballer with Norwich City, Leicester City

== W ==
- Charles Waterton, naturalist
- Jason Wilsher-Mills, Artist
- Helen Worth, longtime Coronation Street cast-member
- John Wolfenden, Baron Wolfenden, author of the report on the law concerning homosexuality and prostitution. Although born in Wiltshire, Wolfenden grew up in Wakefield and attended Queen Elizabeth Grammar School, Wakefield.

== Z ==
- Steve Zodiac, guitarist, singer and songwriter of hard rock band Vardis

== See also ==
- List of people from West Yorkshire
