= Sarah E. Hooper =

American activist and educator

Sarah Emery Hooper (1822–1914) was an American activist and educator known for founding the Boston Cooking School.

== Personal life ==
She was born in 1822 in Buxton, Maine to Samuel Jose and Sarah (Emery) Jose. In 1845 she married Samuel T. Hooper and soon thereafter moved with him to Melbourne, Australia. They returned to the US shortly before the onset of the American Civil War.

== Career ==
During the American Civil War, she worked closely with the United States Sanitary Commission (USSC), a private relief agency created by federal legislation in 1861 to support sick and wounded soldiers.

Hooper took an active role in many organizations, including Boston's Women’s Education Association, (Note: Not to be confused with the Women's Educational and Industrial Union) which focused on the education of women. In the 1870s, as the Women’s Centennial Committee of Massachusetts worked to organize a women's pavilion for the 1876 Centennial Exposition to be held in Philadelphia, Hooper was vice-president of its executive committee.

=== Boston Cooking School ===
According to Mary Johnson Bailey Lincoln, the first principal of the Boston Cooking School:

The determining influence in the organization of the Boston Cooking School was the return of Mrs. Sarah E. Hooper from a long sojourn in Australia. She had seen the work at the South Kensington School (Note: The National School of Cookery, Exhibition Road, South Kensington, London had been founded in 1873 as The Popular School of Cookery.) on her way through London and came home filled with enthusiasm to have similar work in Boston, especially for the benefit of the poor and those who would work out as cooks.

Hooper persuaded Boston's Women’s Education Association, of which she was an active member, to authorize $100 to launch a cooking school in Boston. As a result, the Boston Cooking School opened on March 10, 1879, at 158½ Tremont Street. The school became famous following the 1896 publication of The Boston Cooking-School Cook Book by its principal at the time, Fannie Merritt Farmer.

After the school was incorporated in 1883, Hooper became the first president of the Boston Cooking School Corporation, which managed its business and finances.
