= Bavarian cream =

Custard dessert

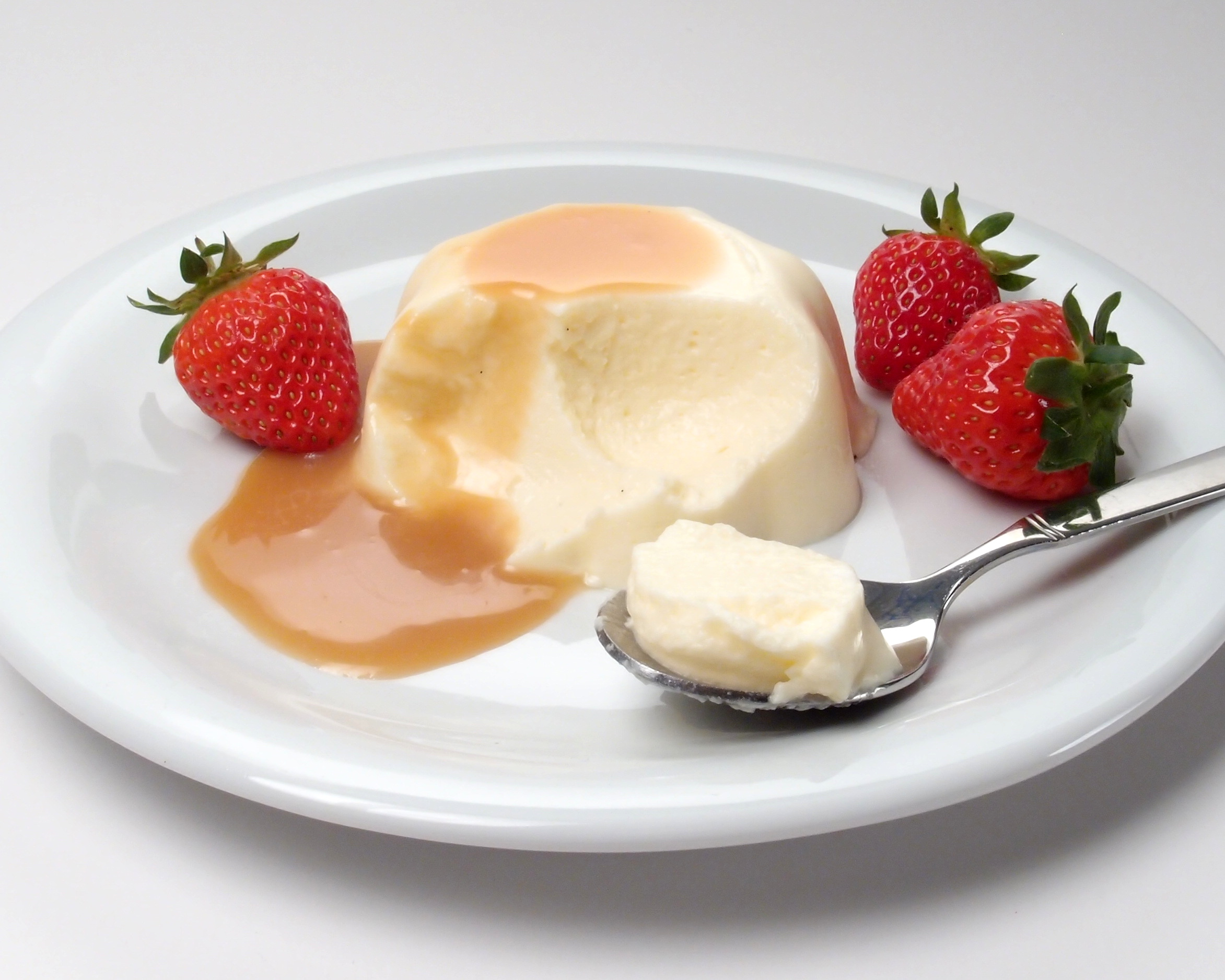
- Bavarian cream with strawberries and caramel sauce
- Alternative names: Crème bavaroise, Bavarois
- Type: Custard
- Course: Dessert
- Place of origin: France
- Main ingredients: Milk, eggs, gelatin, whipped cream

Bavarian cream, crème bavaroise or simply bavarois is a French dessert consisting of an egg-based cooked custard (milk thickened with eggs) and gelatin or isinglass, into which whipped cream is folded. The mixture sets up in a cold mold and is unmolded for serving. Earlier versions, sometimes called fromage bavarois, did not include eggs or any actual cheese. One recipe using isinglass also calls for crumbled amaretto cookies, chocolate and other flavorings. One contemporary French recipe for "bavarois" is a savory preparation with a neufchâtel-type cheese and leeks, and is not a sweet dessert.

== History ==
Bavarian cream is a classic dessert that was included in the repertoire of chef Marie-Antoine Carême, who is sometimes credited with it. It was named in the early 19th century for Bavaria or, perhaps in the history of haute cuisine, for a particularly distinguished visiting Bavarian, such as a Wittelsbach, given that its origin is believed to have been during the 17th and 18th century when French chefs cooked for the Wittelsbach princes, a German family that ruled Bavaria from the 12th century until 1918.

In the United States, Bavarian creams first appeared in Boston Cooking School books by D. A. Lincoln in 1884, and by Fannie Farmer in 1896. From 1884 to 2022, there were over 95,000 references to Bavarian cream in US and Canadian newspapers, featuring recipes, commentaries and reviews.

== Preparation and serving ==
Bavarian cream is lightened with whipped cream when on the edge of setting up and before it is molded; a true bavarian cream is usually filled into a fluted mold, chilled until firm, then turned out onto a serving plate. By coating a chilled mold first with a fruit gelatin, a glazed effect can be produced. Imperfections in the unmolding are disguised with strategically placed fluted piping of whipped cream. In the United States, it is common to serve Bavarian Cream directly from the bowl it has been chilled in, similar to a French mousse. In this informal presentation, Escoffier recommended the bavarian cream be made in a "timbale or deep silver dish which is then surrounded with crushed ice".

It may be served with a fruit sauce or a raspberry or apricot purée or used to fill elaborate charlottes.

Though it does not pipe smoothly because of its gelatin, it could substitute for pastry cream as a filling for doughnuts. Some American "Bavarian Cream doughnuts" are filled with a version of a crème pâtissière (pastry cream) while some are filled with true bavarois. The "Bavarian Cream" part of the name refers to the type of doughnut filling, with doughnuts including chocolate-frosted and non-chocolate-frosted varieties. Spellings of "cream" may differ, such as the Bavarian Crème Bismark from Seattle-based Top Pot Doughnuts.

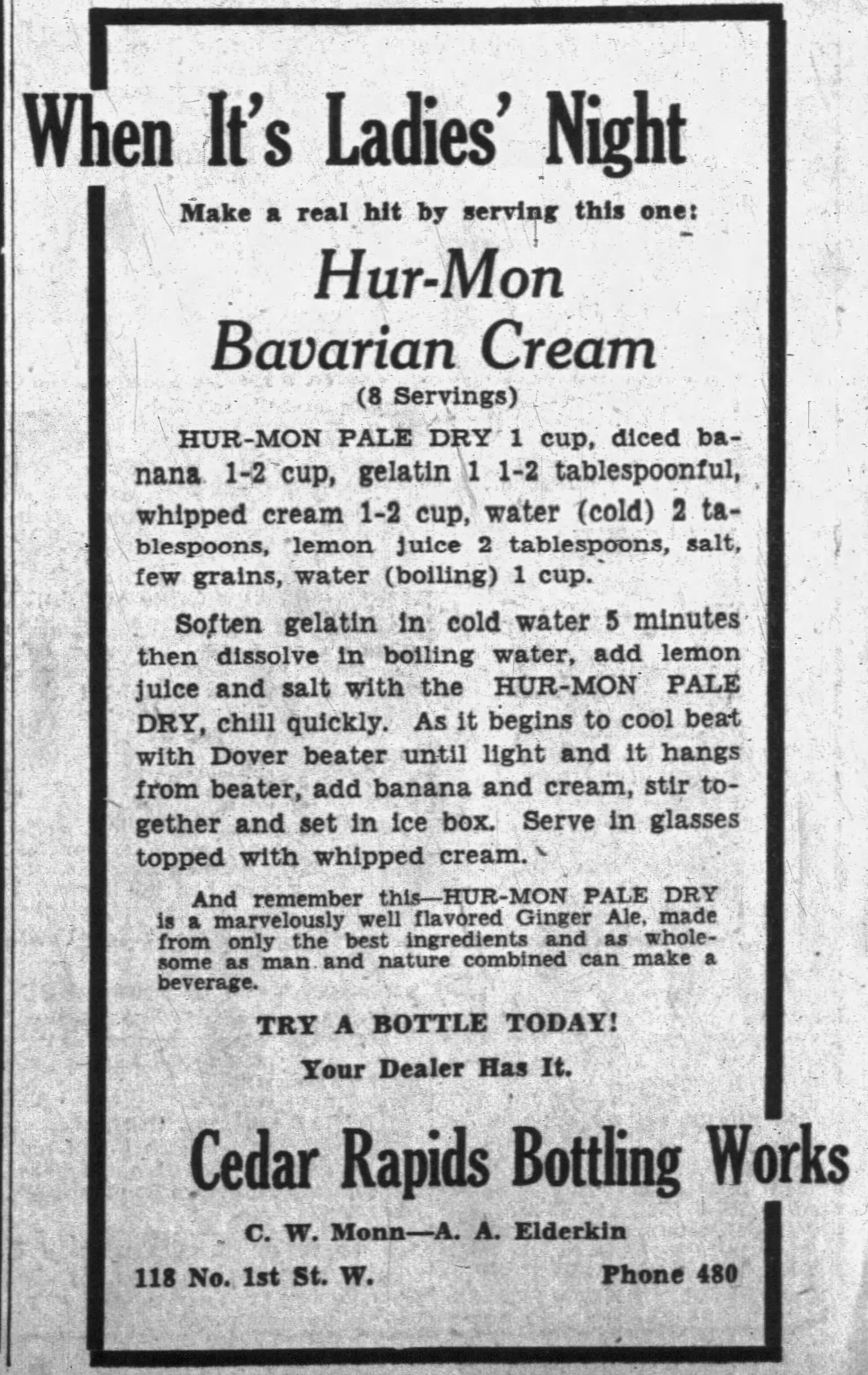
A Bavarian Cream recipe from 1929, which did not require cooking or eggs.

Such was the popularity of Bavarian Cream in the 1920s that a soda/pop company in Iowa, Hur-Mon of Cedar Rapids, published a Bavarian Cream recipe calling only for whipped cream, whipped gelatin and ginger ale. This cold preparation eliminated the need for cooking the more typical egg-based custard commonly found in recipes requiring more complex skills.

== Gallery ==
Some Bavarian cream preparations include the following.

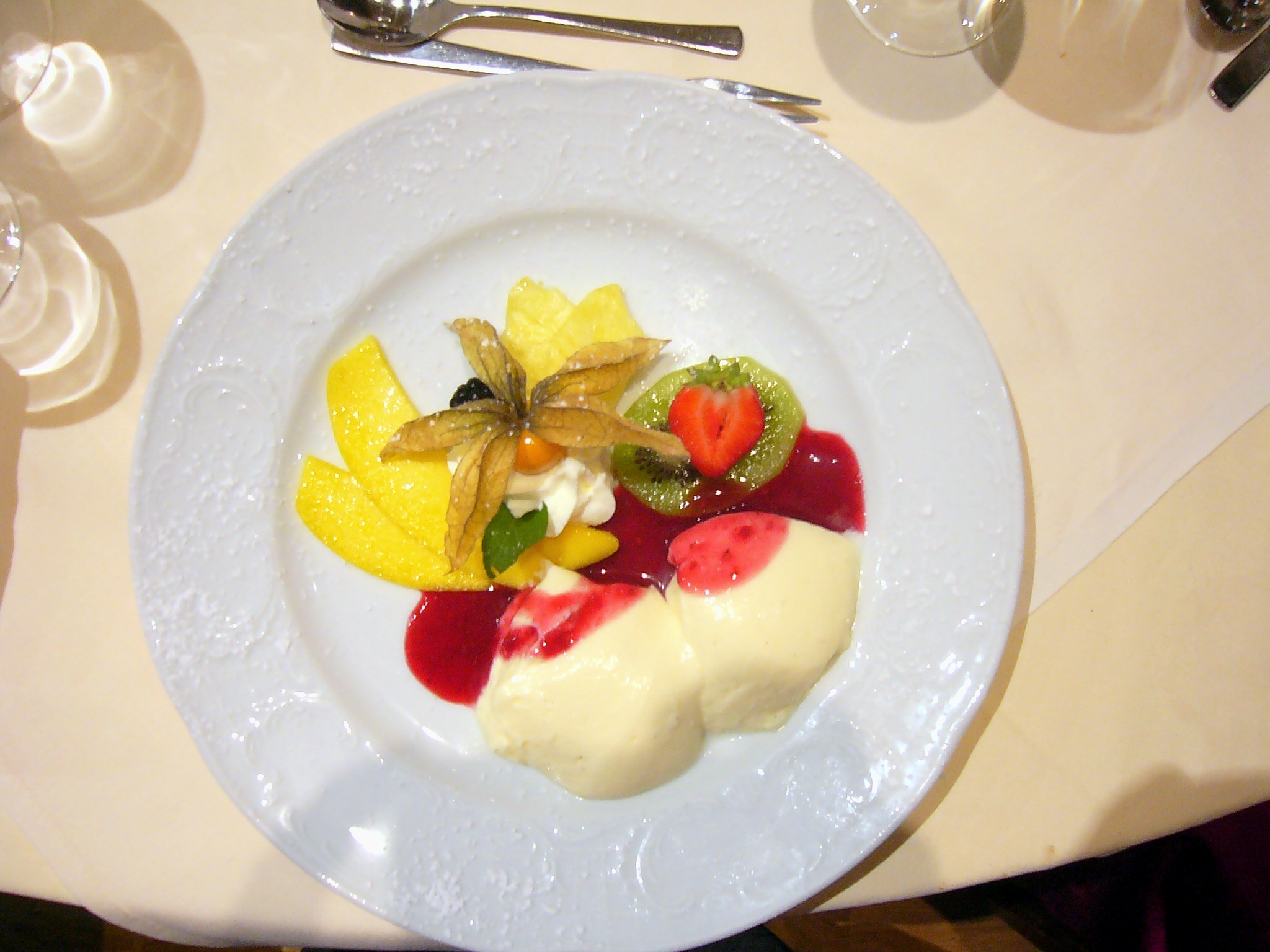
Bavarian cream with assorted fruit

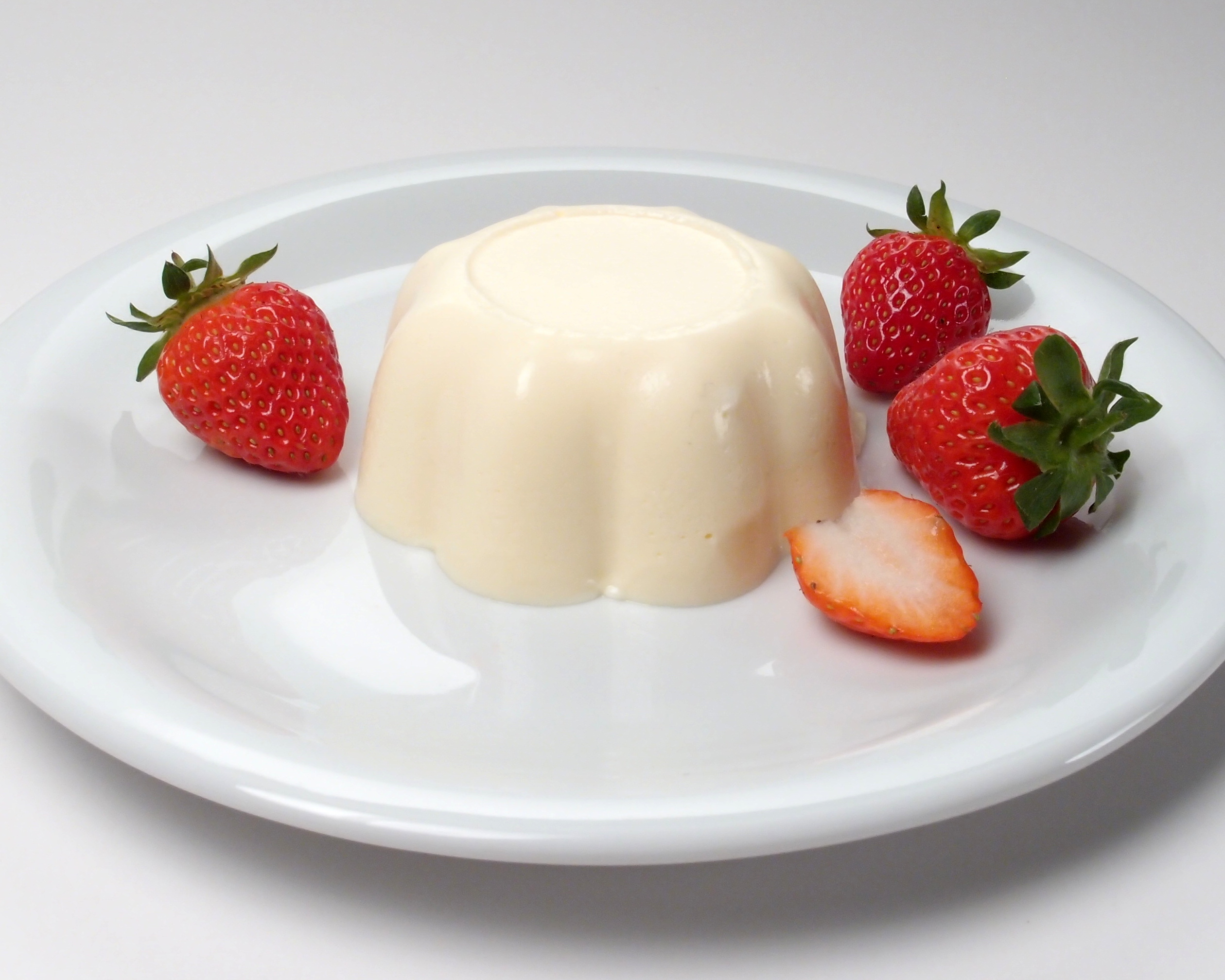
Bavarian cream with strawberries

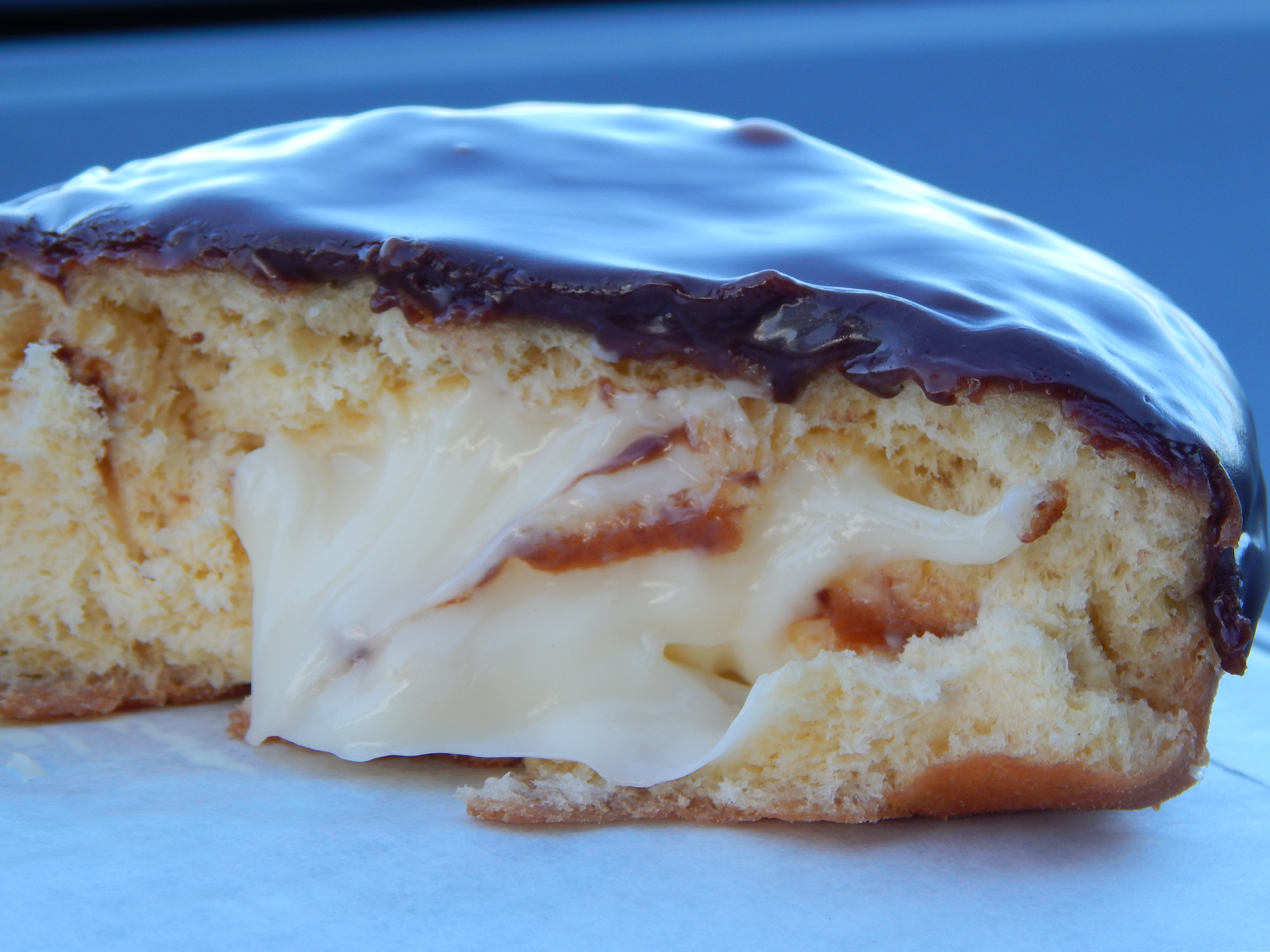
Bavarian crème bismark

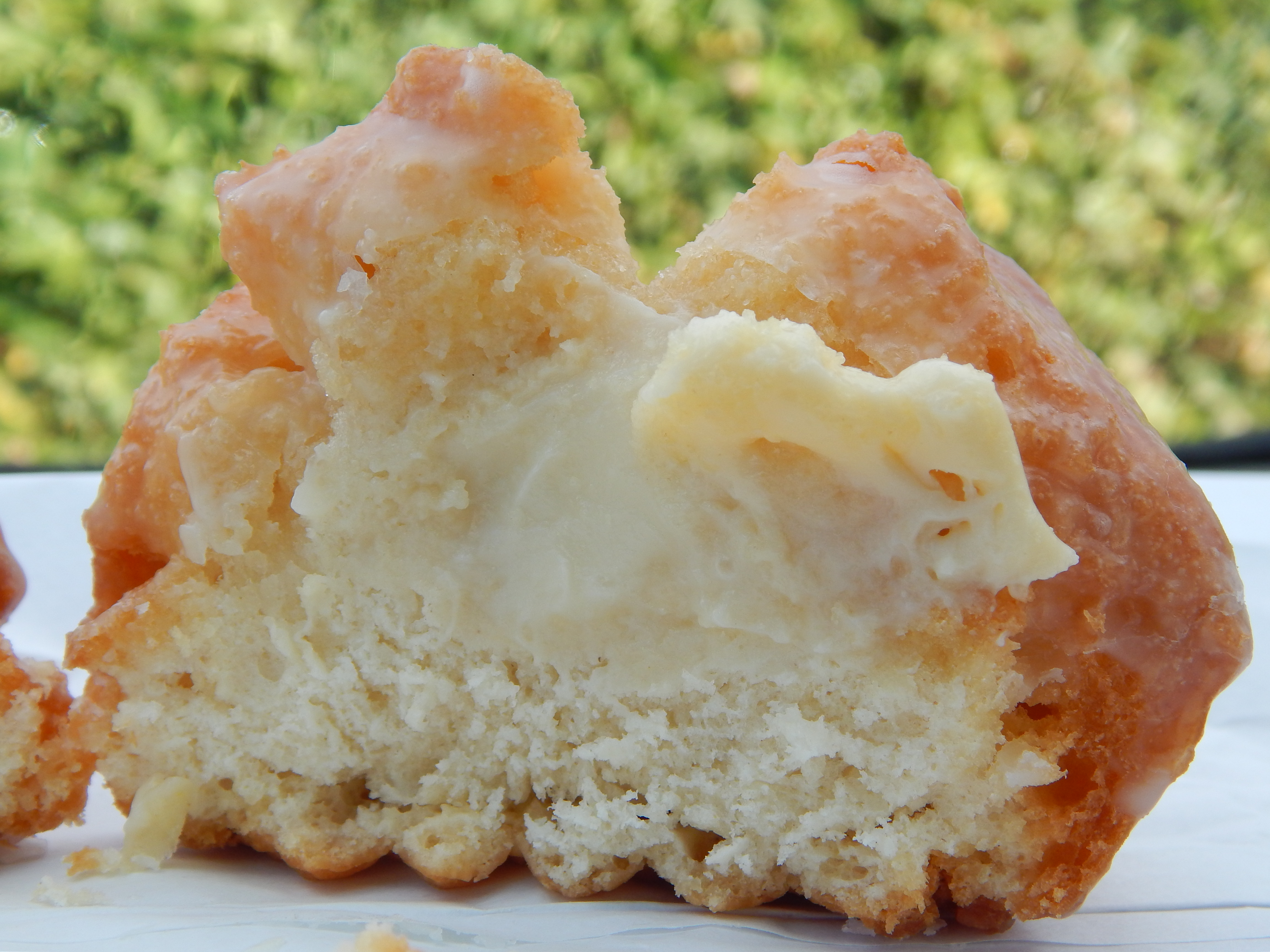
Bavarian creme buttermilk doughnut

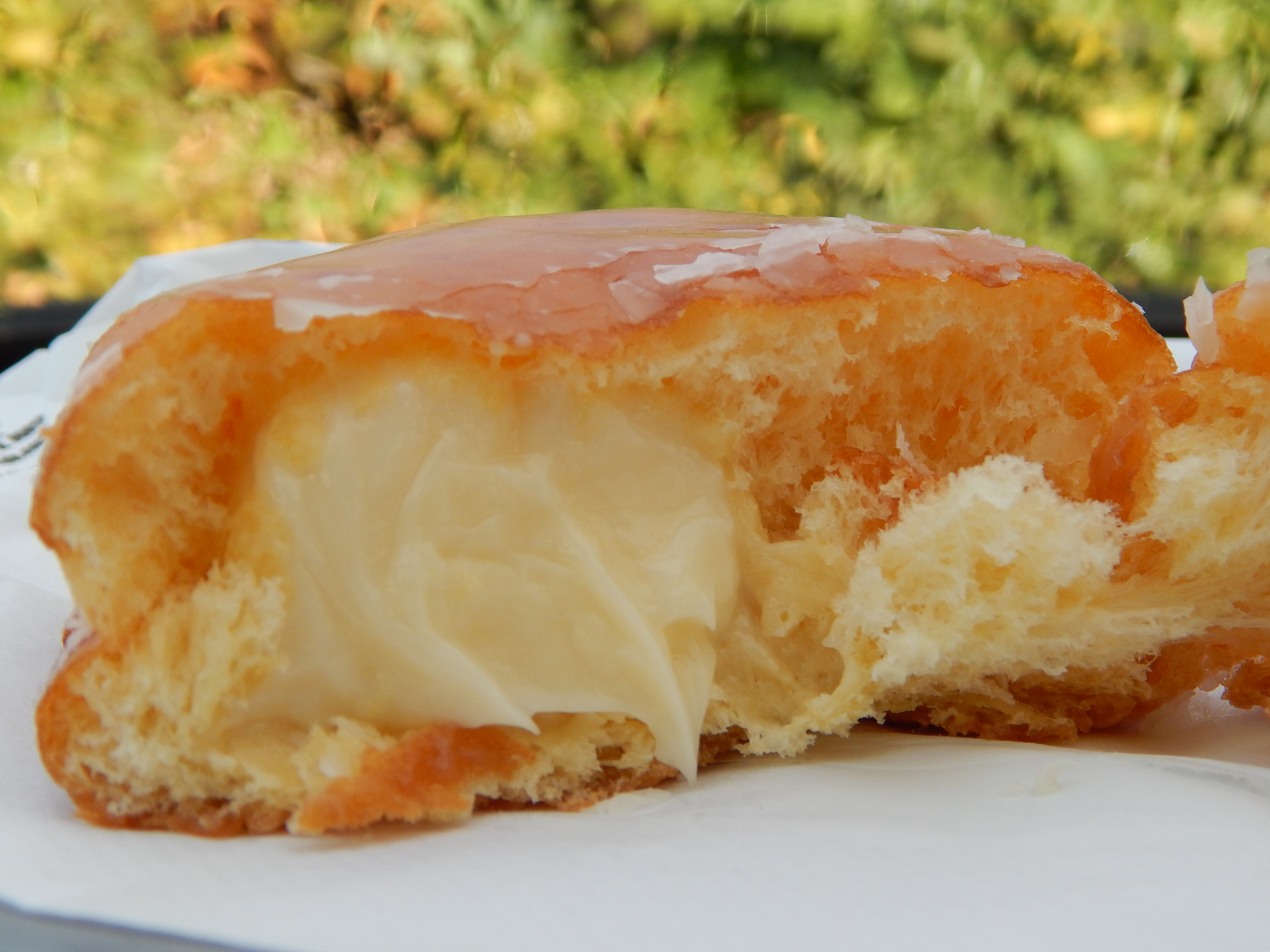
Bavarian creme glazed doughnut

== See also ==
- List of custard desserts, mostly using eggs and not gelatin
- Panna cotta, made with gelatine but not eggs or whipped cream
- List of German desserts
