= Emma Pike Ewing =

American author and educator

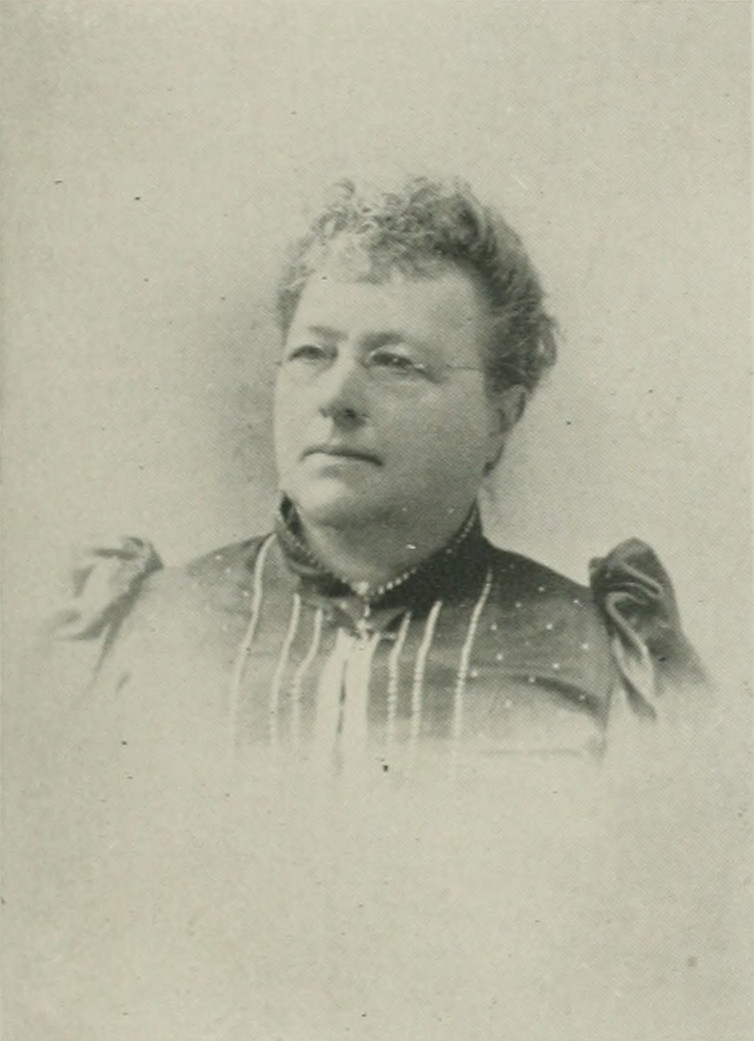
- Photo in A Woman of the Century
- Born: Emma Pike; July 1838; Broome County, New York, U.S.
- Died: February 1917 (aged 78)
- Resting place: Rosemary Cemetery, Sarasota, Florida, U.S.
- Occupations: educator, author
- Spouses: Frederick Southgate Smith (m. 1856; died 1861); William Pinkney Ewing (m. 1863)
- Writing career
- Language: English
- Subject: cooking

Emma Pike Ewing (née, Pike; after first marriage, Smith; after second marriage, Ewing; July 1838 – February 1917) was an American author and educator on housekeeping and cooking. Ewing hailed from New York. After the American Civil War, she served as dean, Chautauqua Assembly Cooking School; professor domestic economy, Iowa Agricultural College; director Model School of Household Economics; and affiliated with Marietta College, Ohio, Model Home School of Household Economics. Her contemporaries included, Mary Johnson Bailey Lincoln, Marion Harland, Fannie Merritt Farmer, Sarah Tyson Rorer, Maria Parloa, Gesine Lemcke, Ella Morris Kretschmar, and Linda Hull Larned. Ewing was the author of several cookbooks such as Cooking and Castle-building (1880), Soup and Soup Making (1882), Bread and Bread Making (1883), Salad and Salad Making (1884), A Text-book of Cookery, for Use in Schools (1899), Cookery Manuals (1890), and The Art of Cookery: A Manual for Homes and Schools (1896).

== Early life ==
Emma Pike was born on a farm in Colesville, Broome County, New York, in July 1838, (July 1828 is also mentioned).

== Career ==
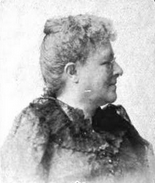
Emma P. Ewing

When she made her first home after marriage, she was an inexperienced young housewife. She knew nothing of cookery, but she saw the necessity of learning. There were no cooking schools and few cookbooks, but broad intelligence soon made Ewing a notable housewife, one who was constantly called upon for aid by neighbors who knew less than she did. In 1866, she became impressed with the belief that good food is an important factor in the development of the individual, morally, mentally and physically, and since then, the leading aim of her life was to improve people's diet by the introduction of better and more economical methods of cooking. Most of her culinary studies and experiments were in that direction.

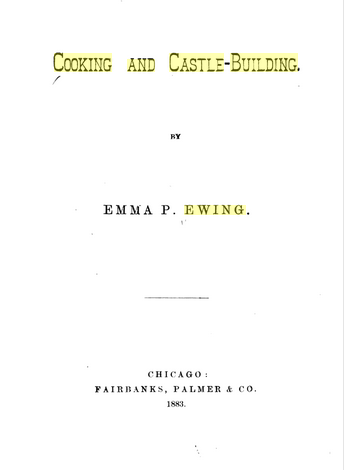
Cooking and Castle-building

As she solved one problem after another she put it into manuscript form. In 1880, James R. Osgood & Co of Boston brought out a small volume entitled Cooking and Castle Building. This book, written by Ewing, was in the form of a story, and discussed the vital importance of better homes and of improved methods of preparing food. Reviewers said of it that it was “well calculated to popularize cookery in its scientific aspects.” That cookery had scientific aspects was a new idea to most people, as it was then generally supposed that women possessed by nature an intuitive knowledge of how to keep house, and that cooks were “born cooks.”

In 1880, Ewing organized a school of cookery in Chicago and had conducted it for three years when she was appointed professor of domestic economy in the Iowa Agricultural College. She held that position until 1887, then resigned it to accept a similar one at a largely-increased salary at Purdue University in West Lafayette, Indiana. In the fall of 1889, Ewing resigned her professorship at Purdue and went to Kansas City, Missouri, to organize and take charge of a school of household science. Before she had been in Kansas City a year, Ewing received calls from across the country for lectures and lessons on culinary topics that became so incessant and urgent that she decided to leave the school, placing someone else in her position.

In 1881, a cooking school was opened in Chicago under the auspices of sixty prominent women of that city. Ewing was superintendent of this school, and during the first year gave courses of lectures upon the scientific principles underlying the proper preparation and cooking of food in five of the most prominent schools for young women in the city. These lectures were the subject of much newspaper comment, and in this way, Ewing became known as a teacher of cookery.

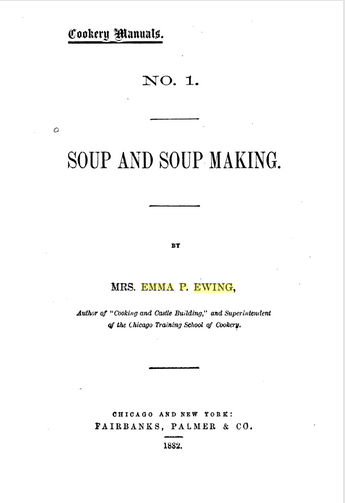
Soup and Soup Making

Soup and Soup Making was published in 1882. In that year, the trustees of the Iowa agricultural college invited Ewing to take charge of the department left vacant by the resignation of Mrs Welch. She accepted the invitation, in consequence of which the Chicago school was abandoned, because no woman capable of carrying it on satisfactorily could be found to take her place.

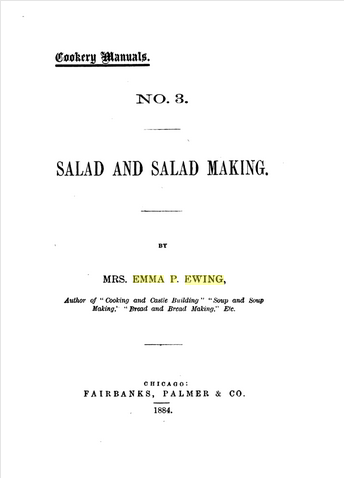
Salad and Salad Making

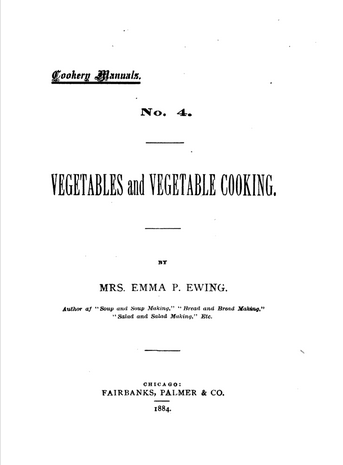
Vegetables and Vegetable Cooking

In 1883, she published a simple manual about bread-making. In the same year, the department of the Iowa college was enlarged, renamed the “School of Domestic Economy,” and placed upon a level with the other schools comprising the college. At the same time it was ordered by the trustees that Ewing should be given the title of Professor of Domestic Economy. In the same year, at the solicitation of Bishop John H. Vincent, Ewing opened a summer cooking school at Chautauqua, New York, which she conducted as its dean every July and August, until 1900; every season she delivered a series of lectures there on household topics. Salad and Salad Making and Vegetables and Vegetable Cooking were published in 1884.

In 1887, Ewing was connected with the Iowa State Agricultural College at Ames. In that year, the trustees of Purdue university, Indiana, after a careful investigation of the school of domestic economy in the Iowa college, decided to open a similar department in their university. They offered Ewing an increased compensation to take charge of this school. She accepted the offer and conducted it until 1891, when she resigned for the purpose of entering a field of labor in which she could work upon a broader scope and methods.

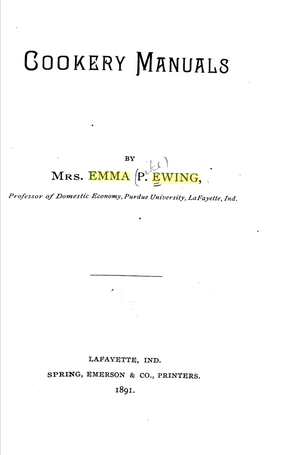
Cookery Manuals

Cookery Manuals was published in 1890. During 1891, she gave nearly 250 lectures and lessons on the preparation of food. In the following year, an association was formed in Chicago, called the National Household Economic Association. In 1893, this organization was enlarged. Under its auspices, Ewing gave free lessons in bread-making in the “model kitchen" of the women's building at the World's Fair.

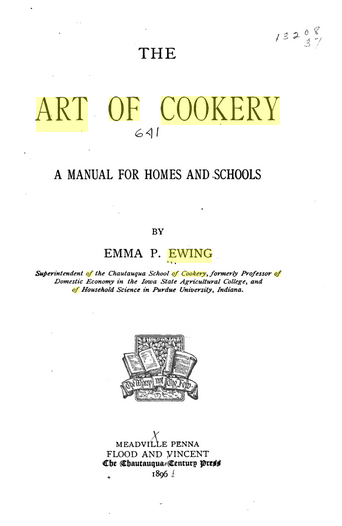
The Art of Cookery: A Manual for Homes

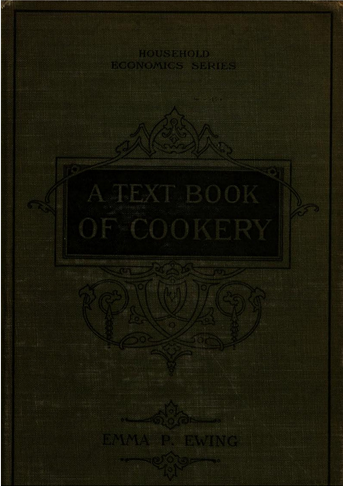
A Text-book of Cookery: For Use in Schools

The Art of Cookery: A Manual for Homes was published in 1896, and A Text-book of Cookery: For Use in Schools in the following year. In 1898, Ewing founded the Model Home School of Household Economics, which was affiliated Marietta College of Ohio. The normal course extended over two years. Associated with Ewing were, Helen M. Rathbun, manager of the model home: Maud E. Pike, principal of practical instruction; and Elizabeth M. Oakley, superintendent of practice kitchen. The new venture prospered, and the result was a similar institute in Syracuse, New York, over which Ewing presided.

== Personal life ==
She married her first husband, Frederick Southgate Smith, on October 29, 1856, in Washington, D.C. He was son of Henry and Arixene (Southgate) Smith, grandson of Rev. John Smith and Dr. Robert Southgate and was born in Portland, Maine January 26, 1817. Frederick Southgate Smith was a Civil Engineer who held office in the Patent Office at Washington D.C., where he and Emma lived. Emma and Frederick had only one child, Frederick Pike Smith, born on October 6, 1857, in Colesville, New York and the three of them lived in Washington, D.C. until Frederick Sr. resigned due to ill-health. He died of consumption at his wife's family's Colesville home on October 17, 1861. After being widowed, Emma changed her son's surname from Smith to Southgate which was her husband's mother's maiden name.

After her second marriage, Ewing lived in Washington, D.C., New York City, Chicago, Illinois, and other cities. Her contemporaries included, Mary Johnson Bailey Lincoln, Marion Harland, Fannie Merritt Farmer, Sarah Tyson Rorer, Maria Parloa, Gesine Lemcke, Ella Morris Kretschmar, and Linda Hull Larned.

== Death and legacy ==
Ewing died in February 1917, and is buried in Rosemary Cemetery, Sarasota, Florida.

The Emma P. Ewing papers for the period of 1888-1892 are held by the Purdue University Libraries, Archives and Special Collections.

== Selected works ==
- 1880, Cooking and Castle-building
- 1882, Soup and Soup Making
- 1883, Bread and Bread Making
- 1884, Salad and Salad Making
- 1884, Vegetables and Vegetable Cooking
- 1899, A Text-book of Cookery, for Use in Schools
- 1890, Cookery Manuals
- 1896, The Art of Cookery: A Manual for Homes and Schools
