= List of people from Calderdale =

This is a list of people from Calderdale, a metropolitan borough of West Yorkshire, England. This list includes people who pre-date the creation of Calderdale, from the towns of Brighouse, Elland, Halifax, Sowerby Bridge, Hebden Bridge, Todmorden, and the smaller villages that make up the borough. This list is arranged alphabetically by surname:

Table of contents:
A B C D E F G H I J K L M N O P Q R S T U V W X Y Z
Without biographies • See also • References

== A ==
- Dicken Ashworth, Todmorden-born actor

== B ==
- Tom Bailey (born 1954), singer, songwriter, composer and musician for the band The Thompson Twins was born in Halifax.
- Christopher Paul Baker (born 1955), award-winning travel writer, photographer, and adventure motorcyclist from Brighouse; currently living in Palm Springs, California
- Paul Barker (writer) (1935–2019), journalist and writer, grew up in Mytholmroyd and Hebden Bridge
- Antony Booth (1931–2017), actor and father of Cherie Blair; married to Stephanie Booth, a politician local to Calderdale; lived in Todmorden
- John Burnett (1935–2022), rugby league player, born in Halifax

== C ==
- Anita Carey (1948–2023), actress, born in Halifax and raised in Brighouse
- Chipps Chippendale (born 1968), mountain biking journalist from Todmorden
- Keith Clifford (born 1938), actor, born in Halifax
- Dario Coates (born 1992), actor from Hebden Bridge
- John Cockcroft (1897–1967), Todmorden-born scientist who won the Nobel Prize for Physics in 1951
- Hannah Cockroft (born 1992), wheelchair racer, born in Halifax
- Neil Cowie (born 1967), Rugby League player for Wigan, Wales and Great Britain from Todmorden
- Brian Crabtree, wrestler and referee from Halifax
- Max Crabtree (1933–2023), wrestler and promoter, born in Halifax
- Shirley Crabtree (1930–1997), wrestler, born in Halifax
- Charles Crossland (1844–1916), mycologist, born in Halifax
- Roy Crossley (1923–2003), footballer, born in Hebden Bridge
- Russell Crossley (1927–2018), English footballer, born in Hebden Bridge

== D ==
- Divina de Campo, a British drag queen and singer best known for appearing on the first season of RuPaul's Drag Race UK, born in Brighouse
- James Draper (settler) (c. 1622–1694), colonial Massachusetts settler, born in Heptonstall
- Joe Duttine (born 1970), actor, born in Halifax.

== E ==
- Avril Elgar (1932–2021), actress, born in Halifax.
- Keith Emerson (1944–2016), pianist, founder and member of The Nice and Emerson, Lake & Palmer, born in Todmorden

== F ==
- Jonathan Fairbanks (1594–1668), colonist from Heptonstall
- Oliver Farnworth (born 1982), actor from Hebden Bridge
- Kenneth Fiddling (1917–1992), English cricketer born in Hebden Bridge
- John Fielden (1784–1849), land and factory owner in Todmorden; Member of Parliament; national leader of the Ten Hours Campaign for factory reform; scion of the Fielden family
- Adam Fogerty (born 1969), actor, boxer, and rugby league player, born in Halifax
- John Foster (1770–1843), English Baptist minister and essayist born in Halifax

== H ==
- Jessica Harris (born 1981), actress from Hebden Bridge
- Eric Harrison (1938–2019), Mytholmroyd-born football coach for the Manchester United youth team during the reign of Alex Ferguson
- John Helliwell (born 1945), Todmorden-born musician of the band Supertramp
- Dale Hibbert, original bass player with The Smiths and author, born in Todmorden
- Ursula Holden-Gill (born 1974), TV actress (Emmerdale, Holby City, Teachers, The Bill)
- William Holt (1897–1977), Todmorden-born writer, painter, political activist, journalist and traveller
- Ted Hughes (1930–1998), Poet Laureate, born in Mytholmroyd
- Neil Hurst (born 1982), actor and comedian from Halifax

== I ==
- Barrie Ingham (1932–2023), actor, born in Halifax
- Bernard Ingham (1932–2023), journalist and civil servant, born in Halifax
- Innes Ireland (1930–1993), Formula One racing driver (1960s and 1970s), born in Mytholmroyd

== J ==
- Jollyboat, musical comedy double-act, of Todmorden brothers Tommy and Ed Croft
- Wilfred Judson (1902–1980), former Justice of the Supreme Court of Canada, born in Todmorden

== K ==
- Jason Kay, singer from the band Jamiroquai, owns a 'country retreat' (actually a small terraced house) in Todmorden
- John Kettley (born 1952), BBC weatherman, from Todmorden
- Julie Kirkbride (born 1960), Member of Parliament for Bromsgrove from 1997 to 2010

== L ==
- Paula Lane (born 1986), actress born in Hebden Bridge
- Fred Lawless, Liverpool born theatre playwright, has a house in Todmorden; was a writer for the BBC 1 TV series EastEnders and other TV and radio programmes
- Peter Lever (born 1940), England test cricketer, from Todmorden
- Anne Lister (born 1791), diarist
- John Lister (born 1847), politician
- Walter Livsey (1884–1978), Todmorden-born Hampshire wicketkeeper
- Alice Longstaff (1907 - 1992), photographer
- Adrian Love (1944–1999), World Service, Capital Radio and Radio 2 DJ
- Geoff Love (1917–1991), big band leader, born in Todmorden
- Jane Lumb (1942–2008), actress and fashion model of the 1960s, born in Mytholmroyd

== M ==
- Andrew Harwood Mills (born 1980), actor, born in Halifax
- Harry Mortimer (1902–1992), composer and conductor, born in Hebden Bridge
- Lizzie Mayland (born 1999), vocalist and guitarist for The Last Dinner Party, from Hebden Bridge

== N ==
- James Needham (1849–1913), mycologist and iron moulder from Hebden Bridge
- John Mitchell Nuttall (1890–1958), Todmorden-born physicist remembered for the Geiger–Nuttall law

== O ==
- Katie Ormerod, Olympic snowboarder from Brighouse

== P ==
- Wilfred Pickles (1904–1978), radio personality, born in Halifax.
- Eric Portman (1901–1969), film and television actor, born in Ackroydon

== R ==
- John Ramsbottom (1814–1897), mechanical engineer and inventor from Todmorden

== S ==
- Lavena Saltonstall (1881–1957), English suffragette and writer, from Hebden Bridge
- Derek Shackleton (born 1924), England test cricketer, from Todmorden
- Miles Balmford Sharp (1897–1973), artist
- Percy Shaw (1890–1976), inventor of the cat's eye
- Ed Sheeran (born 1991), born in Hebden Bridge
- Harold Shipman (1946–2004), serial killer, took up his first GP's position at the Abraham Ormerod Centre in Todmorden
- Oliver Smithies (born 1925), U.S. geneticist and Nobel prizewinner, born in Halifax

== T ==
- Rebecca Taylor, Liberal Democrat MEP for Yorkshire and the Humber, born in Todmorden
- Grenville Turner (born 1936), a pioneer of cosmochemistry, from Todmorden

== W ==
- Sally Wainwright, screenwriter. Wrote several episodes of Coronation Street before going on to create At Home with the Braithwaites, Scott & Bailey and Happy Valley (TV series). Raised in Sowerby Bridge
- Geoffrey Wilkinson (1921–1996), won the Nobel Prize for Chemistry in 1973, from Todmorden
- David Wilson, footballer who began his career at Manchester United (1980s)

== Y ==
- Barbara Young (1931–2023), actress, born in Brighouse

== See also ==
- List of people from West Yorkshire
