= Jonathan Schofield =

Rugby league player, coach, & executive

Personal information
- Full name: Jonathan Schofield

Playing information
Club
Years	Team	Pld	T	G	FG	P
2009	Hunslet Hawks	1	0	3	0	6
2009–10	York City Knights	7	9	8	0	38
2012–2014	Dewsbury Rams	14	3	0	1	13
	Total	22	12	11	1	57

Coaching information
Club
Years	Team	Gms	W	D	L	W%
2017	Dewsbury Rams
2019	Hunslet Warriors
	Total	0	0	0	0
- Source: As of 26 May 2020

Jonathan Schofield is the current general manager of Super League club Wakefield Trinity. He is a former professional rugby league player and coach.

== Background ==
He is the son of former Hull F.C., Leeds and Great Britain player Garry Schofield.

== Playing career ==
=== Early career ===
Schofield spent time in the Leeds Rhinos and Castleford Tigers academy systems.

=== Hunslet Hawks ===
Schofield joined League 1 outfit, Hunslet for the 2009 season. He kicked 3 goals on his debut in a victory over London Skolars. Despite a solid performance, Schofield did not retain his place in the side. He was allowed to leave the club in July 2009 without adding to his solitary appearance.

=== York City Knights ===
York City Knights announced the double signing of Schofield and future super league star Tom Lineham in July 2009.

Ironically, his first Knights appearance came against London Skolars who he had debuted against for Hunslet earlier that same season. He scored 2 tries and kicked 8 goals as the Knights romped to a 64–0 victory. After such an impressive debut it came as a surprise to many when he was not named in the squad for the next game. He did not feature again for the first team that campaign.

He scored 7 tries in 6 appearances during the Knights' 2010 promotion-winning season. He was not included in the team for any of the play-off games and left the club at the end of the season.

=== Dewsbury Rams ===
Schofield signed for Dewsbury Rams in 2012. He played for the club for three seasons before taking up a role on the coaching staff.

== Post-playing career ==
=== Dewsbury Rams ===
Schofield took up a position as player-coach of the Dewsbury Rams reserves ahead of the 2015 season. He enjoyed early success in the role, leading the team to the 2015 Reserves Championship in his first season in charge.

In 2017, Schofield was appointed interim head coach along with Karl Pryce following the sacking of Glenn Morrison. Schofield's time in charge proved to be short-lived: The Rams appointed Neil Kelly as their new head coach less than a month later. Kelly quickly deemed Schofield to be surplus to requirements and fired him in order to bring in his own backroom staff.

=== Hunslet Warriors ===
In February 2019 Schofield was named head coach of National Conference League division 3 outfit Hunslet Warriors. The Warriors finished 2nd earning promotion to National conference division 2 in Schofield's first season in charge.

=== Wakefield Trinity ===
Schofield was named permanent general manager of super league side Wakefield Trinity in November 2019.
