= Boston Cooking School =

- 158 1/2 Tremont Street, Boston, Massachusetts

Information
- Established: March 10, 1879, Incorporated 1882
- Founders: Women’s Education Association of Boston
- Principal: Mary Johnson Bailey Lincoln 1879 - 1885
- Principal: Miss Ida Maynard & Mrs. Carrie M. Dearborn 1885 - 1888
- Principal: Fannie Merritt Farmer 1889 - 1902
- Information: In 1902, the Boston Cooking School became part of Boston's Simmons College.

The Boston Cooking School was founded in 1879 by the Women’s Education Association of Boston (Note: Not to be confused with the Women's Educational and Industrial Union.) "to offer instruction in cooking to those who wished to earn their livelihood as cooks, or who would make practical use of such information in their families." The school became famous following the 1896 publication of The Boston Cooking-School Cook Book by its principal at the time, Fannie Merritt Farmer.

== Founding ==
The idea for the school was first proposed by Association member Mrs. Sarah E. Hooper, who had observed the teaching of cookery at London's National School of Cookery, while passing through that city on her return from an extended trip to Australia. (Note: The National School of Cookery, Exhibition Road, South Kensington, London had been founded in 1873 as The Popular School of Cookery.) She persuaded the Association to authorize $100 to launch a similar school in Boston; The Boston Cooking School opened on March 10, 1879, at 158½ Tremont Street.

The first teacher was Miss Joanna Sweeney (about whom little is now known), who was engaged to teach the "normal classes" in basic cooking. Tuition was purposefully kept low: $1.50 for six lessons. To cater to upper-class women (and their cooks), Maria Parloa (Note: Maria Parloa had founded her own private "Miss Parloa's School of Cooking" at 174 Tremont Street in the fall of 1877. Parloa closed her Boston school in the spring of 1882, and opened a similar school in New York City the following November. Parloa was not the founder of the Boston Cooking School, as is sometimes asserted.) was engaged to give lecture / demonstrations of more advanced cookery on alternate Saturdays. Mary Johnson Bailey Lincoln (Mrs. David A.) was invited to teach at the school in November, 1879; she later became the school's first principal.

Following its successful start, the school was incorporated in 1882 as the Boston Cooking School Corporation; its first president was Mrs. Hooper.

== History ==
In 1884, Roberts Brothers of Boston published Mrs. Lincoln's Boston Cook Book: What to Do and What Not to Do in Cooking. According to Lincoln, "This was done primarily to meet the need of a textbook for our pupils and save the copying of recipes."

During Mary Lincoln's tenure, the Boston Cooking School instituted a number of special programs. In 1880, the School joined forces with the Industrial Aid Society to offer free cooking classes in Boston's primarily-immigrant North End. Special courses on nutrition were organized for students at the Harvard Medical School; classes on "sick-room cookery" were offered to nurses from several hospitals in Boston, as well as Concord, NH.

Special lectures were given from time to time on topics ranging from anatomy and digestion by noted Boston physicians, to marketing "by those experienced in that work." Most noteworthy were lectures on the subject of food chemistry by Ellen H. Richards, the first woman to earn a degree from the Massachusetts Institute of Technology, and the first woman in America to earn a degree in chemistry. Richards later became a leader in the founding of the Home Economics movement in the United States.

Mrs. Lincoln served as principal until January, 1885, when a death in her family necessitated her resignation. Subsequent principals included Miss Ida Maynard, and Mrs. Carrie M. Dearborn, both graduates of the school.

In 1889, Miss Fannie Merritt Farmer was invited to remain after her own graduation to serve as assistant principal to Mrs. Dearborn; she became principal following Mrs. Dearborn's death in 1891. Five years later, the first edition of Farmer's Boston Cooking-School Cook Book was published by Little, Brown & Co. of Boston. Farmer is credited for using scientific methods and establishing the exact level measurement method. The book quickly became an American classic, and is still in print today.

In 1902, the Boston Cooking School became part of Boston's Simmons College.

== Legacy ==
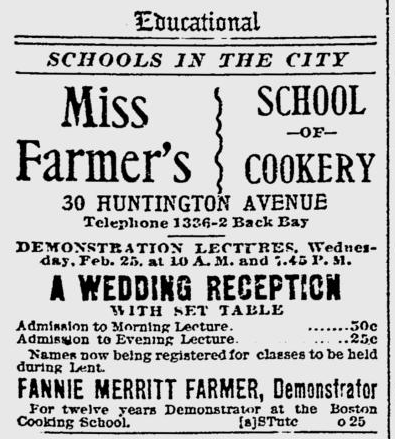

Fannie Farmer left the Boston Cooking School in 1902, and subsequently opened Miss Farmer's School of Cookery, located in Huntington Chambers, 30 Huntington Avenue, Boston. (Note: A detailed "Announcement of Courses" at Miss Farmer's School may be found in editions of The Boston Cooking-School Cook Book after this date. For example: (Boston: Little, Brown & Company, 1917), p 607-616.)

After Fannie Farmer's death in 1915 at the age of 57, Alice Bradley became the owner and principal of the school until 1944.

== See also ==
- Anna Barrows, early 20th century cooking lecturer, an alumna
- Alice Bradley Boston Women's Heritage Trail
