= Lavena Saltonstall =

English suffragette (1881–1957)

- Born: 1881; Rawholme, Hebden Bridge, Yorkshire, England
- Died: September 1957 (aged 75–76); Bradford, Yorkshire, England
- Occupation: Suffragette
- Organization(s): Women's Labour League, Women's Social and Political Union, Women's Education Association
- Spouse: George Baker (m. 1917)

Lavena Saltonstall (1881 – September 1957) was an English suffragette, working class campaigner and writer.

== Early life ==
Saltonstall was born in 1881 in Rawholme, just outside Hebden Bridge to Mary and John Saltonstall, a fustian dyer. When she was around 10 years old, she left school to work half-time in the local clothing factories.

== Career ==
In 1907, Saltonstall led a weavers' strike in Hebden Bridge and addressed the striking workers from the steps of Bridge Mill, before the women workers marched to the houses of their employers. During 1907 and 1908, she invited the founder of the WSPU, Emmeline Pankhurst to give speeches locally in support of the strike and about votes for women.

When Saltonstall was around 23 years old, she moved to Halifax after finding the small-town of Hebden Bridge restricting. While living in Halifax, she became involved with the local Women's Labour League and the local Women's Social and Political Union (WSPU), and became friends with fellow suffragette Laura Annie Willson.

In March 1907, Saltonstall travelled to Westminster to campaign for enfranchisement and was arrested and imprisoned for 14 days. In February 1908, she attended the WSPU’s Women’s Parliament in London and was arrested again after refusing to be bound over to keep the peace for 12 months, for which she was sentenced to 6 months imprisonment. After her time in prison, Saltonstall started to distance herself from the WSPU and instead focused more on the working class and Labour movements. She did, however, take part in the suffragette boycott of the 1911 census.

Saltonstall turned to the Women's Education Association (WEA) to catch up on the education she missed due to leaving school at such a young age. She studied economics, and took part in a summer school in 1911 held at the University of Oxford, where she debated philosophy with her academic tutors, shot back at criticisms of the initiative from the press and denounced the housing conditions that were available to the servants who worked maintaining the university.

Through the WEA, Saltonstall also raised awareness of how working in the day and doing housework in the evenings prevented many working class women from participating in political activity, explaining how: "in my native place the women, as a general rule, wash every Monday, iron on Tuesdays, court on Wednesdays, bake on Thursdays, clean on Fridays go to market or go courting again on Saturdays and go to Church on Sundays."

She became a talented and prolific letter writer to various local newspapers, and later wrote a regular WEA corner column called "The Letters of a Tailoress" for the Halifax Guardian. Here, she wrote about the societal expectations and restraints on working class women, saying that "As I am a tailoress many people think it is my bounded duty to make trousers and vests…and thank God for my station in life… The exceptions are considered unwomanly and eccentric people".

== Later life ==
In 1917, Saltonstall married a soldier, George Baker, at the Unitarian Chapel, Halifax. She moved with him to Bradford, where she died in September 1957.

== Legacy ==
A blue plaque is displayed in the window of the house on Unity Street, Hebden Bridge where Saltonstall used to live.
