= List of people from West Yorkshire =

The list of people from West Yorkshire, in northern England, is divided by metropolitan borough. West Yorkshire is a metropolitan county created in 1974 and so people from the area before this year were from the earlier West Riding of Yorkshire.

1. Leeds
2. Wakefield
3. Kirklees
4. Calderdale
5. Bradford
