= List of people from Kirklees =

This is a list of people from Kirklees, a metropolitan district in West Yorkshire, England. This list includes people from Batley, Birstall, Cleckheaton, Denby Dale, Dewsbury, Heckmondwike, Holmfirth, Huddersfield, Kirkburton, Marsden, Meltham, Mirfield and Slaithwaite. The list is arranged alphabetically by surname:

Table of contents:

A B C D E F G H I J K L M N O P Q R S T U V W X Y Z

== A ==
- Simon Armitage – poet, novelist and playwright, born in Marsden

== B ==
- James Berry – executioner who hanged 131 people, born in Heckmondwike
- Tracy Brabin – television writer, television, film & theatre actor, politician; born in Batley and attended Heckmondwike Grammar School.
- Sharon Brogden – (1966–) – voice actor, author and businesswoman, born in Mirfield
- Sir David Brown (1904–1993) – managing director of David Brown Ltd, owner of Aston Martin Ltd, born in Huddersfield
- Jeff Butterfield – international rugby union player; British Lion, 1955; born in Heckmondwike

== C ==
- Roy Castle - versatile stage and TV entertainer, born in Scholes, Holmfirth
- Alan Chesters (1989–2003) – Bishop of Blackburn, born in Huddersfield
- Paul Copley (25 November 1944–) – English actor and voice-over artist born in Denby Dale
- Albert Craig – known as the "Surrey Poet", wrote poems on cricket and football, born and raised in Meltham.

== H ==
- Edward Ramsden Hall – motor racing driver, born in Milnsbridge
- Roger Hargreaves – author and illustrator of children's books, including Mr Men series, born in Cleckheaton
- Sir Harold Percival Himsworth – medical scientist, worked on diabetes, born in Huddersfield
- Lena Headey
- George Herbert Hirst - cricketer for Yorkshire and England, born in Huddersfield
- Percy Holmes - cricketer for Yorkshire and England, born in Huddersfield

== I ==
- Derek Ibbotson – athlete, set new world record for running a mile in 1957, born in Huddersfield

== K ==
- Gorden Kaye – comedic actor, René in Allo, Allo, born in Huddersfield

== M ==
- James Mason – film actor, born in Huddersfield

== P ==
- Joseph Priestley – theologian, natural philosopher, discoverer of oxygen, born in Birstall

== R ==
- Wilfred Rhodes - cricketer for Yorkshire and England, born in Huddersfield

== S ==
- Ryan Sidebottom – cricketer for Yorkshire and England, born in Huddersfield
- Patrick Stewart – film, stage and television actor, Captain Jean-Luc Picard in Star Trek: The Next Generation, born in Mirfield
- Frank Sykes – international rugby union player, born in Batley

== W ==
- Jodie Whittaker – film and television actor, born in Skelmanthorpe; attended Scissett Middle School and Shelley High School.
- Harold Wilson – politician, Labour Prime Minister 1964–1970 and 1974–1976, born in Huddersfield

== See also ==
- List of people from West Yorkshire
