= Marion Cunningham (author) =

American food writer (1922–2012)

- Born: Marion Enwright; February 7, 1922; Los Angeles, California, U.S.
- Died: July 11, 2012 (aged 90); Walnut Creek, California, U.S.
- Occupation: Food writer
- Years active: 1979–2012
- Notable work: The Fannie Farmer Cookbook, 12th and 13th editions; Fannie Farmer Baking Book; The Breakfast Book; The Supper Book
- Television: Cunningham & Company
- Spouse: Robert Cunningham (m. 1942-1988; his death)
- Children: 2

Marion Cunningham (née Enwright; February 7, 1922 – July 11, 2012) was an American food writer.

Cunningham was responsible for the 1979 and 1990 revisions of the Fannie Farmer Cookbook, and was the author of The Breakfast Book, The Supper Book, and Cooking with Children, among several others. She frequently traveled throughout America giving cooking demonstrations (some with James Beard); contributed articles to Bon Appetit, Food & Wine, and Gourmet magazines; wrote a regular column for the San Francisco Chronicle and the Los Angeles Times; and hosted a television series, Cunningham & Company, on the Food Network.

In 1993, Cunningham received the Grand Dame award from Les Dames d'Escoffier "in recognition and appreciation of her extraordinary achievement and contribution to the culinary arts." In 1994, she was named Scholar-in-Residence by the International Association of Culinary Professionals.

== Early life ==
She was born February 7, 1922, in Los Angeles, California to Joseph and Maryann (née Spelta) Enwright. Her mother was frail. Her father later became an invalid and an alcoholic. She graduated from high school in Los Angeles. After her 1942 marriage to Robert Cunningham, they moved to San Diego, where he served in the US Marine Corps. Robert became a medical malpractice lawyer and the couple settled in Walnut Creek, California.

== Homemaker ==
Before 1972, she spent most of her time as a homemaker and mother. She said of her husband's food sense, "He doesn't like homemade bread and he doesn't like vegetables. The only green thing he says he likes is money." They had two children, Mark and Catherine. She was afflicted with agoraphobia. She also overcame a drinking problem and then avoided alcohol entirely.

== Cooking ==
In 1972, when she was about 50 years old, she started on the path that would make her famous in the cooking world. She took a cooking class from James Beard. For the next 11 years, she became his assistant and she helped him establish cooking classes in the Bay Area. Upon Beard's recommendation, she was hired to rewrite the classic Fannie Farmer Cookbook for modern audiences. Her revisions were published in 1979 and 1990, respectively.

== Death ==
Cunningham died of respiratory problems, a complication of her Alzheimer's disease, at John Muir Medical Center in Walnut Creek, California, at the age of 90.
