= Lucretia Crocker =

American science educator

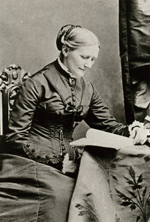
Lucretia Crocker, teacher.

Lucretia Crocker (December 31, 1829 – October 9, 1886) was an American science educator. Crocker founded the Women's Education Association in 1872.

== Early life ==
Although there is not much information available about Lucretia Crocker's childhood, we know that her family has long standing roots in New England. Researchers claim that her ancestors settled in the "Old Common Wealth" which is better known now as the state of Massachusetts. Crocker was born on 31 December in 1829, daughter of county sheriff and businessman Henry, and Lydia E. Crocker (née Ferris) in Barnstable, Massachusetts. Crocker had ancestors that had settled in the old Commonwealth. Throughout her adolescence she attended Boston public schools. Her family moved to Shawmut Avenue in Boston, where she attended the Normal School for Girls. The school system was established in Lexington, Mass in 1839. She then went on to graduate from the Massachusetts State Normal School in West Newton in 1850. Crocker graduating in 1850 indicates that she likely began her schooling at Massachusetts State Normal School in 1847 or 1848. She attended lectures by J. L. R. Agassiz at Harvard, although at the time women could only attend Harvard as guests. Crocker was progressive in her views on education as she promoted science and valued it as useful knowledge.

== Career ==
She taught at the State Normal School from 1850 to 1854 when she fell ill and resigned. After leaving Massachusetts she continued her teaching career in Ohio where she started a job as an educator, from 1857 to 1859, she was professor of mathematics and astronomy at Antioch College.

The State Normal school in West Newton moved to Framingham, Massachusetts in 1853. It is presently known as Framingham State College, and includes Crocker Hall, a building name in Lucretia Crocker's memory. The construction of this addition began in 1886, the year she died.

In 1859, she returned to Boston to care for her parents, and become involved in educational activities there at the Newbury Street School. From 1865 for some years she assisted in selecting the American Unitarian Association's Sunday School books. From 1866 to 1875 she was a member of the New England Freedman's Aid Society's Committee on Teaching.

In 1869, she toured the freedmen's schools. She was also teaching botany and mathematics in a private school at around this time.

Crocker founded the Women's Education Association, Boston, in 1872. She was elected to the Boston School Committee in 1873. From 1873 to about 1876 she was head of the science department of the Society to Encourage Studies at Home, serving on the board of school supervisors from 1876 to 1886.

Crocker died October 9, 1886, in Boston. Her home is featured on the Boston Women's Heritage Trail.

== Accomplishments ==
Throughout her life, Lucretia Crocker achieved various accomplishments as one of the first well known female educators in the United States. She was also the first woman elected into the Boston School Committee, and was the first female supervisor in the Boston Public Schools District. Additionally, she was an associate member of the Boston Society of Natural History. She was most well known for her teachings of mathematics and natural science. Around this time her and Mary L Hall co-authored her first book Our World (1864)., Crocker founded the Women's Education Association in 1872. From 1873 to 1876 she served as the Head of the Science Department of The Society to Encourage Studies at Home. This was also known as The Silent University. In addition she was also appointed as a member of the committee on Teacher's for the New England. In 1880 Crocker was elected to the America Association of Science. Crocker served the disabled as a member of the executive committee for the Boston School for Deaf Mutes. Later in life (1883), she wrote another book, Methods of Teaching Geography.

== Works ==
- Our World (1864)
- Methods of Teaching Geography (1883)
- Lessons on Color in Primary Schools (1883)
