= Andy Kelly (rugby league) =

England international rugby league footballer and coach

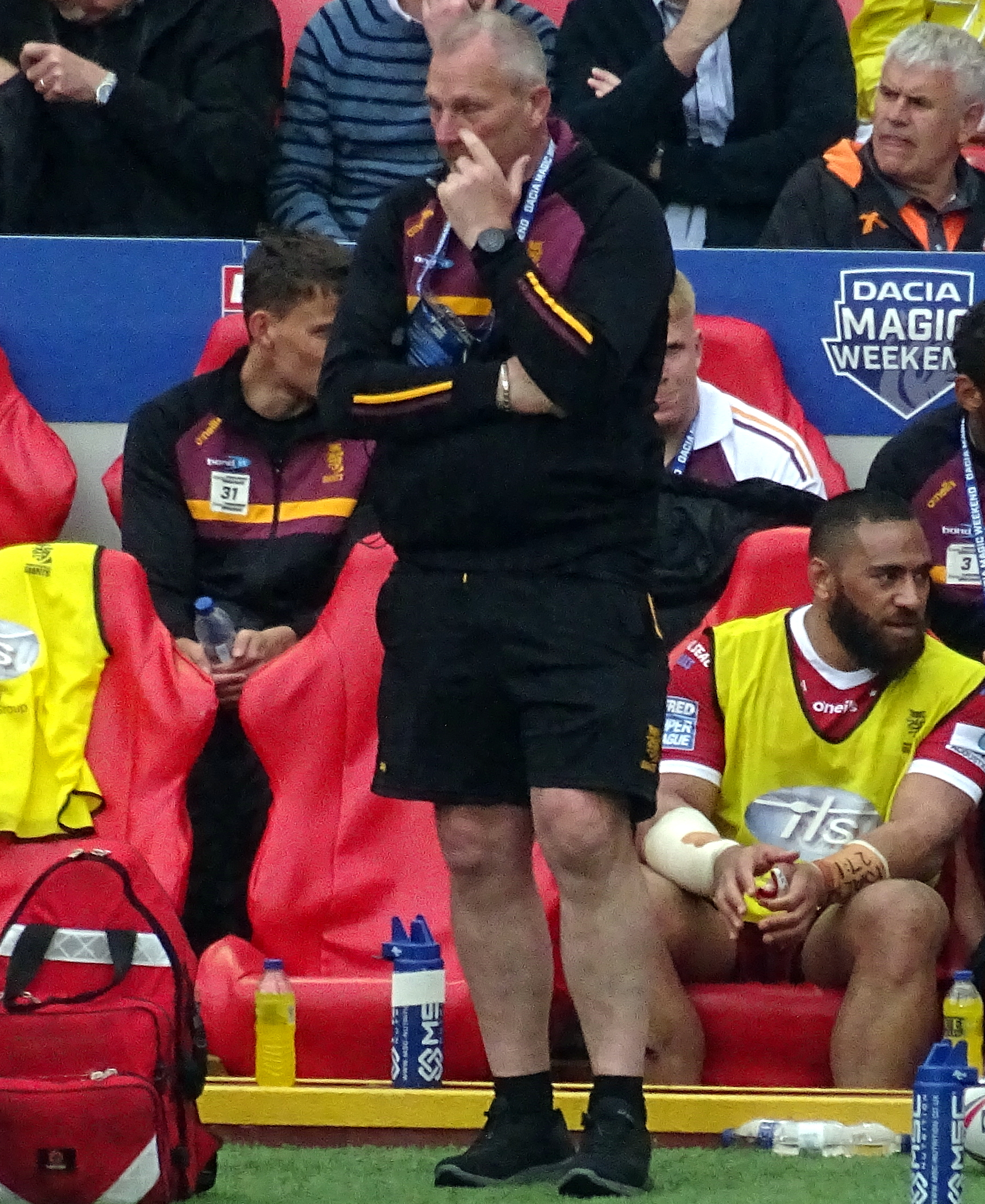

Personal information
- Full name: Andrew Kelly
- Born: 8 November 1960 (age 65) Wakefield, West Riding of Yorkshire, England
- Height: 6 ft 4 in (1.93 m)
- Weight: 17 st 4 lb (110 kg)

Playing information
- Position: Second-row
Club
Years	Team	Pld	T	G	FG	P
1980–82	Wakefield Trinity	46	15	0	0	42
1983–88	Hull Kingston Rovers	167	29	0	0	116
1989–93	Wakefield Trinity	109	15	0	0	40
	Total	322	59	0	0	198
Representative
Years	Team	Pld	T	G	FG	P
1984	England	1	0	0	0	0
1986	Yorkshire	1	0	0	0	0

Coaching information
Club
Years	Team	Gms	W	D	L	W%
1997–00	Wakefield Trinity	71	21	0	50	30
2001–02	Gateshead Thunder
2002–03	Featherstone Rovers	18	7	0	11	39
2003–08	Dewsbury Rams
2016	Huddersfield Giants	2	2	0	0	100
	Total	91	30	0	61	33
Representative
Years	Team	Gms	W	D	L	W%
1998–11	Ireland	24	10	2	12	42
- Source: As of 19 April 2026
- Relatives: Neil Kelly (brother); Richard Kelly (brother)

Andy Kelly (born 8 November 1960), also known by the nicknames of "Boot", and "Big Andy", is an English former professional rugby league footballer who played in the 1980s and 1990s, and the interim head coach of the Huddersfield Giants in the Super League.

He played at representative level for England, and at club level for Wakefield Trinity (two spells) (captain), Hull Kingston Rovers and the Illawarra Steelers (unused substitute in the 24–8 victory over Cronulla-Sutherland Sharks at Endeavour Field, Sydney on Sunday 24 June 1984), as a second-row, and has coached at representative level for Ireland, and at club level for Wakefield Trinity/Wakefield Trinity Wildcats, Gateshead Thunder, Featherstone Rovers and the Dewsbury Rams.

== Background ==
Andy Kelly was born in Wakefield, West Riding of Yorkshire, England.

== Playing career ==
=== Hull Kingston Rovers ===
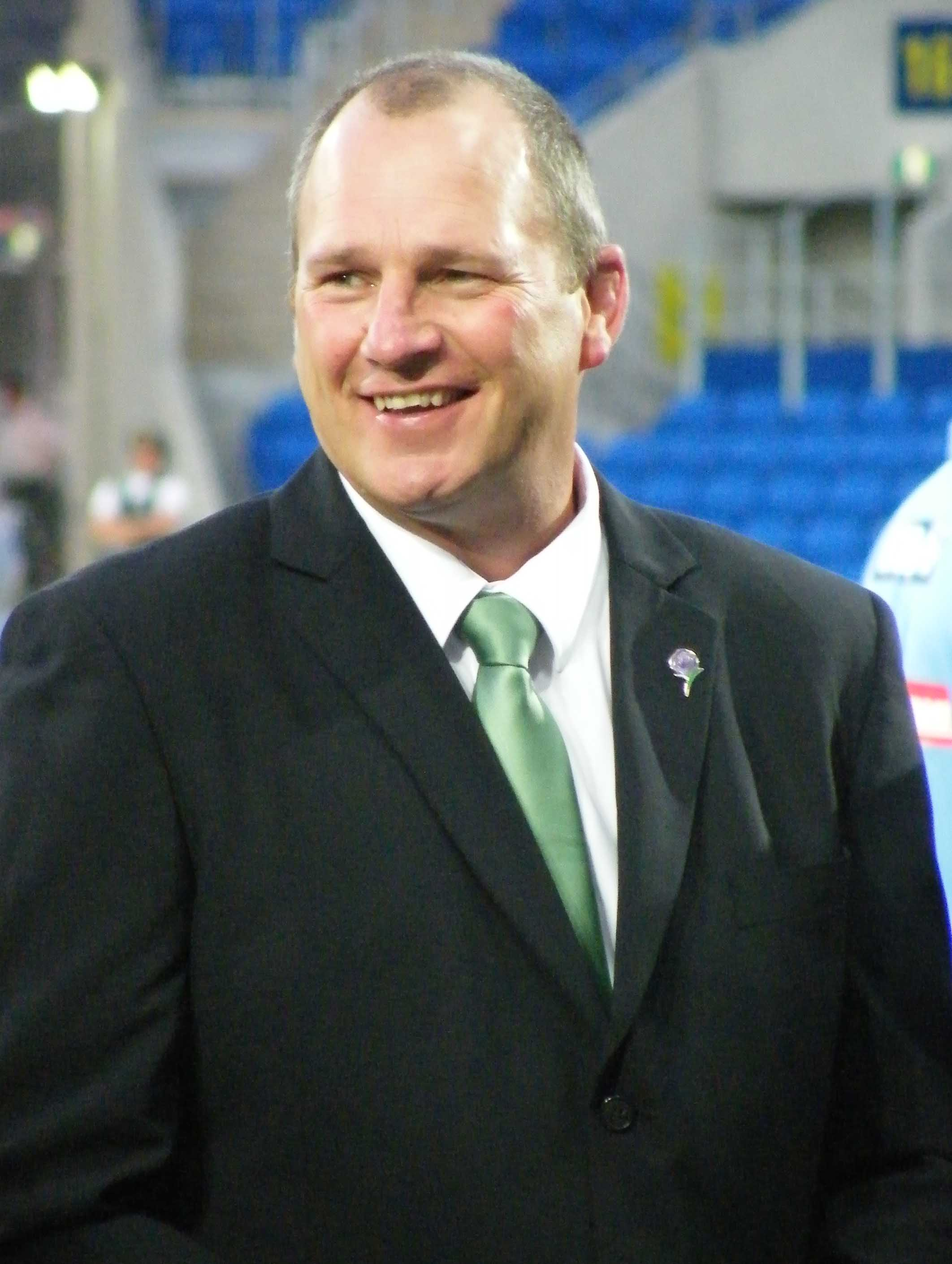
Kelly coaching Ireland at the 2008 RLWC

Kelly played at second-row in Hull Kingston Rovers' 12–29 defeat by Hull F.C. in the 1984–85 Yorkshire Cup Final during the 1984–85 season at Boothferry Park, Kingston upon Hull, on Saturday 27 October 1984, appeared as a substitute (replacing Second-row Phil Hogan) in the 22–18 victory over Castleford in the 1985–86 Yorkshire Cup Final during the 1985–86 season at Headingley, Leeds, on Sunday 27 October 1985.

Kelly played at second-row in Hull Kingston Rovers' 8–11 defeat by Wigan in the 1985–86 John Player Special Trophy Final during the 1985–86 season at Elland Road, Leeds on Saturday 11 January 1986.

Kelly played at second-row in Hull Kingston Rovers' 14–15 defeat by Castleford in the 1985–86 Challenge Cup Final during the 1985–86 season at Wembley Stadium, London, on Saturday 3 May 1986, in front of a crowd of 82,134.

=== Wakefield Trinity ===
Kelly played at second-row and was captain in Wakefield Trinity's 8–11 defeat by Castleford in the 1990–91 Yorkshire Cup Final during the 1990–91 season at Elland Road, Leeds, on Sunday 23 September 1990.

During his time at Wakefield Trinity he scored fifteen 3-point tries and, fifteen 4-point tries.

=== International honours ===
Andy Kelly won a cap for England while at Wakefield Trinity in 1984 against Wales.

== Honours ==
England International - 1984

RL Championship Winner - 1983/84 & 1984/85

Yorkshire Cup Winner - 1985/86

JPS Trophy R-Up - 1985/86

Premiership Trophy R-Up - 1984/85

Yorkshire Cup R-Up - 1984/85

== Coaching career ==
He is the former head coach of the Ireland national rugby league team having coached them for over 11 years.

He is the former coach of Dewsbury Rams, Wakefield Trinity/Wakefield Trinity Wildcats, Featherstone Rovers, and Gateshead.

In December 2013, Kelly was appointed as Head of Youth Performance at Huddersfield Giants. He temporarily coached the senior team in 2016, following the departure of Paul Anderson. In 2019, he took on an additional role at the club as Rugby Manager.

Kelly was appointed as coach of the England Academy team in 2015. He was replaced by Lee Briers in 2017.

=== Huddersfield Giants ===
On 22 March 2026 it was reported that he had taken the role of interim head-coach for Huddersfield Giants in the Super League following the sacking of Luke Robinson

== Personal life ==
Andy Kelly is one of three brothers to have played professional Rugby league; Neil Kelly played for Wakefield Trinity, Dewsbury Rams, Hunslet and Featherstone Rovers and Richard Kelly played for Wakefield Trinity and Dewsbury Rams during the 1980s and 1990s.
