= Steve Zodiac =

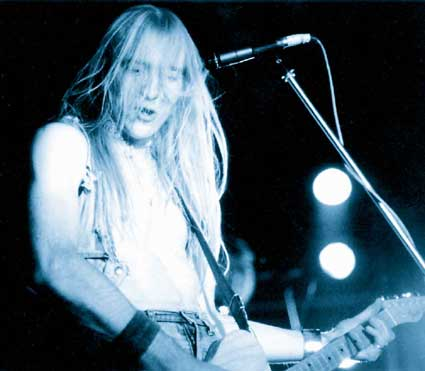
- Zodiac performing with Vardis

Background information
- Born: Stephen John Hepworth; Streethouse, West Yorkshire
- Genres: Heavy metal
- Occupations: Singer; songwriter
- Years active: 1973–present
- Member of: Vardis

Stephen John Hepworth, better known by his stage name Steve Zodiac is a guitarist and songwriter, who gained recognition in the early 1980s as frontman of new wave of British heavy metal band Vardis.

Born in Streethouse, Yorkshire, Zodiac rose to prominence after he formed Vardis in 1973, alongside bassist Tony Boulton and drummer Phil Medley He is credited as writer of heavy metal songs "If I Were King", "Lets Go", and "100mph"; and had a Fender Telecaster. He also experimented with bagpipes on the track "Police Patrol" from the 1981 album The World's Insane, worked with Jools Holland (Squeeze), Andy Bown (Status Quo & Pink Floyd), Ron Asprey, Terry Horbury (Dirty Tricks) and Judd Lander. Steve is thought to have taken his last name from either Sylvia and Gerry Anderson's astronaut in 1960s television show Fireball XL5, or his Selmer Zodiac 100-watt amplifier, which had to be used at full volume to get the distortion and sustain which was fundamental to his sound.

== See also ==
- Vardis
- New wave of British heavy metal
