= Vardis =

English rock band

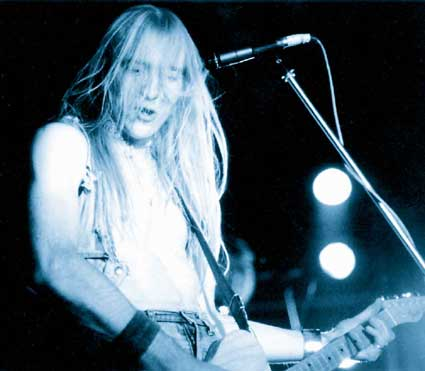
- Vardis front man Steve Zodiac

Background information
- Also known as: Quo Vardis (1973–1977)
- Genres: Hard rock, boogie rock, heavy metal
- Years active: 1973–1986, 2014–present
- Labels: SPV, Logo, various
- Members: Steve Zodiac; Joe Clancy; Roly Bailey
- Past members: Terry Horbury (d. 2015); Gary Pearson; Alan Selway; Martin Connolly; Steve Kingsley; Mick Taylor (d. 2003); Phil Medley; Paul Watkin; Andy Freeman; Andy Green; Steve Levitt; Tony Boulton (Mendes Prey)
- Website: Vardisrocks.com

Vardis are an English three-piece hard rock, boogie rock and heavy metal band from Wakefield, West Yorkshire, who enjoyed hits between 1978 and 1986, and reformed in 2014.

They formed a prominent part of the new wave of British heavy metal scene, then prevalent in the United Kingdom. They consisted of frontman Steve Zodiac (real name Stephen John Hepworth) on guitar and lead vocals Alan Selway on bass guitar and Gary Pearson on drums. Alan Selway was later replaced by Terry Horbury (previously of Dirty Tricks) on bass guitar.

== History ==
=== Formation ===
The band were originally formed in 1973 under the name 'Quo Vardis' (a misspelling of the Latin for 'quo vadis', or 'who goes there?'). This was later abbreviated to Vardis in 1977. Their first recordings were made at Holyground Studios in Cass Yard, Kirgate, Wakefield. The first ever track laid down on vinyl was titled "Jiving All Night Long" with the B-side titled "Stay with Me", both penned by Zodiac. This was followed up with a second record, both cover versions, those being "Roll Over Beethoven" (Chuck Berry) and "Don't Waste My Time" (Status Quo).

=== Career ===
Vardis quickly gained notoriety for their high energy live performances, the unique approach of incorporating elements of 1970s glam rock and heavy metal music and frontman Steve Zodiac's searing Fender Telecaster sound. Zodiac was reputable for playing Vardis concerts barefoot and bare chested, his look completed by long, naturally ice-blonde hair.

They took the unorthodox approach of comprising their debut album, 100MPH (1980), of entirely live recordings. This is largely considered to be their finest hour and gained the band a large following early on in their career. They were invited to play the Heavy Metal Holocaust music festival in August 1981 alongside Motörhead, Ozzy Osbourne and Triumph. Around 30,000 heavy metal fans were estimated to have attended with the PA reportedly reaching new heights of amplification at over 100,000 watts.

Their second album, released in April 1981 and called The World's Insane, featured a cover version of Hawkwind's "Silver Machine", and featured bagpipes played by Judd Lander, making it one of the few heavy metal albums of that time to ever feature bagpipes. The album also featured a guest appearances from Status Quo's Andy Bown on keyboards. In 1982, Steve Zodiac was voted in the top 15 rock guitarists by Sounds magazine readers.

=== Dissolution and reformation ===
Vardis dissolved in the mid-1980s amid lengthy legal disputes with former management. It reformed with the Zodiac/Horbury/Pearson lineup in March 2014, and performed at festivals in the UK and Germany until Gary Pearson's departure at the end of the year, with Hoplite Records reissuing a remastered edition of Vigilante (1986) on CD and digital download for the first time on 1 April. New drummer Joe Clancy was unveiled in January 2015, as Vardis announced plans to write and record new material. This new lineup released the EP 200 MPH on 18 July, the first new Vardis material in 29 years, to critical acclaim. In November 2015, Vardis penned a worldwide deal with SPV/Steamhammer, with the German label announcing the fifth Vardis album, Red Eye, had been scheduled for release in 2016. On 15 December that year, bassist Terry Horbury died suddenly after a short battle with cancer. Bassist Martin Connolly stepped in to fulfil live obligations in support of Red Eye the following year. Roly Bailey was unveiled as the new permanent bassist in September 2019.

== Discography ==
=== Live albums ===
- 100 M.P.H. (Logo, 1980) - UK No. 52
- 100 M.P.H. @ 100 Club (SPV/Steamhammer, 2021)

=== Studio albums ===
- The World's Insane (Logo, 1981)
- Quo Vardis (Logo, 1982)
- Vigilante (Raw Power, LP022, 1986)
- Red Eye (SPV/Steamhammer, 2016)

=== Compilation albums ===
- New Electric Warriors (Logo, 1980)
- Metal Power (Logo, 1981)
- The Lion's Share (Razor, 1983)
- NWOBHM (Phonogram, 1990)
- New Electric Warriors (British Steel, 1997)
- The World's Gone Mad (Essential, 2000)
- NWOBHM Rarities (British Steel, 2000)
- Metal (Sanctuary, 2001)
- Rock of Ages (Sanctuary, 2002)

=== Singles and EPs ===
- "Jiving All Night Long" (Holyground Enterprises, 1973)
- "Roll Over Beethoven" (Holyground Enterprises, 1973)
- "100 M.P.H. EP" (Redball, 1979)
- "If I Were King" (Castle, 1980)
- "Let's Go" (Logo, 1980) - UK No. 59
- "Too Many People" (Logo, 1980)
- "Silver Machine" (Logo, 1981)
- "All You'll Ever Need" (Logo, 1981)
- "Gary Glitter Part One" / "To Be With You" (Logo, 1982) - (double A-side single)
- "Standing in the Road" (Big Beat, 1984)
- "200 M.P.H. EP" (Hoplite Records, 2015)

== See also ==
- List of new wave of British heavy metal bands
