= Richard Kelly (rugby league) =

English rugby league footballer

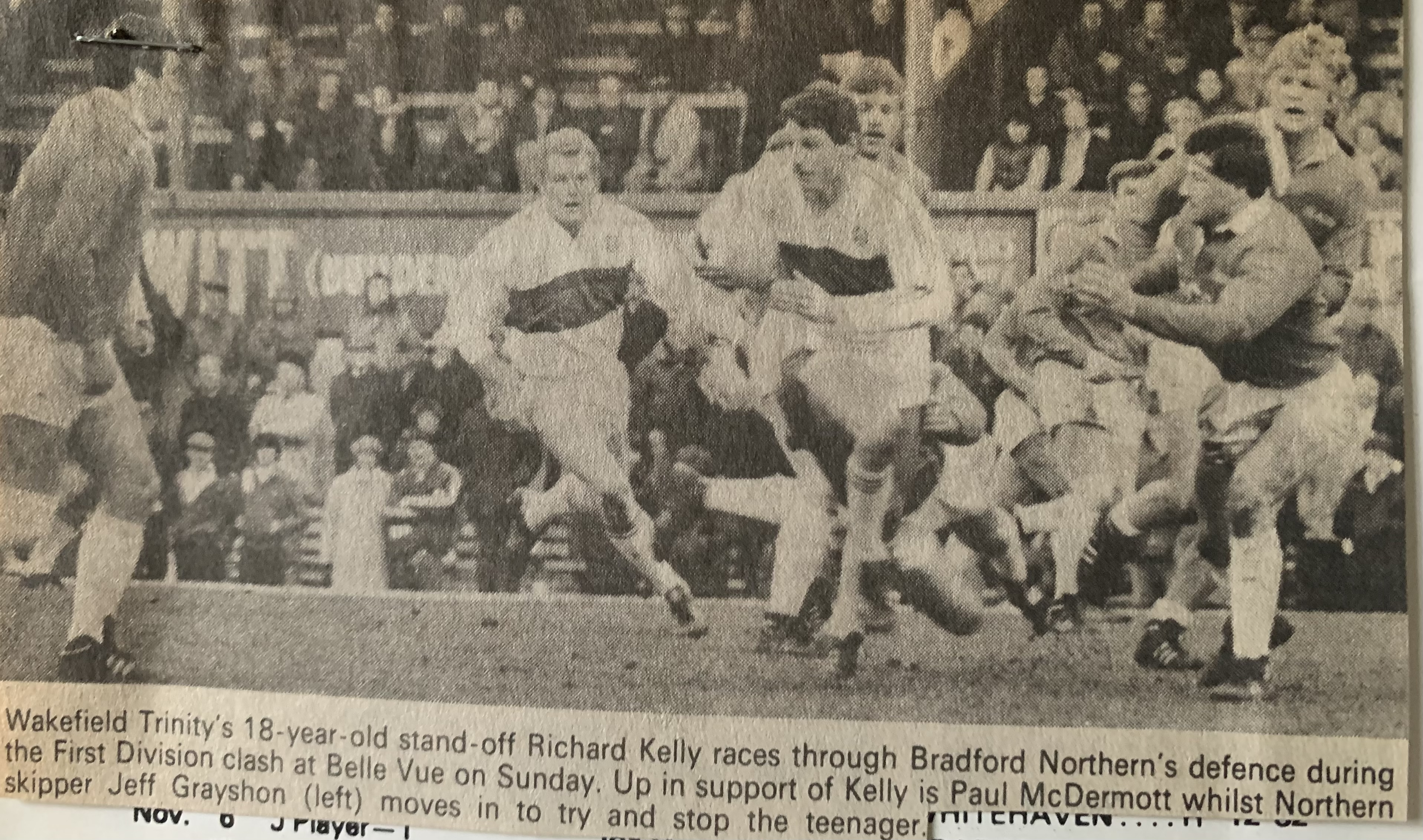
- Wakefield Trinity Stand Off Richard Kelly breaks Ellery Hanley’s tackle to split the Bradford defence

Personal information
- Born: 4 October 1965 (age 59); Wakefield, England

Playing information
- Position: Stand-off
Club
Years	Team	Pld	T	G	FG	P
1982–92	Wakefield Trinity	24	1
1993–95	Dewsbury Rams
	Total	24	1	0	0	0
- Relatives: Andy Kelly (brother); Neil Kelly (brother)

Richard Kelly, also known by the nickname "Kel", is an English former professional rugby league footballer who played for Wakefield Trinity [Heritage Number 925] from 1982 to 1992, and Dewsbury Rams in 1993 and 1994, as a fullback, centre, or stand-off.

Richard Kelly was born in Wakefield, West Riding of Yorkshire, England, he is the youngest of three brothers to have played professionally, with brothers Neil Kelly, Wakefield Trinity, Dewsbury Rams, Hunslet, Featherstone Rovers and Andrew "Andy" Kelly Wakefield Trinity, Hull Kingston Rovers, Illawarra Steelers (Australia).

== Playing career ==
=== Wakefield Trinity ===
1982-1992 A product of Wakefield Trinity's youth system and Colts 19s team, Richard Kelly made his professional début just three days after his 17th birthday, he went on to make a further 14 appearances that season scoring one try in an away victory over Whitehaven.

=== Dewsbury Rams ===
1993-1995
