= Mary Johnson Bailey Lincoln =

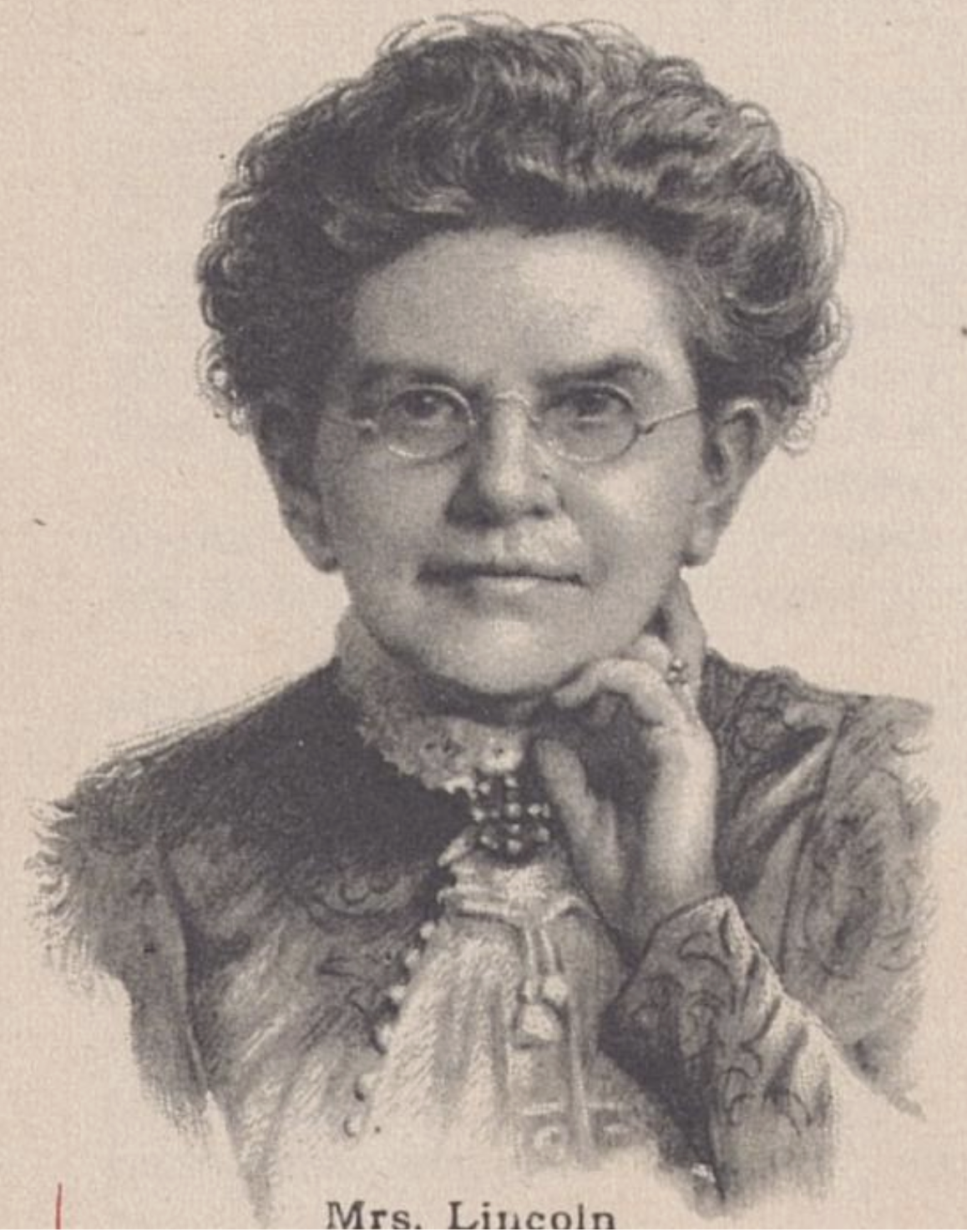
- Lincoln, c. 1912
- Born: July 8, 1844; South Attleboro, Massachusetts
- Died: December 2, 1921 (aged 77)
- Occupation: Educator

Signature
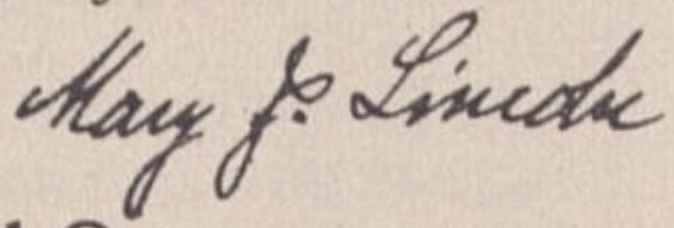

Mary Johnson Bailey Lincoln (July 8, 1844 – December 2, 1921) was an influential Boston cooking teacher and cookbook author. She used Mrs. D.A. Lincoln as her professional name during her husband's lifetime and in her published works; after his death, she used Mary J. Lincoln. Considered one of the pioneers of the Domestic Science movement in the United States, she was among the first to address the scientific and nutritional basis of food preparation.

== Early life ==
Born in South Attleboro, Massachusetts to Sarah Morgan Bailey and the Reverend John Milton Burnham Bailey, she contributed to the family income due to the death of her father when she was aged seven. In 1864 she graduated from the Wheaton Female Seminary, Norton, Mass., now known as Wheaton College.

In 1865, she married David A. Lincoln of Norton, Mass. and "happily settled down to life as a housewife" in Boston. During the late 1870s, David Lincoln's health began to fail and Mary entered domestic service to provide an income. (The Lincolns had no children.)

== Boston Cooking School ==
When the Boston Cooking School was founded in the spring of 1879, Mary Lincoln was invited to become its first teacher. As she later recalled, "I refused to consider the proposition, for while I knew that I could cook, I knew nothing about cooking schools. ... The matter was dropped and Miss [Joanna] Sweeney was engaged as a teacher."

In November, 1879 she was offered the opportunity to take lessons from Miss Sweeney and attend the public demonstration lectures by Maria Parloa, following which she would be engaged "to teach for six months at a salary of $75 per month. This was a most generous offer, and I felt that if others had so much confidence in me I certainly ought to be willing to try, and I consented to take the school a month on trial. ..." She continued at the school until 1885, eventually becoming its first principal. She inaugurated a wide variety of special courses and lectures ranging from free courses for immigrant girls in Boston's North End to special instruction in "sick-room cookery" for nurses from area hospitals.

== Cookbooks and writing ==
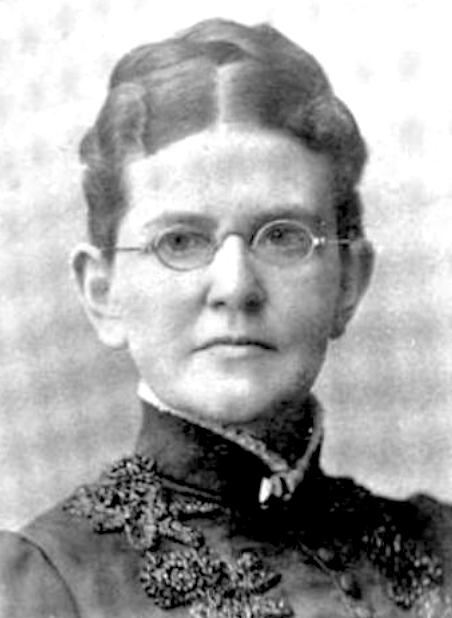
Lincoln, from an 1894 publication

During her years at The Boston Cooking School, she researched and wrote Mrs. Lincoln's Boston Cook Book: What to Do and What Not to Do in Cooking, published by the Boston firm of Roberts Brothers in 1884. She later observed, "This was done primarily to meet the need of a textbook for our pupils and save the copying of recipes ..."

It was one of the first American cook books to provide scientific information about nutrition and the chemistry of cooking. It also help set a pattern for the rational organization of cookbooks, and was among the first in America to provide recipes formulated with consistent measurements. It should be seen as the fore-runner to the world-famous Boston Cooking-School Cook Book by Fannie Merritt Farmer, Mrs. Lincoln's most prominent student who eventually succeeded her as principal of the Boston Cooking School.

In addition, Mrs. Lincoln's Boston Cook Book included extensive advice for those who wished to operate a school of cooking in a chapter entitled "An Outline of Study for Teachers." Mrs. Lincoln touted her book as “not only a collection of recipes,” but a book “which shall also embody enough of physiology, and of the chemistry and philosophy of food, to make every principle intelligible to a child and interesting to the mature mind.”

In 1885, following the death of her sister, Mrs. Lincoln resigned from the school. Her interest in the education of young women continued, however. She subsequently taught at the Lasell Seminary (now Lasell College) in Auburndale, Massachusetts until 1889. During this time, she wrote her second book, The Peerless Cook Book, first published in 1886. At the request of the Boston Public Schools, she prepared the Boston School Kitchen Textbook: Lessons in Cooking for the Use of Classes in Public and Industrial Schools, published in 1887. Together with Mrs. Lincoln's Boston Cook Book, this served as the basis of cooking instruction across America and in Great Britain.

David A. Lincoln died in 1894. In the same year, Mary Lincoln served as a member of the "Advisory Committee" of The New England Kitchen Magazine which later became American Kitchen Magazine. An active member of the New England Woman's Press Association she was the culinary editor and wrote the syndicated column “Day to Day” for the magazine.

In addition, she wrote for other periodicals, published books, and devised a large number of advertising pamphlets for food and cooking equipment companies. Due to her status and fame, she provided endorsements for a range of products including her own company, Mrs. Lincoln's Baking Powder Company of Boston.

She remained active in the culinary and journalism fields until her death from a cerebral hemorrhage in 1921.

== Works ==
- Lincoln, Mrs. D.A. Mrs. Lincoln's Boston Cook Book: What to Do and What Not to Do in Cooking. (Boston, MA: Roberts Brothers, 1884). Reprinted (with an incorrect and misleading title) as: Boston Cooking School Cook Book. With a new introduction by Janice (Jan) Bluestine Longone. (Mineola, NY: Dover Publications, Inc., 1996). This is a reprint of the 1887 edition, "the text of which is identical to the original." (p.ii).
- Lincoln, Mrs. D.A. The Peerless Cook Book (Boston, Mass.: Little, Brown & Co., 1886). "New and enlarged edition with recipes for the chafing dish," (Boston, Mass.: Little, Brown & Co., 1901).
- Lincoln, Mrs. D.A. Boston School Kitchen Textbook: Lessons in Cooking for the Use of Classes in Public and Industrial Schools. (Boston, Mass.: Roberts Brothers, 1887).
- Lincoln, Mrs. D.A. Carving and Serving (Boston, Mass.: Roberts Brothers, 1887).
- Lincoln, Mrs. D.A. "Frozen Dainties: Fifty Choice Receipts for Ice-creams, Frozen Puddings, Frozen Fruits, Frozen Beverages, Sherbets and Water Ices." (Nashua, N.H.: The White Mountain Freezer Co., 1889). Reprinted multiple times.
- Lincoln, Mrs. D.A. What to Have for Luncheon (New York, N.Y.: Dodge Publishing Company, 1904).
  - Also published as A Book of Good Luncheons for My Friend, Dodge Publishing Company, New York City, (1916)
- Lincoln, Mrs. D.A. Pure Food Cook Book: A Collection of Tested and Economical Recipes. (Chicago, Ill.: N.K. Fairbank Co., 1907).
