= Maria Parloa =

First celebrity cook in the U.S.

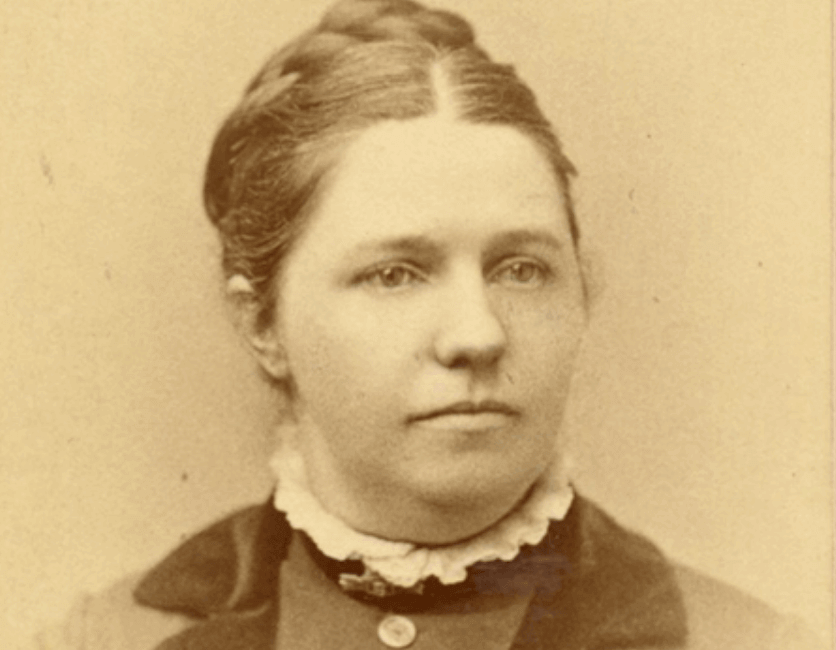
- Born: September 25, 1843; Massachusetts. United States.
- Died: August 21, 1909 (aged 65); Bethel, Connecticut
- Resting place: Forest Hills Cemetery
- Education: Maine Central Institute
- Occupation: Author
- Writing career
- Subjects: Cooking and housekeeping
- Notable works: The Appledore Cookbook, Camp Cookery: How to Live in Camp, First Principles of Household Management and Cookery: A Text-Book for Schools and Families

Maria Parloa (September 25, 1843 – August 21, 1909) was an American author of books on cooking and housekeeping, the founder of two cooking schools, a lecturer on food topics, and an early figure in the "domestic science" (later "home economics") movement. A culinary pioneer, she was arguably America's first celebrity cook, considered "one of the innovative superstars of her field".

== Early life ==
Maria Parloa was born in Massachusetts on September 25, 1843. Both her mother and father had been born in New York state. Little is known about her early life; she is said to have been orphaned at a young age. Nor is it known where she learned to cook, although in the Preface to her first book, The Appledore Cook Book, published in 1872, she asserts that she has "had years of experience as a cook in private families and hotels." The latter included the Rockingham House, Portsmouth, New Hampshire; Pavilion Hotel, Wolfeboro, New Hampshire; McMillan House, North Conway, New Hampshire; and the Appledore Hotel on Appledore Island, Maine, one of the Isles of Shoals.

In 1871, Parloa entered the Normal School of the Maine Central Institute, Pittsfield, Maine, completing her teacher training course two years later.

== Career ==
Following graduation, Maria Parloa accepted a position as a teacher in "a small country school" in Mandarin, Florida (a small town now part of the City of Jacksonville) where she remained for five winters. During this time, she gave a talk on cookery to raise money to buy "a small cabinet organ" for the local Sunday school. This led to an invitation to give a lecture on "Cooking and Digestion" in New London, Connecticut, during the summer of 1876. It was so well received, that in May, 1877, she gave a successful series of four talks in one of the lecture rooms at Boston's Tremont Temple. As she later recollected, "The interest seemed to warrant my undertaking the work, and I decided to open a school in the fall, 1877, which I did on Tremont Street. The interest was very great, and all the time I had my school in Boston I had more than I possibly could do ..."

Miss Parloa's School of Cooking opened in October, 1877, at 174 Tremont Street, Boston. (This should not be confused with the Boston Cooking School, founded two years later.)

In 1878, she gave lectures on cookery at nearby Lasell Seminary for Young Women, Auburndale (Newton), Massachusetts; also at Miss A.C. Morgan's Boarding and Day School for Young Ladies, Portsmouth, New Hampshire. In the same year, her second book, Camp Cookery: How to Live in Camp, was published in Boston.

During the summer of 1878, Parloa traveled to Europe where she studied English and French culinary practice at first hand. Her observations at the South Kensington and the Board Schools in London were the inspiration for her next book: First Principles of Household Management and Cookery: A Text-Book for Schools and Families, published in 1879. That same year, the Women's Education Association of Boston provided a subvention of $100 for the establishment of The Boston Cooking School. Its first teacher was Joanna Sweeney who taught the classes in basic cookery; Maria Parloa was engaged to give regular lectures on more sophisticated topics.

During this time, she prepared the text for Miss Parloa's New Cook Book: A Guide to Marketing and Cooking, published in 1880.

Although Miss Parloa's own school and her lectures at the Boston Cooking School were both extremely popular, they were not financially rewarding. In 1882, she closed her school, left Boston, and moved to New York City. In November, 1882, she opened Miss Parloa's School of Cooking at 222 East Seventeenth Street. Here, in addition to the regular courses of instruction during the day, Miss Parloa also offered free instruction to "immigrant girls" in the evening.

In 1887, "having made a considerable fortune," she stopped teaching in New York and moved back to Boston, where she "purchased a comfortable home in Roxbury." During the same year, her next cookbook, Miss Parloa's Kitchen Companion: A Guide for All Who Would Be Good Housekeepers, was published in Boston.

In her later years, Miss Parloa capitalized on her celebrity by endorsing several food products: she may have been the first to do so. One Hundred Ways to Use Leibig Company's Extract of Beef: A Guide for American Housewives appeared in 1893. Though the booklet was "printed in the United States," it was published in London. A second London edition bears the copyright date 1897.

She returned to Europe in 1894 for a three-year study of "the domestic systems of France, England, and Germany." Her plan was to spend a year living with a French family, a second with a German family, and a final year "living in suburban England." "The results of these studies will be made known by Miss Parloa in a series of magazine articles." Maria Parloa moved back to New York City in 1898 where she lived until 1903. The United States Census for 1900 shows that her household included a "servant" of Irish birth named Sarah Hourigan.

In 1899, she attended a meeting in Lake Placid, New York, "to begin the work of professionalizing home economics." She was also present in 1908 when the American Home Economics Association was formed.

In 1903, she moved to Bethel, Connecticut, where she lived until her death, sharing her home with two orphan girls. She organized the Village Improvement Society, and participated in community landscaping. She died on August 21, 1909, following surgery in Bethel, Connecticut, and her remains where interred at the Forest Hills Cemetery. At the time, she was making plans for her third trip to Europe.

== Works ==
- Parloa, Maria. The Appledore Cook Book. Boston: Graves and Ellis, 1872. Second Edition (Andrew F. Graves), 1877. New Edition, 1880.
  - pbk reprint of 1880 edition. Bedford, Massachusetts: Applewood Books. 2008. ISBN 978-1-4290-9008-7.
- Parloa, Maria. Camp Cookery: How to Live in Camp. Boston: Estes and Lauriat, 1878.
- Parloa, Maria. First Principles of Household Management and Cookery: A Text-Book for Schools and Families. Boston: Houghton, Osgood, and Company, 1879. New and enlarged edition, 1882.
- Parloa, Maria. Miss Parloa's New Cook Book: A Guide to Marketing and Cooking. Boston: Estes and Lauriat, 1881. Revised edition, 1908.
  - pbk reprint of 1908 edition. Bedford, Massachusetts: Applewood Books. 2008. ISBN 978-1-4290-1274-4.
- Parloa, Maria. Practical Cookery with Demonstrations. New York Tribune Extra No. 85. New York: The Tribune, 1884.
- Parloa, Maria. Miss Parloa's Kitchen Companion: A Guide for All Who Would Be Good Housekeepers. Boston: Estes and Lauriat, 1887.
- Parloa, Maria. Miss Parloa’s Young Housekeeper: Designed Especially to Aid Beginners.Boston: Dana Estes and Co., 1893. Second edition, 1894. Third edition, 1895.
- Parloa, Maria. Home Economics: A Guide to Household Management, Including the Proper Treatment of the Materials Entering into the Construction and Furnishing of the House. New York: Century Co., 1898.
- Parloa, Maria. Chocolate And Cocoa Recipes by Miss Parloa, and Home Made Candy Recipes by Mrs. Janet McKenzie Hill. Dorchester, MA: W. Baker and Co., Ltd., 1909.
- Parloa, Maria. Canned Fruit, Preserves and Jellies. Household Methods of Preparation. Prepared under the supervision of Experiment Stations, U.S. Department of Agriculture. Chicago-Akron-New York: The Saalfield Publishing Co., 1917.

== Sources ==
- Elizabeth Driver, Culinary Landmarks (University of Toronto Press, 2008), p. 116.
