= Neil Kelly =

Professional Rugby League & Union coach & former rugby league footballer

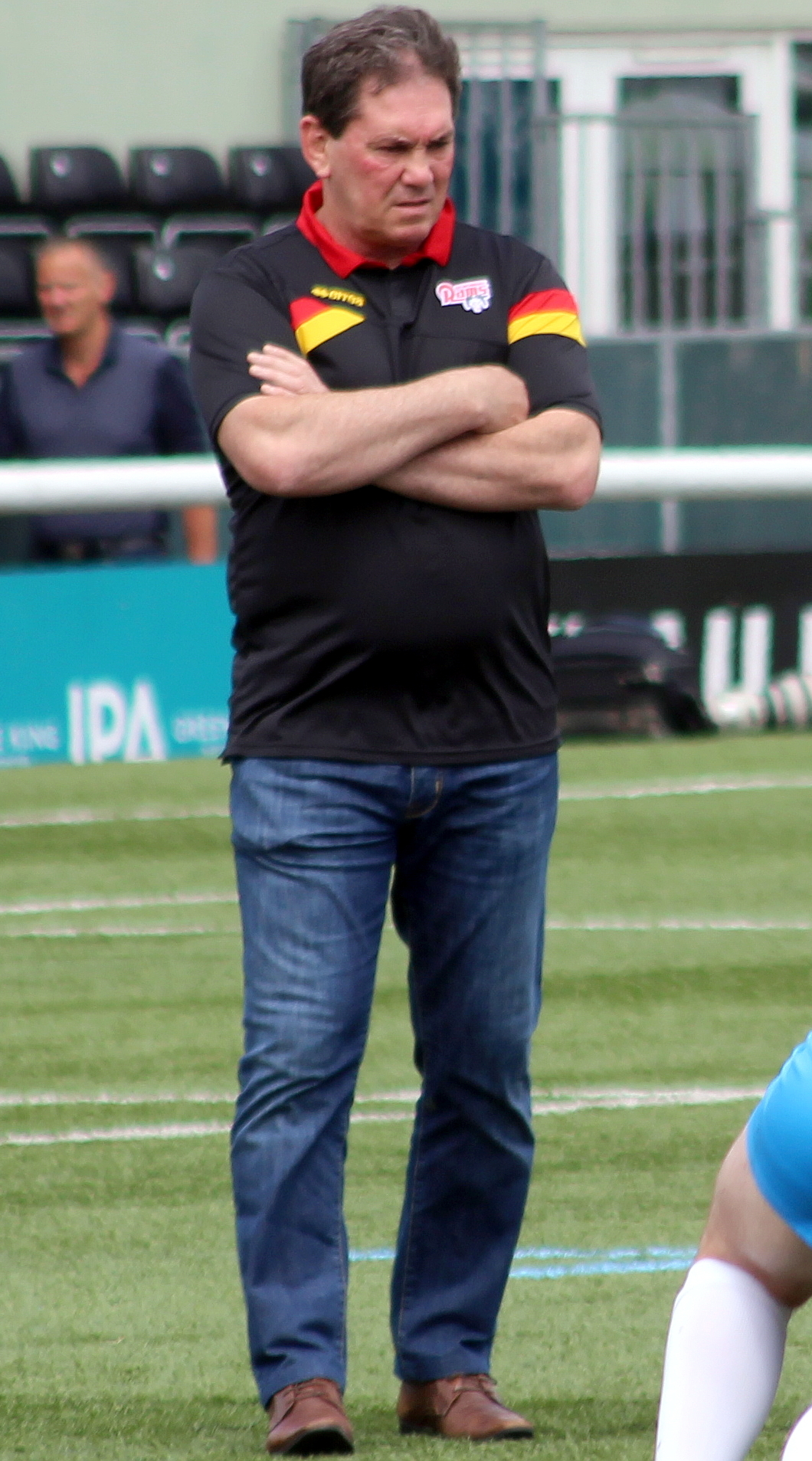

Personal information
- Born: 10 May 1962 (age 63) Wakefield, West Riding of Yorkshire, England

Playing information
- Position: Loose forward, Hooker
Club
Years	Team	Pld	T	G	FG	P
1984–86	Dewsbury Rams
1985–86	Featherstone Rovers
1986–87	Wakefield Trinity
≥1987–≤89	Hunslet Hawks
1989–91	Dewsbury Rams
	Total	0	0	0	0	0

Coaching information

Rugby league
Club
Years	Team	Gms	W	D	L	W%
1995–01	Dewsbury Rams
2001–04	Widnes Vikings	97	50	2	45	52
2008–10	Leigh Centurions
2017–18	Dewsbury Rams
2022	Cornwall RLFC	11	1	0	10	9
	Total	108	51	2	55	47
Representative
Years	Team	Gms	W	D	L	W%
2001–03	Wales	5	1	0	4	20

Rugby union
Club
Years	Team	Gms	W	D	L	W%
2004–08	Ulster Rugby (defence)
2010	Doncaster R.F.C. (assistant)
2019–21	Houston SaberCats (defense)
	Total	0	0	0	0
Representative
Years	Team	Gms	W	D	L	W%
2011	Namibia (assistant)
- Relatives: Andy Kelly (brother); Richard Kelly (brother)

Neil Kelly (born 10 May 1962) is a former English rugby league coach and former professional player who was the head coach of Dewsbury Rams.

He played club level rugby league for Dewsbury Rams (two spells), Featherstone Rovers, Wakefield Trinity and Hunslet Hawks as a hooker or loose forward, and coached representative level rugby league (RL) for Wales, and at club level for Dewsbury Rams, Widnes Vikings, Leigh Centurions, and coached representative level rugby union (RU) for Namibia (assistant), and at club level for Ulster Rugby (defence), and Doncaster Knights (assistant).

== Coaching career ==
=== Leigh Centurions ===
On his return to England and Rugby League Neil spent two years as the head coach and then director of football at Leigh Centurions Rugby League Club, competing in the Co-Operative Rugby League Championship.

=== Ulster ===
Kelly spent two and a half years working as the defence coach for Ulster Rugby Union Club.

=== Widnes Vikings ===
Whilst at Widnes, the club won the Grand Final.

=== Dewsbury Rams ===
No promotion for Dewsbury after Grand Final win.

=== Cornwall RLFC ===
On 8 Dec 2021 it was announced that Neil had been appointed as head coach of new club Cornwall RLFC.

On 24 October 2022 it was announced that Neil's assistant Mike Abbott had taken over as head coach by mutual consent.

== Genealogical information ==
Neil Kelly is one of three brothers to play professional Rugby League, Andrew "Andy" Kelly who played for Wakefield Trinity, Hull Kingston Rovers and Illawarra Steelers (Australia), and Richard Kelly who played for Wakefield Trinity and Dewsbury.
