= Women's Education Association =

Women's Education Association (WEA) was an American organization focused on better education of women. Founded in 1872, it did a large and varied work. Among other good things, it established training schools for nurses, diet kitchens, and cooking schools, including the Boston Cooking School (1878), the Harvard Examination, the Women's Laboratory, and a summer home for working girls.

== History ==
The Women's Education Association was founded by Lucretia Crocker, in Boston, Massachusetts in 1872. Its object is to promote the better education of women, both by gathering information about improved methods of study and teaching and by affording opportunity to its new members to initiate new educational plans. It has about 120 members, with standing committees for executive work. It meets at the house of one of its members once a month, and at each meeting these committees are expected to report any important facts which have come under their notice, and the progress of the work committed to their charge. During each month a special meeting is aleo beld, when members and friends are present and an address is given by some person specially conversant with the subject upon which he speaks.

It has thus been the means of organizing a Training School for Nurses, at present in successful operation in connection with the Massachusetts General Hospital. It bas helped to establish Diet Kitchens for supplying suitable food to the sick poor, and they are now a valuable part of the benevolent work of the city. By its parlor meetings it has stimulated the interest long felt in the introduction of sewing into the girls' schools, which is now taught with marked success. In the same way public attention was called to the necessity of establishing a separate prison for women.

The aid of the Association was also given to the formation of a class of women for the study of advanced chemistry at the laboratory of the Girls' High School. This class was found to meet so great a want that a chemical laboratory has been fitted up in connection with the Massachusetts Institute of Technology, and furnished by money collected by the association with apparatus and instruments, such as microscopes, spectroscopes, &c. From time to time pecuniary aid has also been given to young women seeking an advanced education.

But the chief work of the Association —the first undertaken and still carried on under its charge- is a plan of examinations known as the Harvard Examinations for Women. These originated in a desire to raise the standard of education in the schools for girls, and are held under the personal supervision of members of the Association. Examination papers, prepared by Professors at Harvard University, are provided by the Association, and those women who successfully pass this examination receive a certificate from the university stating the fact. Branch societies have been established in New York City, Philadelphia, and Cincinnati for the same purpose.
