= Fannie Farmer =

American chef (1857–1915)

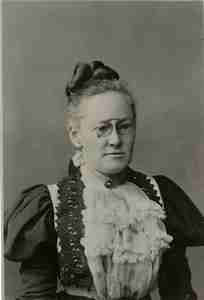
- c.1900
- Born: Fannie Merritt Farmer; March 23, 1857; Boston, Massachusetts, U.S.
- Died: January 15, 1915 (aged 57)
- Occupations: Chef, cookbook writer
- Known for: Boston Cooking-School Cook Book

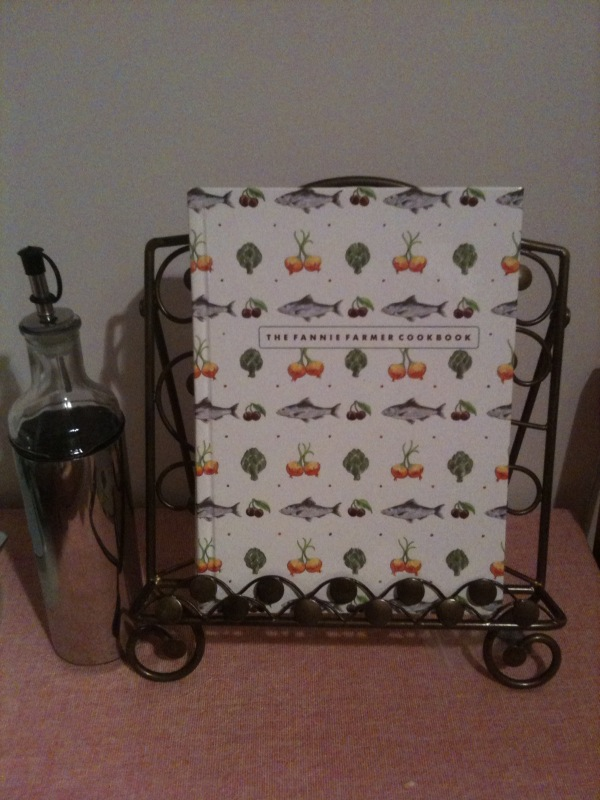
Fannie Farmer Cook Book, the 1996 hardcover edition

Fannie Merritt Farmer (23 March 1857 – 16 January 1915) was an American culinary expert whose Boston Cooking-School Cook Book became a widely used culinary text.

== Education ==
Fannie Farmer was born on 23 March 1857 in Boston, Massachusetts, United States, to Mary Watson Merritt Farmer and John Franklin Farmer, an editor and printer. The family was Unitarian. The oldest of four daughters in a family that highly valued education, she was expected to go to college, but suffered a paralytic stroke at the age of 16 while attending Medford High School. For the next several years she was unable to walk and remained in her parents' care at home. During this time Farmer took up cooking, eventually developing a reputation for the quality of the meals her mother's boarding house served.

Farmer developed a substantial limp that never left her. At the age of 30 she enrolled in the Boston Cooking School at the suggestion of Mrs. Charles Shaw. Farmer studied there during the height of the domestic science movement, learning its most critical elements, including nutrition and diet for the well, convalescent cookery, techniques of cleaning and sanitation, chemical analysis of food, techniques of cooking and baking, and household management. Farmer was considered one of the school's top students, graduating in 1889 and staying on as assistant to the director. In 1891, she took the position of school principal.

== Cookbook fame ==
Fannie published her best-known work, The Boston Cooking-School Cook Book, in 1896. A follow-up to an earlier version called Mrs. Lincoln's Boston Cook Book, published by Mary J. Lincoln in 1884, the book under Farmer's direction eventually contained 1,850 recipes, from milk toast to Zigaras à la Russe. Farmer also included essays on housekeeping, cleaning, canning and drying fruits and vegetables, and nutritional information.

The book's publisher (Little, Brown & Company) did not predict good sales and limited the first edition to 3,000 copies, published at the author's expense. However, the book was so popular in America, so thorough, and so comprehensive that cooks would refer to later editions simply as the Fannie Farmer Cookbook, and it is still available in print over 100 years later.

Farmer provided scientific explanations of the chemical processes that occur in food during cooking, and helped to standardize the system of measurements used in cooking in the USA.

Farmer left the School in 1902 and created Miss Farmer's School of Cookery. She began by teaching gentlewomen and housewives the rudiments of plain and fancy cooking, but her interests eventually led her to develop a complete work of diet and nutrition for the ill, titled Food and Cookery for the Sick and Convalescent, which contained thirty pages on diabetes. Farmer was invited to lecture at Harvard Medical School and began teaching convalescent diet and nutrition to doctors and nurses. She felt so strongly about the significance of proper food for the sick that she believed she would be remembered chiefly by her work in that field, as opposed to her work in household and fancy cookery. Farmer understood perhaps better than anyone else at the time the value of appearance, taste, and presentation of sickroom food to ill and wasted people with poor appetites; she ranked these qualities over cost and nutritional value in importance.

== Later life ==
During the last seven years of her life, Farmer used a wheelchair. Despite her immobility she continued to write, invent recipes, and lecture, giving her last one ten days before her death. The Boston Evening Transcript published her lectures, which were picked up by newspapers nationwide. Farmer also lectured to nurses and dietitians, and taught a course on dietary preparation at Harvard Medical School.

Farmer died in 1915 at age 57 of complications due to a stroke, and was interred in Mount Auburn Cemetery in Cambridge, Massachusetts. One hundred and three years later, The New York Times published a belated obituary for her.

== Works ==
- Farmer, Fannie Merritt (1896). Boston Cooking-School Cook Book. Boston, MA: Little, Brown, and Company. A complete list of editions may be found at Boston Cooking-School Cook Book.
- Farmer, Fannie Merritt (1898). Chafing Dish Possibilities. Boston, MA: Little, Brown, and Company.
- Farmer, Fannie Merritt (1904). Food and Cookery for the Sick and Convalescent. Boston, MA: Little, Brown & Co.
- Farmer, Fannie Merritt (1905). What to Have for Dinner: Containing Menus with Recipes for their Preparation. New York, NY: Dodge Publishing Company.
- Farmer, Fannie Merritt (1911). Catering for Special Occasions, with Menus and Recipes. Philadelphia, PA: D. McKay.
- Farmer, Fannie Merritt (1912). A New Book of Cookery: Eight-hundred and Sixty Recipes Covering the Whole Range of Cookery. Boston, MA: Little, Brown, and Company.
- Farmer, Fannie Merritt, ed. (1913). The Priscilla Cook Book for Everyday Housekeepers. Boston, MA: The Priscilla Publishing Company.
- Farmer, Fannie Merritt (1914). A Book of Good Dinners for My Friend; or "What to Have for Dinner". New York, NY: Dodge Publishing Company. [Republication of What to Have for Dinner: Containing Menus with Recipes for their Preparation (1905).]
