= The Boston Cooking-School Cook Book =

General reference cookbook

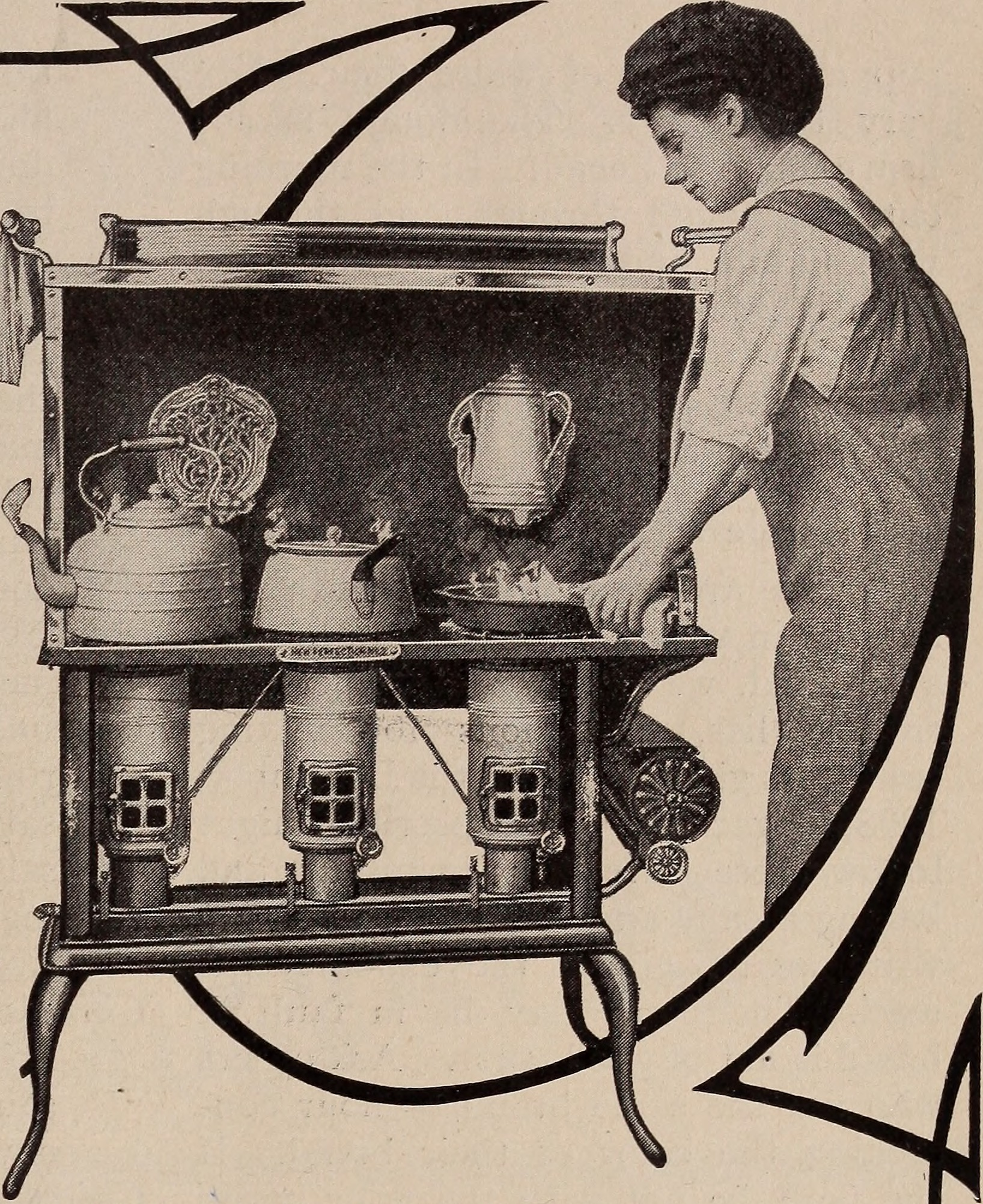
The Boston Cooking School magazine of culinary science and domestic economics

The Boston Cooking-School Cook Book (1896) by American culinary expert Fannie Farmer is a 19th-century general reference cookbook which is still available both in reprint and in updated form. It was particularly notable for a more rigorous approach to recipe writing than had been common up to that point.

In the preface Farmer states:

It is my wish that it may not only be looked upon as a compilation of tried and tested recipes, but that it may awaken an interest through its condensed scientific knowledge which will lead to deeper thought and broader study of what to eat.

Farmer's 1896 compilation became the best-selling cookbook of the era.

In 2007, that period of American culinary history was recreated in an elaborate dinner using the Victorian cooking methods outlined in this book. The extensive preparations and the ultimate results were described in a book entitled Fannie's Last Supper by Christopher Kimball, and an American public television program of the same name was broadcast in 2010.

== Publication history ==
When Little, Brown & Company was preparing the first edition of Fannie Farmer's cookbook, they were not confident it would sell well. As such, the first edition, released in 1896, had a limited run of only 3,000 copies. It proved an immediate success.

Facsimiles of the original book are still in print. Heavily revised successor books, later retitled The Fannie Farmer Cookbook, have also been published, the most recent being the thirteenth edition by author Marion Cunningham, originally issued in 1990 and then reissued in 1996 for the 100th anniversary of the original book.

The twelfth and thirteenth editions were published by Knopf Publishing Group.

- 1st edition, 1896. 567 pp.
- 2nd edition, 1906. 648 pp.
- First Revised edition, 1912. 648 pp.
- 3rd edition, 1918. 656 pp.
- 4th edition, 1923. 808 pp.
- 5th edition, 1930. 831 pp.
- 6th edition, 1936. 838 pp.
- 7th edition, 1941. 824 pp.
- 8th edition, 1946. 879 pp. (Fannie Farmer's Boston Cooking School Cook Book)
- 9th edition, 1951. 878 pp. (The New Fannie Farmer Boston Cooking-School Cookbook on cover)
- 10th edition, 1959. 596 pp. (The All New Fannie Farmer Boston Cooking-School Cookbook)
- 11th edition, 1965. 624 pp. (first to be titled The Fannie Farmer Cookbook)
- 12th edition, 1979. 811 pp. ("Revised by Marion Cunningham with Jeri Laber")
- 13th edition, 1990. 874 pp. ("By Marion Cunningham")
