= Hebden Royd =

Town and Civil Parish in West Yorkshire, England

Coordinates: 53.742°N 2.009°W

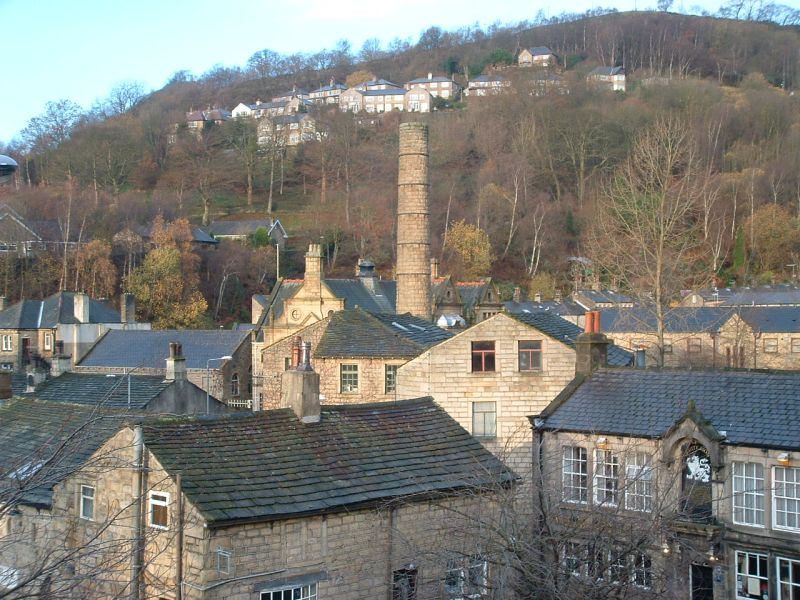
- Over the rooftops of Hebden Bridge

- Hebden Royd parish within Calderdale
- Population: 9,558 (2011 census)
- OS grid reference: SD993273
  - London: 170 mi (270 km) SSE
- Metropolitan borough: Calderdale
- Metropolitan county: West Yorkshire
- Region: Yorkshire and the Humber
- Country: England
- Sovereign state: United Kingdom
- Post town: HEBDEN BRIDGE
- Postcode district: HX7
- Dialling code: 01422
- Police: West Yorkshire
- Fire: West Yorkshire
- Ambulance: Yorkshire
- UK Parliament: Calder Valley

Hebden Royd is a civil parish in the Metropolitan Borough of Calderdale in West Yorkshire, England. According to the 2001 census it had a population of 9,092, rising to 9,558 at the 2011 census. It includes market town of Hebden Bridge and the villages of Mytholmroyd and Cragg Vale. The parish was an urban district before 1974, created in 1937 by the merger of Hebden Bridge and Mytholmroyd urban districts.

== History ==
The Town Council has 18 seats over 6 wards - Birchcliffe, Cragg Vale, Caldene, Fairfield, West End and White Lee. As of September, 11 are Labour-held, 2 are Lib Dem, 2 are progressive independents and 3 are independent

Hebden Bridge Town Hall and adjoining fire station is a Grade II listed building, built in 1898. The building was transferred from Calderdale Metropolitan Borough Council to Hebden Bridge Community Association on a 40-year lease (now extended to 125 years) on 1 April 2010, along with funds for basic maintenance work. Substantial volunteer time was put into renovation works and fundraising to secure the building's future. The £3.7 million raised was used to create a small enterprise centre and new community facilities on land adjacent. More than 450 local people signed up as "Friends of the Town Hall" and became able to vote for the trustees.

Hebden Royd lies close to the Pennine Way and Hardcastle Crags and is popular for outdoor pursuits such as walking, climbing and cycling. It lies on the Rochdale Canal – a through route across the Pennines.

The area's location in the valley causes problems with flooding, particularly between Hebden Water and the cinema on New Road, Brearley Fields in Mytholmroyd, and further up the valley at Callis Bridge by the sewage works and the old Aquaspersions factory. Flooding at Callis Bridge is so frequent that the level of the River Calder has been lowered and special perforated kerbstones fitted so that water can drain back into the river. Brearley, on a flood plain, contains the playing fields for Calder High School and local football, rugby league and cricket teams. Hebden Royd suffered two devastating floods in the summer of 2012, and again at Christmas 2015; Todmorden, Mytholmroyd, Sowerby Bridge and York were also affected, with houses, pubs, shops and community centres suffering damage to property. The extent of the Hebden Royd flooding was shown in drone videos of the flooded areas, the most severe flooding occurring in Hebden Bridge town centre. Hebden Royd suffered the worst flooding ever seen in the area on Boxing Day of 2015, the River Calder reached the highest ever recorded levels, flooding buildings never before flooded such as Burnley Road Academy in Mytholmroyd.

The parish is on the route of the Calderdale Way, a circular walk of about 50 miles (80 km) around the hills and valleys of Calderdale.

== Transport ==
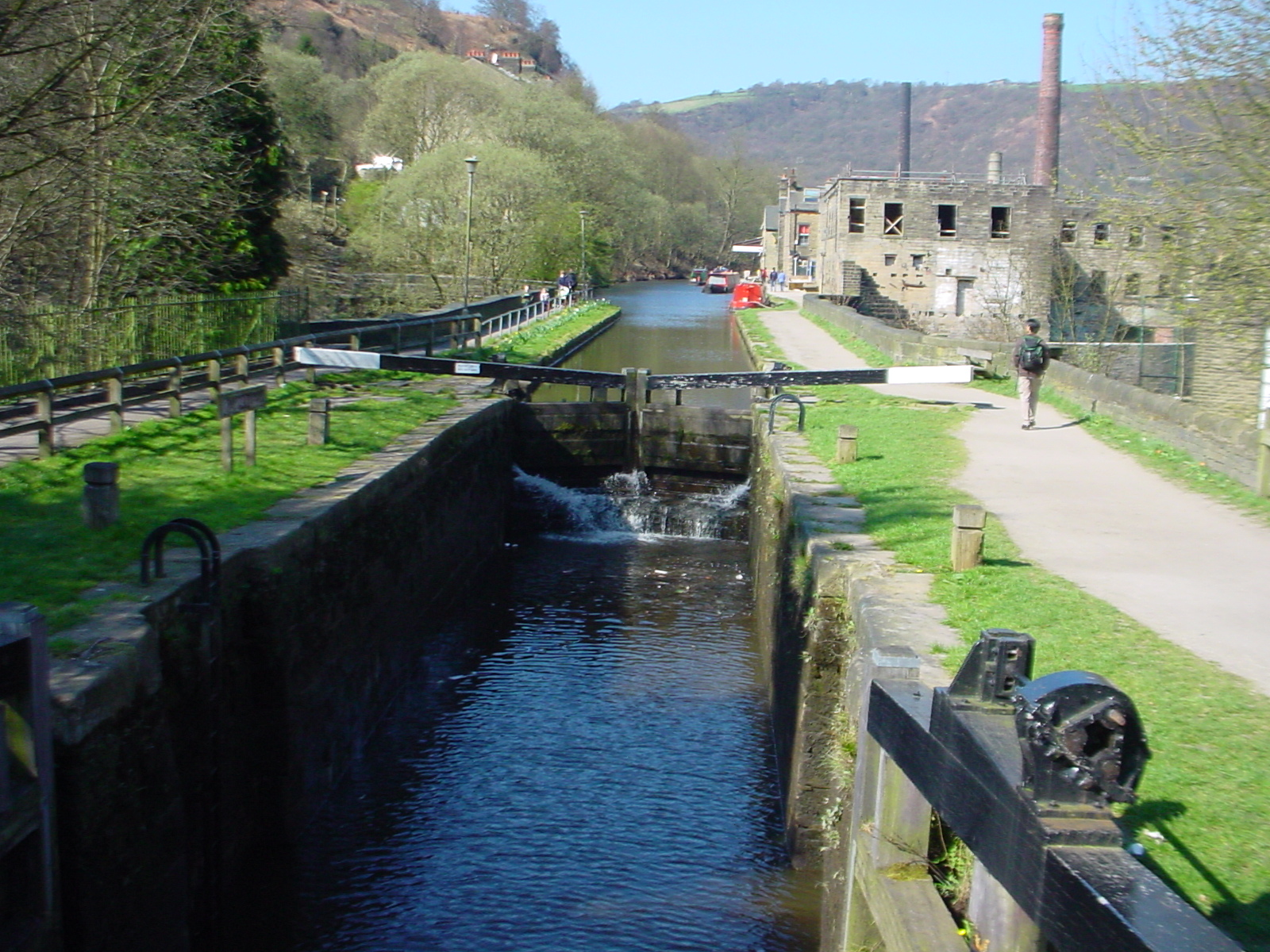
The Rochdale Canal at Hebden Bridge

Hebden Bridge railway station lies on the Caldervale Line between Manchester Victoria and Leeds. It is served by frequent Northern services to towns and cities in Lancashire, Greater Manchester, as well as West and North Yorkshire including Leeds, Blackpool North, York, Manchester Victoria and Todmorden. There are also some infrequent services to Dewsbury via Brighouse. The station is still in the original Lancashire & Yorkshire Railway colours, decorated with hanging baskets, original signage and luggage trolleys. Mytholmroyd railway station also serves most of the services into and from Hebden Bridge railway station, with the exception of Blackpool-York services, which only stop at Hebden Bridge. Mytholmroyd also serves disabled passengers from Hebden Royd, with no disabled facilities at Hebden Bridge railway station.

Bus services in the parish are operated by three companies. First West Yorkshire operate the 12-minute frequency 592 service between Halifax and Todmorden, with services extending to Burnley (592) and Rochdale (590) in evenings and at weekends. Keighley Bus Company connect Hebden Bridge with Haworth, Oxenhope and Keighley with its hourly BrontëBus service. The "Hebden Bridger" is a local bus network operated by TLC Travel, that operates across seven services to local towns and hilltop villages. TLC Travel also operate the hourly 900 and 901 services between Hebden Bridge and Huddersfield town centre.

== See also ==
- Listed buildings in Hebden Royd
