= Blake Dean Railway =

Former narrow gauge railway in West Yorkshire

Coordinates: 53.778018°N 2.059144°W

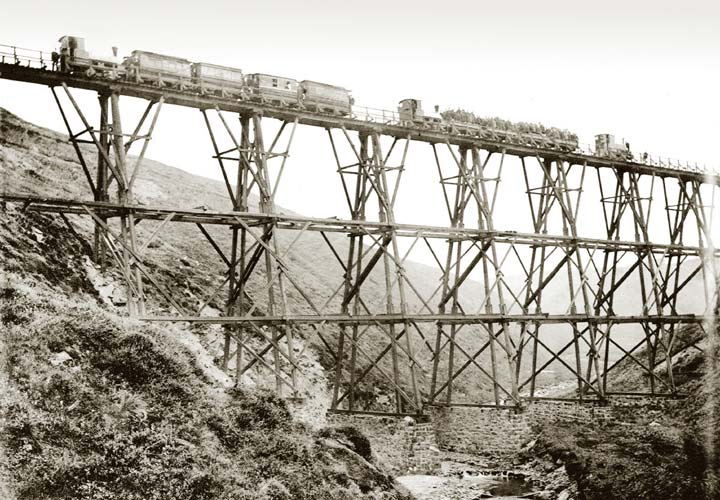
- Static loading test of the trestle bridge

Overview
- Status: Defunct
- Locale: West Yorkshire
- Termini: Hardcastle Crags; Walshaw Dean Reservoirs

Service
- Type: Freight

History
- Opened: 1900
- Closed: 1912

Technical
- Line length: 8.9 km (5.5 mi)
- Number of tracks: 1
- Track gauge: 3 ft (914 mm)

The Blake Dean Railway was an approximately 8.9 km (5.5 mi) long, 3 ft (914 mm) gauge narrow gauge railway on the edge of Hardcastle Crags Valley in West Yorkshire. It went from Heptonstall to the dam construction sites of the Walshaw Dean Reservoirs.

== Route ==
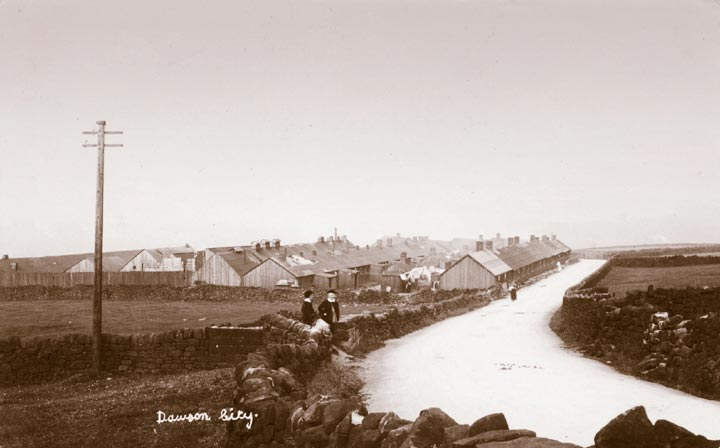
Dawson City near Whitehall Nook in Heptonstall

The rail track started in Dawson City, a shanty town near Whitehall Nook in Heptonstall, along a hill side over several wooden bridges, passing the Widdop Gate and crossing the valley on a trestle bridge to the construction sites of the lower, middle and upper dam of the Walshaw Dean Reservoirs.

The 180 m (590 ft) long and 32 m (105 ft) high trestle bridge consisted of pitch pine. Enoch Tempest contracted the architect William Henry Cockcroft and the local carpenter George H. Greenwood to erect the bridge. It was completed on 24 May 1901.

On 22 July 1906 the bridge caught fire probably by the sparks from the funnels of one of the steam locomotives, but this was quickly noted and extinguished. The damage was only £30, and the bridge was used again one day later.

The bridge was sold by auction on 22 May 1912 and disassembled in the same year for recycling the wood. Now, only remains of the foundations are visible.

== Rolling stock ==
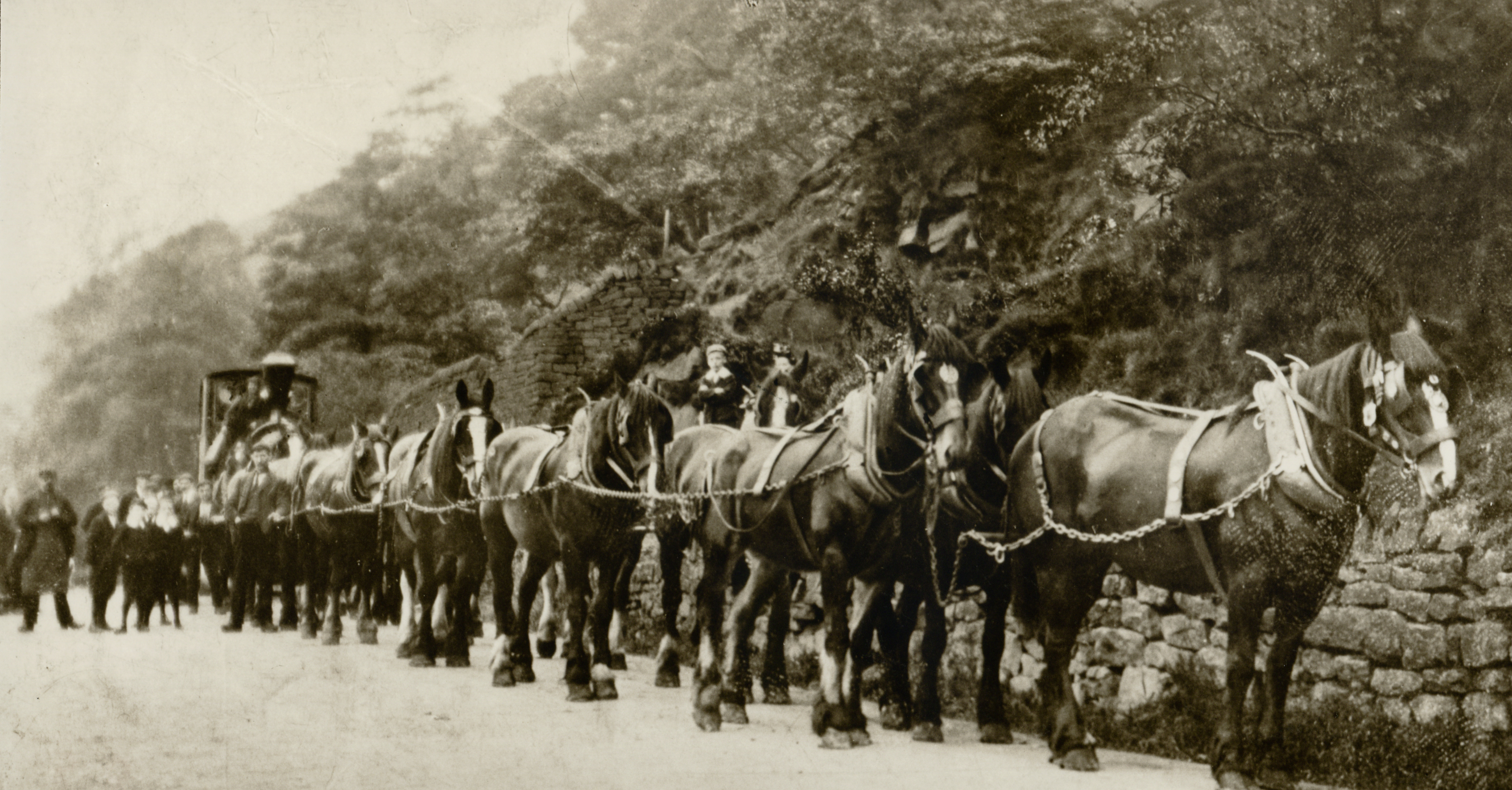
Eleven in hand harnessed horse team transporting a locomotive from Hebden Bridge to Heptonstall

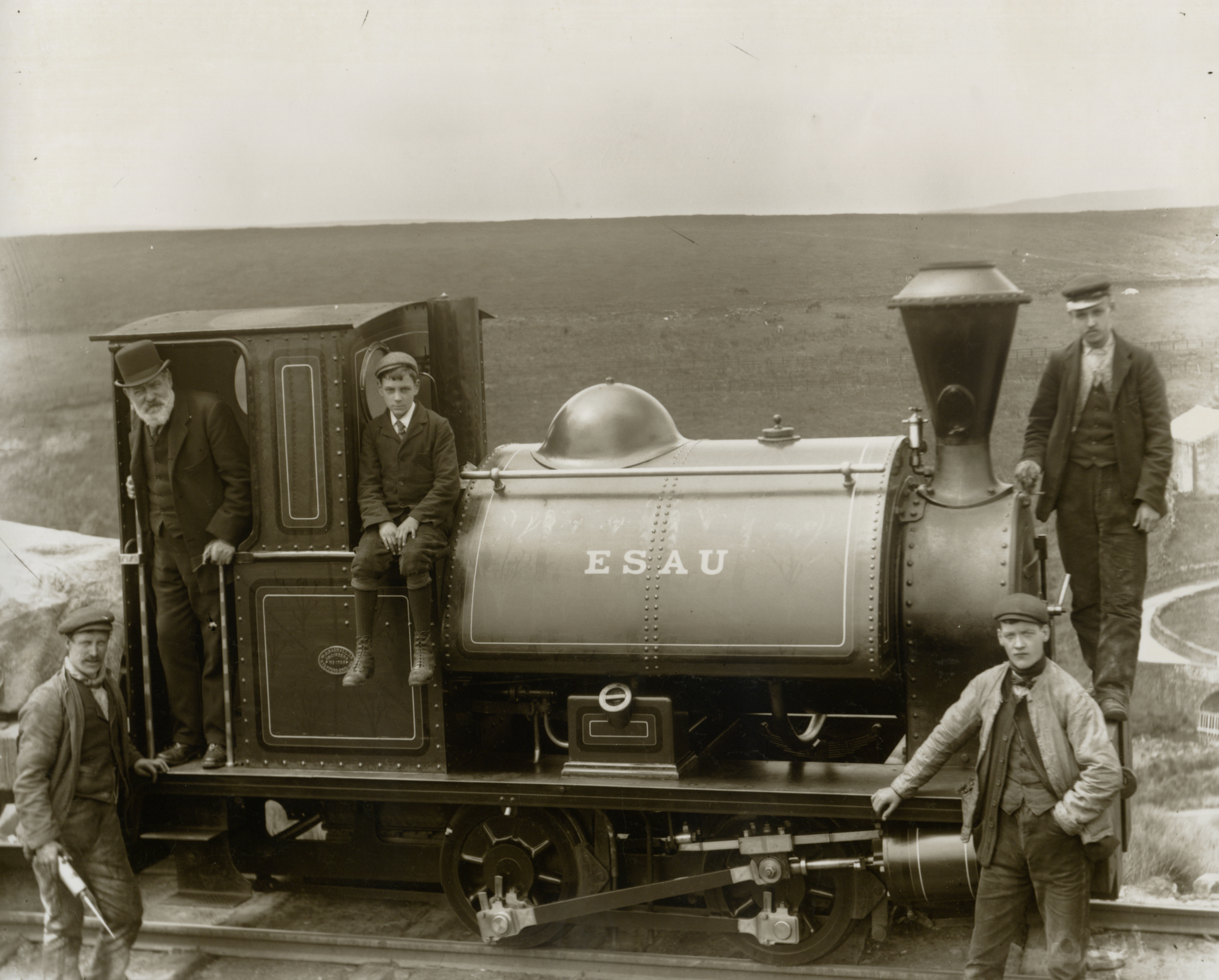
The steam engine 'Esau' driven by Enoch Tempest on the footplate and his son George on the coal box

There were fifteen steam locomotives in use, amongst them 'Esau' and 'Baldersdale'. The family owned haulage company Hopwood dragged all but one locomotives by horse teams from Hebden Bridge up to Heptonstall over the steep road, which winds itself over 91 m (299 ft) in height difference via two hairpins. The transport was normally conducted on Saturday afternoons, when as many as sixteen horses were available.

A fatal accident occurred on 5 September 1905, when the locomotive 'Baldersdale' derailed underneath the portal crane of the middle dam. When the locomotive tipped onto its side, driver John Leech pushed fireman James Taylor to safety but slipped himself, so that he was scalded by the steam emerging from the boiler. He died a few days later from his injuries.

The navvies used surplus tram cars from the horse-drawn tram in Liverpool for getting to and from the construction sites. They had still their blue and green livery and showed indicated the destinations "Lime Street" and "Fazakerley".

== Literature ==
- Corinne McDonald and Ann Kilbey: City in the Hills: Dawson City and the Building of the Walshaw Dean Reservoirs. Hebden Bridge Local History Society. 1 December 2012. ISBN 978-0953721757.
