= Lynn Breeze =

British illustrator and author

- Education: Kingston College of Art
- Occupations: Illustrator and author
- Children: 2
- Writing career
- Genre: Children's board books
- Notable works: Pickle and the Ball, Pickle and the Blanket, Pickle and the Blocks, Pickle and the Box, This Little Baby Goes Out, This Little Baby at Playtime
- Website: Lynn Breeze Art

Lynn Breeze is a British illustrator and author who specialises in books for babies and toddlers. She has illustrated more than 100 books, and has also written many stories. Breeze is well known for her Pickle series of board books, which introduce infants to household objects, as well as the This Little Baby series. Her books have been translated into various European languages, and have been distributed internationally.

== Education and early career ==
Breeze studied at the Kingston College of Art, and was influenced by the 1966 Aubrey Beardsley exhibition at the V&A Museum, as well as the work of Alan Cracknell. She started her career working at an advertising agency in Ipswich, and later worked as the art editor for East Anglia Magazine, where she also did all the illustrations. As a freelance artist, she designed greeting cards and album sleeves, in addition to illustrating books. Other projects included producing artwork for the BBC Jackanory series.

== Books ==
The first book Breeze did all the illustrations for was Lost Baggage in 1982. She wrote and illustrated All Day Long and All Night Long, published by Hodder & Stoughton, and achieved success with the This Little Baby series of board books. These included This Little Baby Goes Out and This Little Baby's Playtime, which she wrote and illustrated, and This Little Baby's Morning, This Little Baby's Bedtime, and others published by Orchard Books and Little, Brown, written by Ann Morris and illustrated by Breeze.

The Pickle series written and illustrated by Lynn Breeze include books such as Pickle and the Ball, Pickle and the Blanket, Pickle and the Blocks, and Pickle and the Box, published by Kingfisher. Pickle is the name of a bald, bright-eyed baby who is curious about the world, and finds new uses for household objects.

Other board books by Breeze have included My First Tooth, My New Potty, My Day Out, and My New Baby (Orchard Books), which she illustrated using pencil, watercolour, and gouache. The rhyming text can be sung to tunes such as "Baa Baa Black Sheep", "Rock-a-bye Baby", and "Once I caught a fish alive".

She has illustrated books for many children's authors, working with Joyce Dunbar on Tomatoes and Potatoes (Ginn); Tony Bradman on Billy and the Baby (HarperCollins); Sue Nicholls on Bobby Shaftoe Clap Your Hands: Musical Fun with New Songs from Old Favourites (A & C Black); and Donna Bryant on the One Day series (Hodder & Stoughton).

== Critical reception ==
=== US reviews ===
In 1993, School Library Journal called This Little Baby Goes Out and This Little Baby's Playtime, which were both written and illustrated by Breeze, "pleasant fare for toddlers", adding, "Their large formats and vividly colored subjects make them useful for story times." Meanwhile, Entertainment Weekly said that This Little Baby series offered babies "tender pictures of a familiar world", but argued that while "Breeze's drawings are upbeat...sometimes her smiling characters look not just happy but tipsy."

In 1999, the Pittsburgh Post-Gazette said in a widely syndicated review that the Pickle series of board books were "the very definition of simple, but just right for the youngest set." School Library Journal suggested that parents would find inspiration for games to play at home with their children.

=== UK reviews ===
In 1991, Child Education named This Little Baby Goes Out to its annual "Best Books" list, saying that the This Little Baby series was "well balanced and full of colour, depicting events within the experience of all children."

In 1995, TES magazine called Our Baby by Tony Bradman and Lynn Breeze a "lifeline" for parents who have toddlers and babies at the same time. The book makes toddlers aware of the things that they can do, which babies and even parents cannot, helping them deal with having a baby in the family "through a sense of fun, presenting illustrations with bold shapes that a toddler can easily recognise; good, strong colours and a tremendous sense of pattern", with curving text woven into the images.

In 1999, a review of This Little Baby's Morning in The Sunday Telegraph highlighted "Lynn Breeze's warm, happy pictures", in addition to Ann Morris's rhyming text.

== Personal life ==
Breeze has two daughters, who were an inspiration for her work when they were very young. She has lived in many parts of the UK, and eventually settled in Hebden Bridge, where she has been part of the Upper Calder Valley artists' community.
