= Tony Bradman =

English writer (born 1954)

Tony Bradman (born 22 January 1954) is an English writer of children's books and short speculative fiction best known for the Dilly the Dinosaur book series. He is the author of more than 50 books for young people published by multiple houses including Alfred A. Knopf, Methuen Publishing, Puffin Books, and HarperCollins

Bradman was born in Balham, London. He earned a M.A. degree from Queens' College, Cambridge, and worked as a music writer and as a children's book reviewer for Parents magazine before beginning to write children's literature in 1984. His Dilly the Dinosaur series has sold over 2 million copies worldwide.

Bradman was elected a Fellow of the Royal Society of Literature in 2024.

Bradman and his family live in Beckenham, Kent.

== Bibliography ==
=== Standalone ===
- The Bad Babies' Counting Book, illustrated by Debbie van der Beek, 1985.
- John Lennon, illustrated by Karen Heywood, 1985.
- One Nil, illustrated by Gary Wing, 1985; illustrated by Jon Riley, 1987.
- Let's Pretend, illustrated by Susan Hellard, 1985.
- The Bad Babies' Book of Colors, illustrated by Debbie van der Beek, 1986.
- See You Later, Alligator, illustrated by Colin Hawkins, 1986.
- At the Park, illustrated by Susan Hellard, 1986.
- Hide and Seek, illustrated by Susan Hellard, 1986.
- Play Time, illustrated by Susan Hellard, 1986.
- Through My Window, illustrated by Eileen Browne, 1986.
- The Lonely Little Mole (based on a story by Paule Alen), illustrated by Myriam Deru, 1986.
- Night-Time, illustrated by Caroline Holden, 1986.
- Will You Read Me a Story?, 1986.
- Baby's Best Book, illustrated by Lisa Kopper, 1987.
- The Baby's Bumper Book, illustrated by Lisa Kopper, 1987.
- The Bad Babies' Book of Months, illustrated by Debbie van der Beek, 1987.
- Smile, Please!, illustrated by Jean Baylis, 1987.
- I Need a Book!, 1987.
- The Little Cakemaker and the Greedy Magician (based on a story by Paule Alen), illustrated by Myriam Deru, 1987.
- Look out, He's behind You!, illustrated by Margaret Chamberlain, 1988.
- Wait and See, illustrated by Eileen Browne, 1988.
- Not like That, like This!, illustrated by Joanna Burroughes, 1988.
- Bedtime, illustrated by Lisa Kopper, 1988.
- The Cuddle, illustrated by Lisa Kopper, 1988.
- Our Cat, illustrated by Lisa Kopper, 1988.
- All Together Now! (poetry), illustrated by J. Park, 1989.
- Who's Afraid of the Big Bad Wolf?, illustrated by Margaret Chamberlain, 1989.
- Bub, 1989.
- Gary and the Magic Cat, 1989, published as The Magic Cat, 1992.
- Tracey's Wish, 1989.
- The Sandal: A Story, illustrated by Philippe Dupasquier, 1989.
- This Little Baby, illustrated by Jenny Williams, 1990.
- Michael, illustrated by Tony Ross, 1990.
- Let's Go, 1990.
- Gerbil Crazy, 1990.
- Miranda the Magnificent, 1990.
- In a Minute, illustrated by Eileen Browne, 1990.
- The Ugly Duckling, 1990.
- The Gingerbread Man, 1991.
- Goldilocks and the Three Bears, 1991.
- The Little Red Hen, 1991.
- Five Minutes More!, 1991.
- Morning, 1991.
- That's Not a Fish!, illustrated by Susie Jenkins-Pearce, 1991.
- Tommy Niner and the Planet of Danger, 1991.
- Billy and the Baby, illustrated by Jan Lewis, 1992; illustrated by Lynn Breeze, 1997.
- It Came from Outer Space, illustrated by Carol Wright, 1992.
- Has Anyone Seen Jack?, illustrated by Margaret Chamberlain, 1992.
- Frankie Makes a Friend, illustrated by S. Holleyman, 1992.
- My Family, illustrated by Madeleine Baker, 1992.
- My Little Baby Brother, illustrated by Madeleine Baker, 1992.
- That's Not My Cat!, illustrated by Jean Baylis, 1992.
- Wally's New Face, illustrated by Jean Baylis, 1992.
- Winnie's New Broom, illustrated by Jean Baylis, 1992.
- A Bad Week for the Three Bears, illustrated by Jenny Williams, 1993.
- The Invaders, illustrated by Mark Burgess, 1993.
- Tommy Niner and the Mystery Spaceship, illustrated by Martin Chatterton, 1994.
- Night Night, Ben!, 1994.
- Two Minute Puppy Tales, illustrated by Kim Blundell, 1994.
- The Ghost Teacher, illustrated by Paul Kavanagh, 1996.
- A Goodnight Kind of Feeling, illustrated by Clive Scruton, 1998.
- Daddy's Lullaby, illustrated by Jason Cockcroft, 2002.
- The Magnificent Mummies, illustrated by Martin Chatterton, 2002.
- Midnight in Memphis (sequel to The Magnificent Mummies), illustrated by Martin Chatterton and Ann Chatterton, 2002.
- Under Pressure ("Hawks" series), 2002.
- Bad Boys ("Hawks" series), 2003.
- Skin Deep (short stories), 2004.
- Give Me Shelter: Stories About Children Who Seek Asylum (editor), 2007.

=== The Greatest Adventures in the World ===
- Jason and the Voyage to the Edge of the World, co-written and illustrated by Tony Ross, 2004. (ISBN 1843624729)
- Arthur and the King's Sword, co-written and illustrated by Tony Ross, 2004. (ISBN 1843624753)
- Aladdin and the Fabulous Genie, co-written and illustrated by Tony Ross, 2004. (ISBN 184362477X)
- Ali Baba and the Stolen Treasure, co-written and illustrated by Tony Ross, 2004. (ISBN 1843624737)
- Robin Hood and the Silver Arrow, co-written and illustrated by Tony Ross, 2004. (ISBN 1843624745)
- William Tell and the Apple for Freedom, co-written and illustrated by Tony Ross, 2004. (ISBN 1843624761)

== Dilly the Dinosaur series ==
The Dilly the Dinosaur series was illustrated by Susan Hellard.

- Dilly the Dinosaur 1986.
- Dilly Visits the Dentist, 1986, published in U.S. as Dilly Goes to the Dentist, 1986.
- Dilly Tells the Truth, 1986.
- Dilly and the Horror Film, published in U.S. as Dilly and the Horror Movie, 1987.

== Dilly and the Tiger, 1988. ==
- Dilly, 1988.
- Dilly and the Ghost, 1989.
- Dilly Dinosaur, Superstar, 1989.
- Dilly Speaks Up, 1990.
- Dilly Goes on Holiday, 1990.
- Dilly the Angel, 1990.
- Dilly and His Swamp Lizard, 1991.
- Dilly and the Big Kids, 1991.
- Dilly's Birthday Party, 1991.
- Dilly Goes to School, 1992.
- Dilly and the Pirates, 1993.
- Dilly—The Worst Day Ever, 1993.
- Dilly Goes Swamp Wallowing, 1994.
- Dilly, Dinosaur Detective, 1994.

=== Daisy Tales series ===
The Daisy Tales series was illustrated by Priscilla Lamont.

- Daisy and the Babysitter, 1986.
- Daisy and the Crying Baby, 1986.
- Daisy and the Washing Machine, 1986.
- Daisy Goes Swimming, 1986.
- Daisy Feels Ill, 1988.
- Daisy Goes to Playgroup, 1988.

=== The Bluebeards series ===
The Bluebeards series was illustrated by Rowan Barnes Murphy.

- Adventure on Skull Island, 1988.
- Mystery at Musket Bay, 1989.
- Contest at Cutlass Cove, 1990.
- Search for the Saucy Sally, 1990.
- Peril at the Pirate School, 1990.
- Revenge at Ryan's Reef, 1991.

=== Sam, the Girl Detective series ===
- Sam, the Girl Detective, 1989.
- The Cash Box Caper, 1990.
- The Case of the Missing Mummy, 1990.
- The Secret of the Seventh Candle, 1992.
- The Great Rock 'n' Roll Ransom, 1994.
