= Walshaw Dean Reservoirs =

Reservoirs in West Yorkshire, England

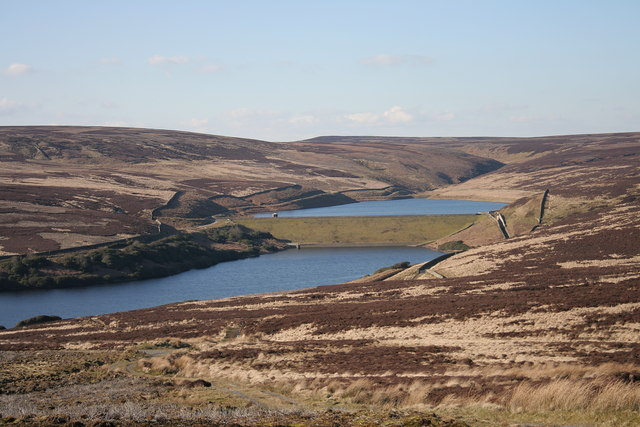
- The Upper and Middle reservoirs in March 2009

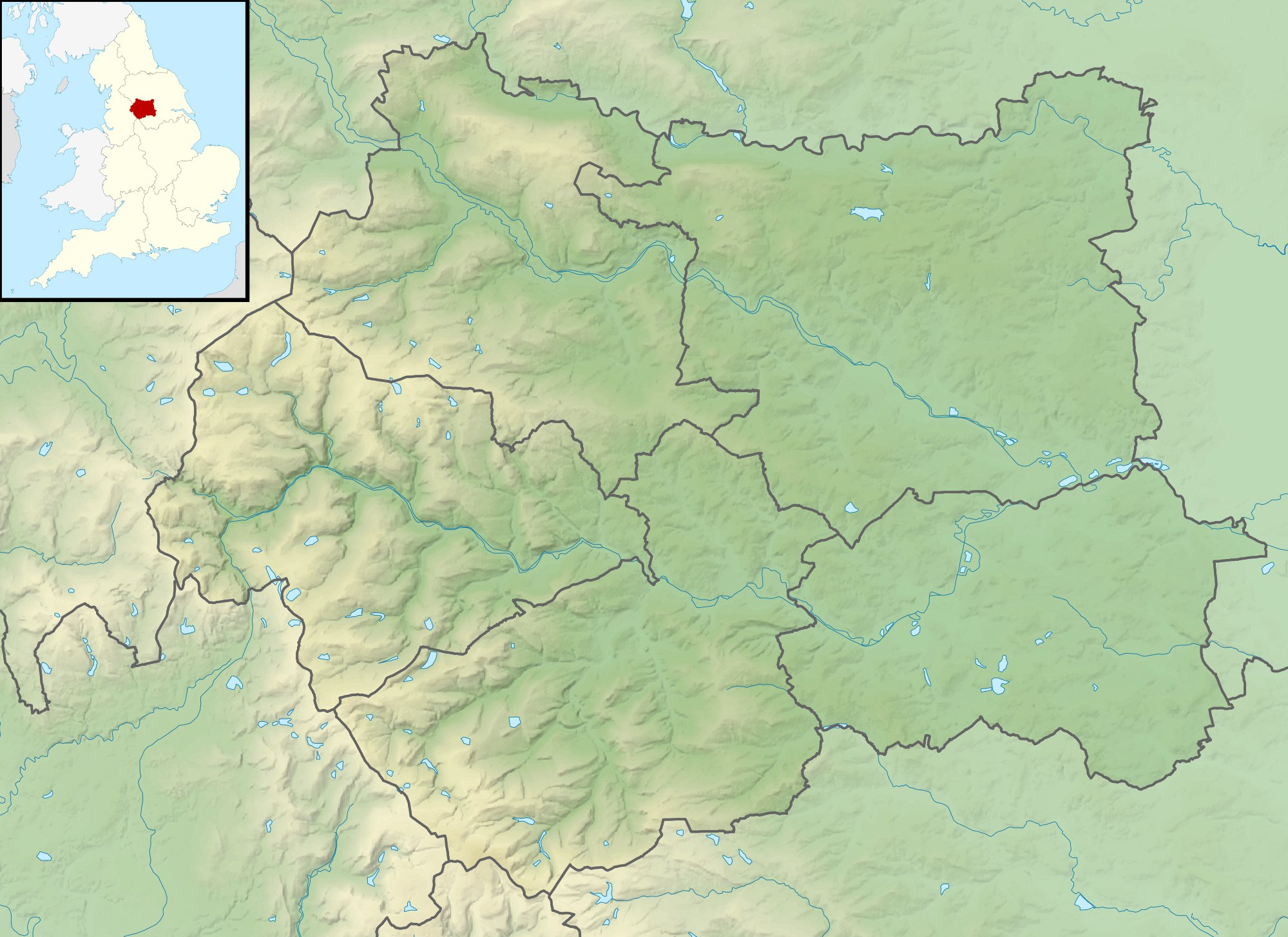
- Location within West Yorkshire
- Interactive map of Walshaw Dean Reservoirs
- Location: Hebden Bridge, West Yorkshire
- Coordinates: 53.7994°N 2.0514°W
- Type: Reservoir
- Primary outflows: Calder Valley
- Basin countries: United Kingdom
- Managing agency: Yorkshire Water
- Built: 1901
- First flooded: 1907
- Surface area: 11.293 km^{2} (4.360 sq mi)
- Average depth: 7.495 m (24.59 ft)
- Surface elevation: 305 m (1,001 ft)
- References: Defra

Walshaw Dean Reservoirs are three reservoirs above Hebden Bridge, West Yorkshire, England. They are between Hebden Bridge and Top Withins, a ruined farmhouse near Haworth, the reputed inspiration for "Wuthering Heights" in the novel of the same name by Emily Brontë.

The reservoirs' catchments are dominated by peatland habitats. The reservoirs drain into the Calder Valley.

On 19 May 1989 Walshaw Dean Lodge entered the UK Weather Records with the highest 120-minute total rainfall at 193 mm (7.6 in); however, the Met Office expresses 'reservations' about this record.

== History ==
To cope with the growing population of Halifax, construction of the reservoirs was put out to tender by Halifax Corporation. The winning bid, for £170,766 (1900) (equivalent to £23.74 million or US$30.34 million in 2024), was submitted by Enoch Tempest.

To house the navvies working on construction a temporary shanty town named Dawson City was built, with a narrow-gauge railway, Blake Dean Railway, to transport navvies and construction materials to the sites of the reservoirs.

== Access ==
The reservoirs are on the Pennine Way.
