= Churchill School (Harare) =

Location
- 17.8284°S 31.0824°E

Information
- Type: Public, boarding and day, high School
- Motto: Bulldog for ever
- Established: 1950
- Headmaster: Mr. Aquanos Mazhunga
- Staff: 83
- Enrollment: 1,487
- Colours: Purple, grey & platinum
- Mascot: Bulldog
- Alumni: Winstonians
- Website: www.churchill.ac.zw

Churchill School is a public, day and boarding school for boys aged 12 to 19 located in the Eastlea suburb of Harare, Zimbabwe.

The school had the first school pipe band in Zimbabwe. At one time, the school's pipe band was in the Guinness Book of Records for the longest piping hours. Pipers Neville Workman, Patrick Forth, Paul Harris and Clive Higgins blew their pipes for a combined 100 hours in July 1976, breaking the previous record of eighty hours.

== History ==
The school was founded in 1950 as Eastlea Boys' High School. The founding headmaster E.J. Hougaard helped inspire most of Churchill's traditions. He is credited with establishing the name of the school and its affiliation to Winston Churchill and his family, and the school mascot, the bulldog. The school operated at Roosevelt Girls High for its first two terms while building took place at Eastlea Boys High. Hougaard wrote to the then Prime Minister of the United Kingdom, Sir Winston Spencer Churchill, asking if Eastlea Boys High School could be renamed after him, and permission was granted. Since then the school has been known as Churchill School.

At one time, Churchill School had the largest telescope in Zimbabwe, a 14-inch reflector telescope on the headmaster's roof. In the early history of the school it also had cadets. The school's pipe band has competed at the world championships in Scotland four times.

== Houses ==
Two boarding houses, which had about 180 pupils, were named Winston and Spencer houses. The games houses (Akroyd, Beaumont, Cardell, Hamilton, Maxwell and Wakeham) recall pilots who died in the Battle of Britain. These houses compete in sports and cultural activities for the Governor's Cup.

== Sport ==
The school offers a number of sporting disciplines such as rugby, baseball, hockey, cricket, basketball, tennis, soccer, water polo, volleyball, golf, swimming, athletics, cross country, and squash. It competes with Harare's other big sporting schools, mainly St George's College, St John's College and Prince Edward School.

Former pupil Derek Chisora went on to challenge for the heavyweight championship of the world in boxing. Another former pupil, Blessing Muzarabani, has had a successful career playing cricket for the Zimbabwe national team.

== See also ==
- List of schools in Zimbabwe
- List of boarding schools
