= Walter Beaumont =

British flying ace of WWII

- Born: 21 March 1914; Dewsbury, Yorkshire, United Kingdom
- Died: 23 September 1940 (aged 26); English Channel
- Military career
- Allegiance: United Kingdom
- Branch: Royal Air Force
- Service years: 1939–1940
- Rank: Pilot Officer
- Unit: No. 152 Squadron
- Conflicts: Second World War: Battle of Britain
- Awards: Distinguished Flying Cross

Walter Beaumont, DFC (21 March 1914 – 23 September 1940) was a British flying ace who served with the Royal Air Force (RAF) during the Second World War. He was credited with having shot down at least eight aircraft.

Born at Dewsbury, Beaumont studied at the University of London and was a prewar volunteer in the Royal Air Force Volunteer Reserve. He was working as a teacher in London on the outbreak of the Second World War and was called up for service with the RAF in September 1939. Once his training was completed he was posted to No. 152 Squadron. He flew Supermarine Spitfire fighters during the Battle of Britain, claiming several aerial victories over the English Channel and along England's southern coast. He went missing, presumed killed on 23 September 1940. He was posthumously awarded the Distinguished Flying Cross.

== Early life ==
Walter Beaumont, the son of a railway worker and his wife, was born on 21 March 1914 at Dewsbury, in Yorkshire, the United Kingdom. He had at least one brother, Ronald. He was educated at Mytholmroyd, attending Scout Road School, and went on to Hebden Bridge Grammar School. Once he completed his schooling, he went to London, where he studied at Goldsmiths' College at the University of London. Graduating with a Bachelor of Science, he then commenced a course at Carnegie Physical Training College in Leeds.

While in London, Beaumont was a member of the London University Air Squadron and then, in January 1937, he joined the Royal Air Force Volunteer Reserve. During his physical training course at Leeds, he did some of his flight instruction at the Blackburn Aircraft Flying School at Brough Aerodrome. Once his course was completed he found employment in London, as a teacher at Enfield Grammar School.

== Second World War ==
On the outbreak of the Second World War in September 1939, Beaumont was called up for service with the Royal Air Force (RAF) and commenced further training. By this time, he was married, to Doris Gosling, and had a son. Initially serving as a sergeant pilot, he was commissioned as a pilot officer on 10 December. A few days later he was posted to No. 152 Squadron. This was a newly formed fighter squadron based at Acklington which initially operated Gloster Gladiator biplane fighters but at the time of Beaumont's arrival was beginning to convert to the Supermarine Spitfire fighter. The squadron became operational in January 1940 and was tasked with patrolling the coastline and protecting shipping convoys.

=== Battle of Britain ===
In July, with the Battle of Britain now underway, No. 152 Squadron was sent to Warmwell, in No. 10 Group's sector, to join in Fighter Command's efforts to intercept incoming Luftwaffe raids over the English Channel. On 8 August Beaumont's Spitfire was damaged in an engagement with Messerschmitt Bf 109 fighters that were escorting a group of Junkers Ju 87 dive bombers attacking a convoy as it passed the Isle of Wight. He had to put his stricken aircraft down at Langton Matravers.

Beaumont made his first claims on 12 August, for two Junkers Ju 88 medium bombers that were damaged over St Catherine's Point. Four days later, flying to the east of the Isle of Wight, he shot down two Bf 109s. In the afternoon of 18 August, what is now known as The Hardest Day, No. 152 Squadron was scrambled to patrol over Portsmouth in response to the detection of a large Luftwaffe bombing raid. It was then directed eastward of the Isle of Wight, and Beaumont caught and destroyed a pair of Ju 87s that had just attacked Thorney Island, as well as sharing in the shooting down of a Bf 109.

On 22 August, Beaumont shot down a Ju 88 to the north of Barnstaple. This was followed three days later with the shooting down of a Bf 109 to the west of Portland. He shared in the destruction of a Heinkel He 111 medium bomber several miles to the southwest of Portland on 27 August, but in a subsequent engagement the same day, this time with a Ju 88, his Spitfire was damaged by return gunfire. Unharmed, Beaumont baled out and was rescued while his aircraft ditched in the English Channel.

Beaumont failed to return from a sortie on 23 September and was presumed to have been killed, with his Spitfire going down into the English Channel. He was posthumously recognised for his successes in the fighting along England's southern coast with an award of the Distinguished Flying Cross. The citation, which noted that he had been reported missing, was published in The London Gazette and read:

This officer has displayed great skill and determination in air combat against the enemy and has destroyed six of their aircraft.

— London Gazette, No. 34976, 22 October 1940

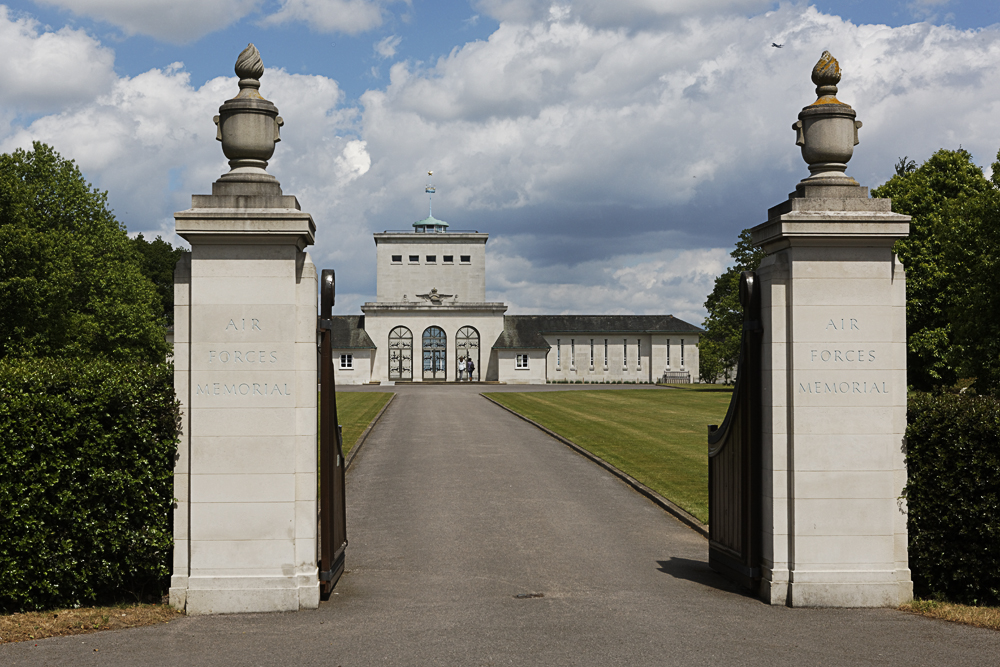
The Air Forces Memorial at Englefield Green in England, where Beaumont is commemorated

With no known grave, Beaumont is commemorated on the Runneymeade Memorial at Englefield Green. His brother Ronald, also a fighter pilot in the RAF, was killed in action in 1942 during the Western Desert campaign.

Beaumont is credited with having shot down eight aircraft, two of which being shared with other pilots, as well as damaging two others. In 1999, a memorial plaque honouring him was presented to Calder High School in Mytholmroyd, the educational successor to Hebden Bridge Grammar School which he had attended as a child. He is also the namesake for Beaumont House at Churchill School in Harare, Zimbabwe.
