= Alice Longstaff =

British woman photographer

- Born: 16 May 1907; Heptonstall
- Died: 10 January 1992 (aged 84)
- Other names: Alice Speak
- Occupation: Photographer

Alice Longstaff (1907–1992) was a British photographer working from 1921 in Hebden Bridge, West Yorkshire.

Longstaff was born in 1907 on Little Lear Ings farm near Heptonstall in the Calderdale borough of West Yorkshire. She left school at 14 in 1921 and was apprenticed to the photographer Ada Westerman (Mrs Ada Redman). Westerman had continued the Westerman Studio in Hebden Bridge, founded in 1890 by her father Crossley Westerman, after he died in 1918. In 1935 Longstaff married and her family took over as owners of the studio. Her brother was the picture framer and darkroom technician. Her husband took over as picture framer after her brother died in 1963. The business continued until her death in 1992.

In the late 1930s she added a Rolleiflex camera to her equipment allowing greater photographic flexibility, especially outside the studio. Longstaff's main income was from wedding and portraits, but she also took many photographs of the small town, its people and surroundings. These are now an important archive of local life and changes in a small town over the 70 years of her career.

Longstaff died 10 January 1992. She had kept the studio's negatives and equipment, so providing unusual insight into the development of photography as well as local history. These extended from the foundation of the studio in 1890s so included photographs by her predecessors. This material was catalogued and preserved. Her photographs are now archived at Pennine Heritage. Many have been digitised for on-line access.

There was an exhibition of her photography in the Town Hall, Hebden Bridge in October 2023 and End of the Roll: the Photographs of Alice Longstaff, a book of some of her photographs, was published in 2024.
