= Edward Cronshaw =

English sculptor

Edward Cronshaw is an English sculptor. Cronshaw works exclusively in natural materials—wood, stone, fruit, bone—and casts them in bronze. His work is usually representative, but attempts to maintain the innate characteristics of the original material.

== Beginnings ==
Cronshaw was born near Blackburn, Lancashire, but brought up in the rural Pendle district, near a hill named Cronshaw's Seat. The farm was sold in 1997 although Cronshaw no longer lived there at that time. At present he lives in the West Riding town of Todmorden, in the Calderdale metropolitan district. His career as a sculptor began while he was living at Hebden Bridge.

Blackburn was Cronshaw's childhood home; he did a foundation course at Blackburn College. From there he went on to the Leeds School of Art and finished his BA at Saint Martin's School of Art in 1984.

In the years 1985 to 1986, Cronshaw studied for an MA in fine art at the Royal College of Art.

== Exhibitions and major works ==
Cronshaw's work has been displayed at galleries and exhibitions including the Rebecca Hossack gallery (London), the Caz gallery (Los Angeles), the Henry Moore Gallery (Leeds), the Royal Academy Summer Show, the Los Angeles International Contemporary Art Fair, the Liverpool Garden Festival and the Third World and Beyond International Art Fair in Sicily.

Cronshaw was commissioned to create sculptures for Liverpool City Council and for Boots head office in Nottingham. The latter was a 20 feet (6.1 m) statue of the earth goddess Gaia, Gaia's body clothed in 3,000 succulent plants intended to suggest the transitory nature of life. The statue was cast by means of the lost wax method at Cronshaw's studio/foundry at the Dean Clough complex in Halifax, Calderdale.

The sculpture created for Liverpool City Council was named 'The Great Escape' by Cronshaw. It is a bronze horse, 15 feet (4.6 m) high and 4 tons in weight, formed entirely from rope in a spaghetti fashion. At the tail a piece of rope extends to the ground where a life-size sculpture of a man steps on it, forcing the horse to rear and apparently unravel itself.

Currently Cronshaw is continuing to work on his popular Midas Project of bronze succulent plants, as well as initiating a campaign to improve the environment of his adopted home of Todmorden by placing sculptures in and around the town centre.
