= Hebden Bridge Town Hall =

Municipal building in Hebden Bridge, West Yorkshire, England

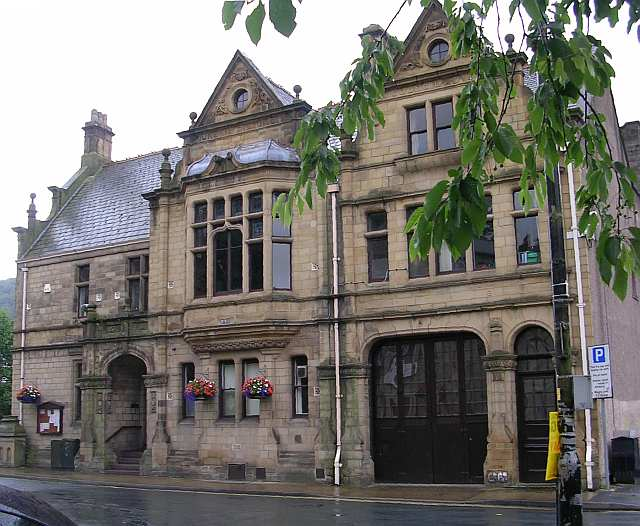
- Hebden Bridge Town Hall

- Shown in West Yorkshire
- 53.7425°N 2.0131°W
- Location: St George's Street, Hebden Bridge

History
- Built: 1898

Site notes
- Architect(s): Sutcliffe and Sutcliffe
- Architectural style: Jacobean style

Listed Building – Grade II
- Official name: District Council Offices, St George's Square
- Designated: 21 June 1984
- Reference no.: 1230338

Hebden Bridge Town Hall, formerly Hebden Bridge Council Offices, is a municipal building in St George's Street, Hebden Bridge, West Yorkshire, England. The town hall, which is the meeting place of Hebden Royd Town Council, is a Grade II listed building.

== History ==
Following significant population growth, largely associated with clothing manufacturing, Hebden Bridge became an urban district in 1894. In this context the new civic leaders decided to procure a town hall: the site they selected was on the west bank of the Hebden Water.

The new building was designed by a local firm, Sutcliffe and Sutcliffe, in the Jacobean style, built in ashlar stone and was officially opened on 11 May 1898. The design involved an asymmetrical main frontage with four bays facing onto St George's Street; the left hand section of two bays featured, in the right hand bay, an porch with an arch and a keystone on the ground floor and a mullioned and transomed window on the first floor. The central section featured a prominent oriel window on the first floor, while the right hand section featured a wide arched opening and a doorway to the former fire station, a five light mullioned and transomed window on the first floor and a three light window on the second floor. The central and right hand sections were surmounted by pedimented gables with oculi in the tympana. Internally, the principal room was the council chamber, which featured wooden panelling, on the first floor.

A war memorial, in the form of a brass plaque, to commemorate the lives of local service personnel who had died in the Second Boer War, was unveiled in the entrance hall of the building in 1902.

The building continued to serve as the headquarters of Hebden Bridge Urban District Council and, from 1937, of Hebden Royd Urban District Council, but it ceased to be the local seat of government when the enlarged Calderdale Metropolitan Borough Council was formed in 1974. The building, which was subsequently underused, began to deteriorate: however, a not-for-profit entity, Hebden Bridge Community Association, was formed and went on to acquire the building on a 40-year lease (subsequently extended to 125 years), along with sufficient funds to carry out basic maintenance work, on 1 April 2010.

With financial support from the European Regional Development Fund and Community Builders Fund, the community association then redeveloped an adjacent site to the southwest of the town hall which had been used as a car park. The works, which were carried to a design by Bauman Lyons, involved the construction of a modern structure for community and business use: the new development which cost £3.7 million was named the Waterfront Hall and opened in August 2012. The BBC Radio 4 programme, Any Questions? was broadcast from the new Waterfront Hall shortly after it opened. Meanwhile, the town hall continued to serve as the meeting place of Hebden Royd Town Council.
