= Hebden Water =

River in Calderdale, England

Coordinates: 53°44′27″N 2°00′56″W

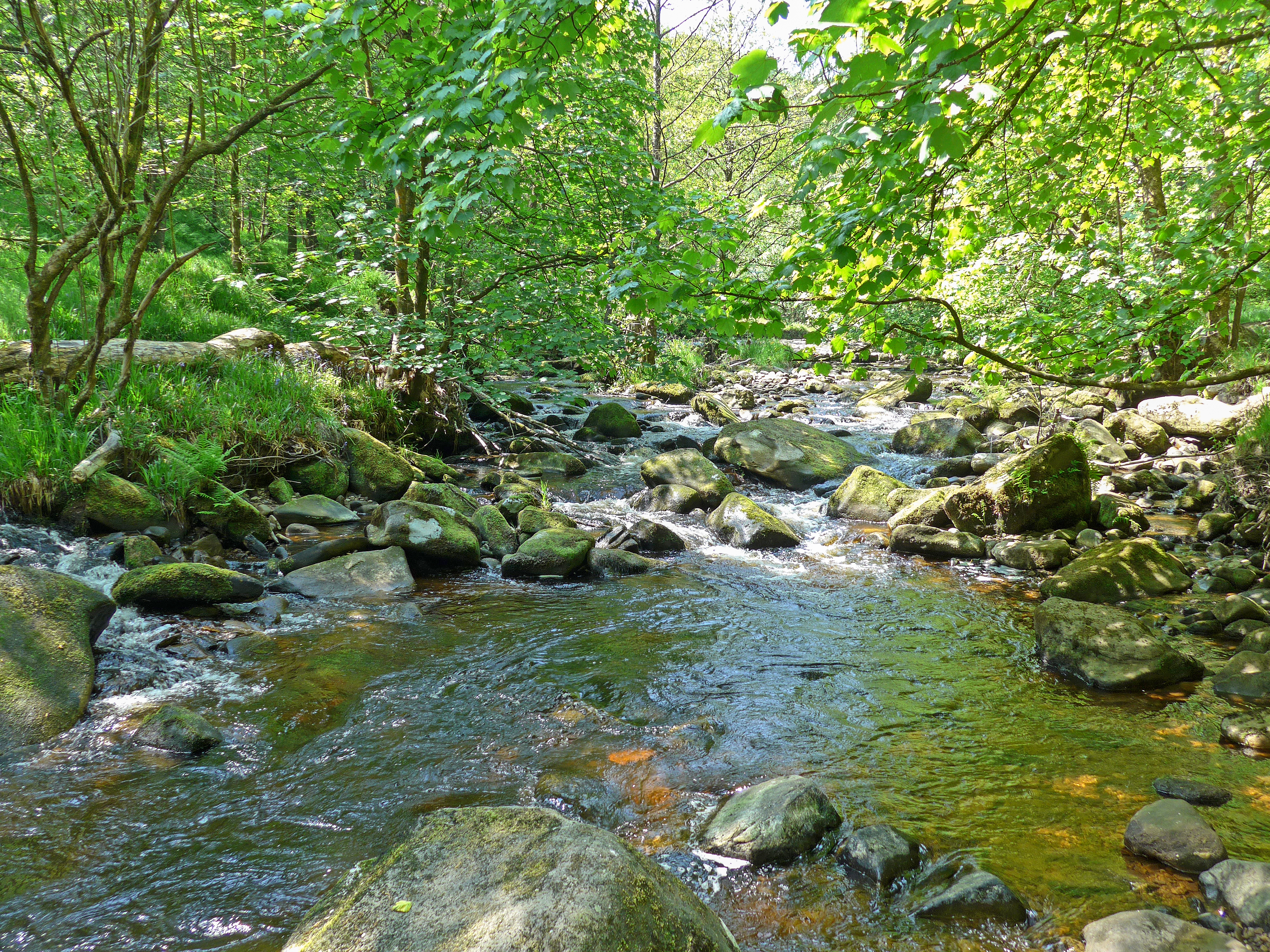

Hebden Water (alternative name: River Hebden) is a short river in Calderdale, West Yorkshire, flowing for about 7.5 kilometres (4.7 mi) generally south-eastward from the confluence of two upland streams, Graining Water and Alcomden Water, to the River Calder at Hebden Bridge. Its wooded valley is a much-visited beauty spot, but it has many times flooded in its lower stretches.

== Toponymy ==
The name is first recorded in 1279 as aqua de Heppedene. Hebden comes from Old English hēopa + denu, meaning 'bramble or wild rose valley'.

== Course ==
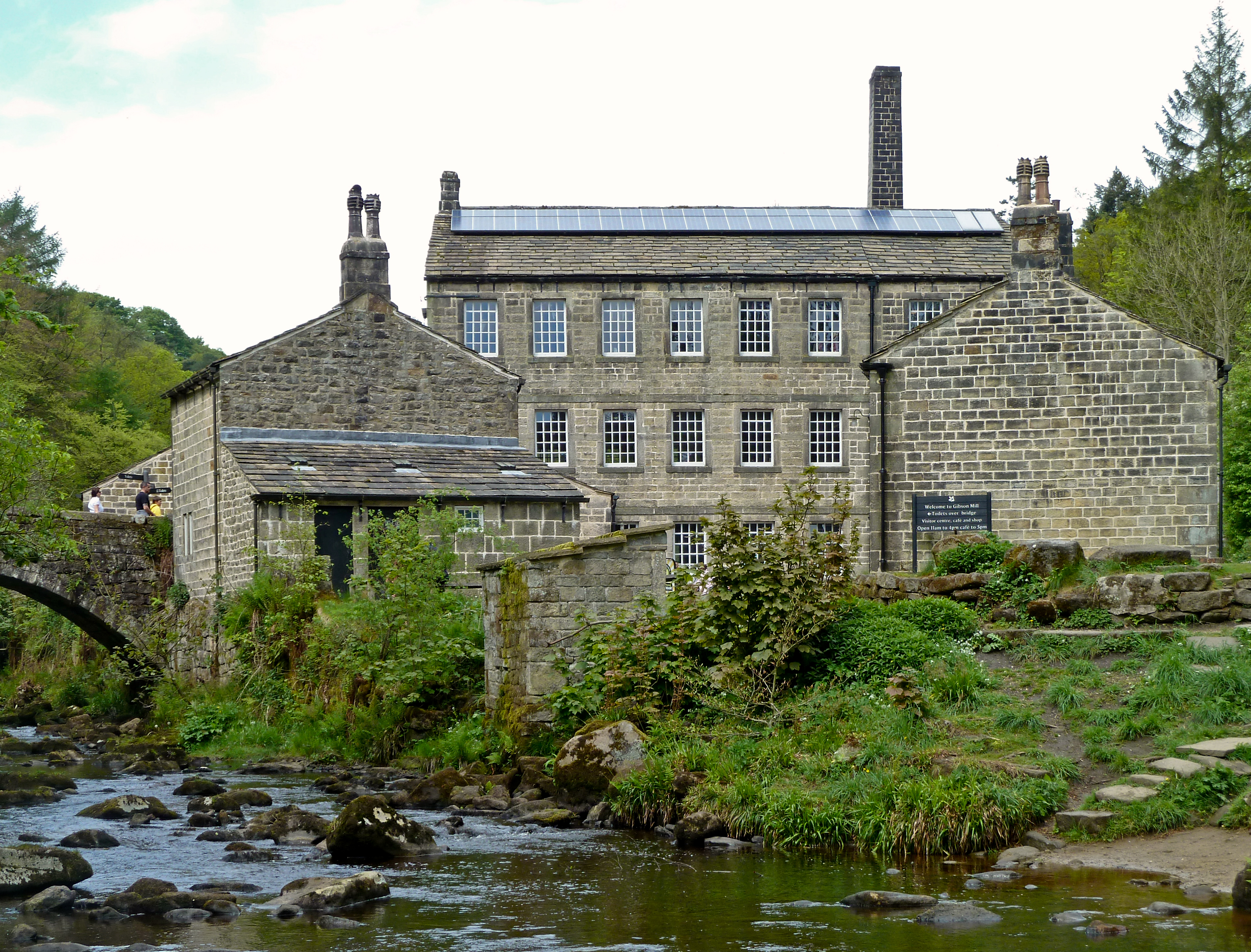
Gibson Mill on Hebden Water

Hebden Water is formed by the union of two streams: Graining Water, which flows generally south-eastward, and Alcomden Water, which flows generally southward, both rising near the Lancashire/West Yorkshire county boundary on the southern slopes of Boulsworth Hill. One of the headwaters of Graining Water, Old Hay Dike, feeds Widdop Reservoir, while another, Reaps Water, feeds Gorple Upper and Lower reservoirs. Alcomden Water has been dammed in three places to form Walshaw Dean Upper, Middle, and Lower Reservoirs. Hebden Water, beginning between Blake Dean and Black Dean at Grid Reference SD959314, flows first eastward and then southward through a steep-sided wooded valley, Hebden Dale, passing Gibson Mill and the rocks of Hardcastle Crags. It then turns eastward and is joined from the north by Crimsworth Dean Beck before reverting to a southward course. The valley opens out somewhat as it approaches the town of Hebden Bridge. In Hebden Bridge the river debouches into the River Calder at Grid Reference SD991271.

== Topography and hydrology ==
Hebden Water is approximately 7.5 kilometres (4.7 mi) in length. The catchment of Hebden Water covers an area of 59 square kilometres (23 sq mi), of which about 20 square kilometres (7.7 sq mi) in the upper reaches drain into the reservoirs mentioned above. The water quality of the river was in 2019 recorded as moderate for ecological status (likewise in 2022), but it failed on the score of its chemical composition. The lower stretches are prone to flooding, which has often impacted the town of Hebden Bridge, but measures to reduce the risk of flood have been undertaken by the National Trust, which owns most of the upper section of the river, and the volunteer group Slow the Flow. These include the creation of leaky dams on feeder streams and the thinning of woodland to encourage undergrowth.

== Attractions ==
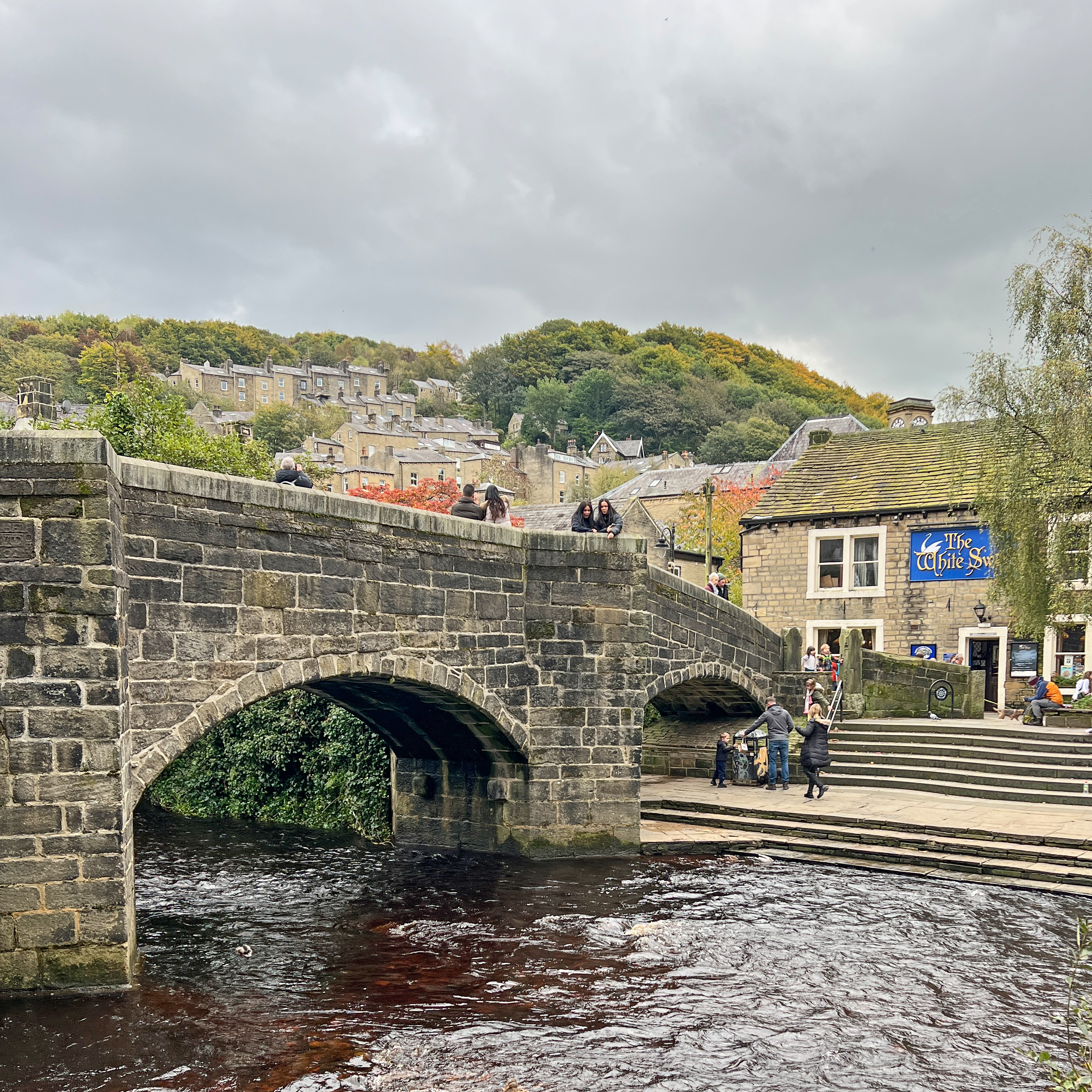
The Old Bridge in Hebden Bridge

The wooded valley of the Hebden Water, also known as Hebden Vale, is considered attractive and picturesque, having a history of attracting visitors as a picnic spot on Sundays and Bank Holidays. There are public footpaths running along the river's banks for most of its length, and Hebden Water itself has been called "probably the best local run of its kind in West Yorkshire" for canoeists and kayakers.

Standing on the banks of Hebden Water is Gibson Mill, one of the earliest Industrial Revolution cotton mills, dating from c. 1800. It is now a Grade II listed building, and has been renovated by its owner, the National Trust, as a visitor and education attraction.

Hebden Water is in its short course crossed by six bridges listed for their architectural interest, at Grade II unless otherwise stated:

- West End Bridge, West End, Hebden Bridge, built in 1771–1772;
- the Old Bridge, Bridge Gate, Hebden Bridge, built c. 1510 (Grade II*, also a scheduled monument);
- St George's Bridge, St George's Square, Hebden Bridge, built in 1892;
- Foster Mill Bridge, Slater Bank Lane, Hebden Bridge, probably built in the late 18th century;
- New Bridge, Midge Hole Road, Wadsworth, built in the 18th or early 19th century; and
- Gibson's Bridge, Hardcastle Crags, Heptonstall, built in the early 19th century.

There are also early 19th-century Grade II listed bridges over Graining Water at Blake Dean, and over Alcomden Water at Holme Ends.
