= Calder High School =

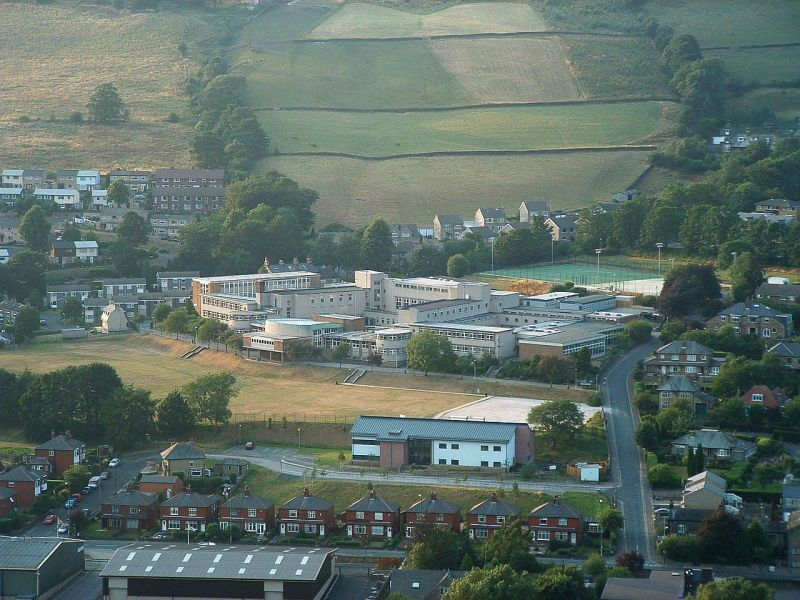

Location
- Brier Hey Lane; Mytholmroyd; Hebden Bridge, West Yorkshire, HX7 5QN; England; 53°43′57″N 1°58′31″W

Information
- Motto: Everybody, everyday
- Local authority: Calderdale
- Specialist: Technology
- Department for Education URN: 107562 Tables
- Ofsted: Reports
- Chair: TBC
- Headteacher: Andy Taylor
- Gender: Coeducational
- Age: 11 to 16
- Enrolment: 1,277
- Colours: House Colours (Red, Yellow, Green and Blue)
- Former name: Hebden Bridge Grammar School
- Website: https://www.calderlearningtrust.com/

Calder High School is a coeducational comprehensive school. It specialises in technology, with technology rooms. It is located in the village of Mytholmroyd, in the metropolitan district of Calderdale, in northern England.

It is situated in the middle of the village, north of the A646.

== History ==
Prior to the 1950s students attended the local Hebden Bridge Grammar School, until Calder High opened in May 1952. The new school was part of reforms of post-war education where buildings were designed to be modern and provide secondary education not just the few, but the many. Designed by the architects department of West Riding County Council with models made by Thorp Modelmakers of London, Calder originally had a quad of classrooms with longitudinal wings, enclosing twin playgrounds. In 1963, a new science block, school theatre and bus bays were added. On 28 December 1969, Songs of Praise was shown from the school. By the 1970s it had 1200 boys and girls. Until April 1974, it was administered by the Calder Divisional Executive of West Riding County Council.

More recently, a new Sixth Form building was added and officially opened on 12 July 2004 by outgoing headteacher David Scott. At the start of the 2007 academic year, the school theatre was renamed 'The Ted Hughes Theatre' and was re-opened and named under the consent of Ted Hughes' widow.

In April 2019, the school car park just off Brier Hey Lane became decommissioned to become the ground for the new English teaching block containing nine classrooms. This project was completed in August 2019 and was opened ready for the 2019-2020 academic year in September 2019. In 2025 the school converted to an Academy as it became part of the Pennine Alliance Learning Trust, later that year a project to open an alternative provision unit was established at the school using a modular building to the rear of the building, it opened in November 2025.

== Activities ==
In October 2006, the school obtained a license to run a week-long radio station, broadcast directly from the school. The radio was named Royd FM. The success of this project led to Royd FM broadcasting again in December 2007. This has since been discontinued and the studio is now used as an office by the Head of Media Studies.

Each year, since 1952, students of Calder High put on the Easter-time performance of the Pace Egg Play in the surrounding area. In both 1974 and 1975 students from the school appeared on BBC One's Play for Today

== All-through school ==
Calder High School is federated with Calder Primary School under the title of The Calder Learning Trust. This means that technically it is an all-through school educating pupils aged 4 to 16. However, while management and administration is shared, both schools continue to operate with separate identities.

== Alumni ==
- Josh Fenton-Glynn, Member of Parliament
- Kirk Barker, actor
- Dario Coates, actor
- Geoff Crowther, guidebook writer
- Stuart Fielden, former professional rugby league footballer
- Jessica Harris, actress
- Thomas Nelstrop, actor, comedian, and voiceover artist
- Lindsay Rimer, victim of unsolved murder in 1994
- Robert Scott, professional cyclist and former u23 British Champion

=== Hebden Bridge Grammar School ===
- Paul Barker, broadcaster, editor from 1968-86 of New Society
- Walter Beaumont, flying ace with the Royal Air Force during the Second World War
- Sir Bernard Ingham, journalist and former civil servant
- Graham Richardson, former British bobsleigh pilot, former Canadian bobsleigh driver coach, head coach of the British Bobsleigh team

== Accreditation ==
- Technology College
- Training School
