= Hardcastle Crags =

Pennine valley in West Yorkshire, England

Coordinates: 53.7650°N 2.0424°W

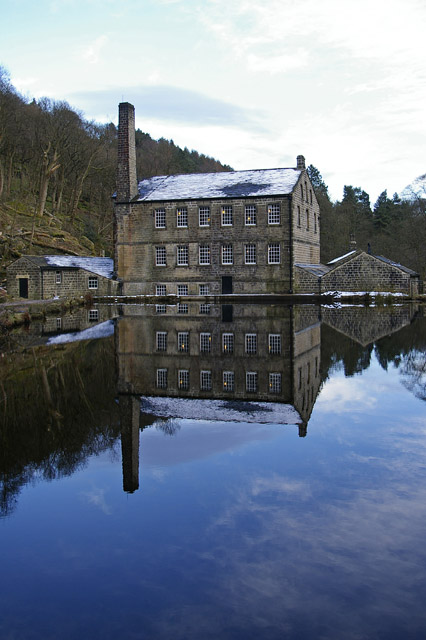
Gibson Mill and the mill pond

Hardcastle Crags is a wooded Pennine valley in West Yorkshire, England, owned by the National Trust. Historically part of the West Riding of Yorkshire, it lies approximately 2 miles (3.2 km) north of the town of Hebden Bridge and 10 miles (16 km) west of the town of Halifax. It gave the title to a poem by Sylvia Plath which was included in her 1960 debut collection, The Colossus and Other Poems.

== Gibson Mill ==
Approximately half a mile along the valley there is a 19th-century cotton mill called Gibson Mill. The mill was water powered and has been renovated to demonstrate renewable energy sources and a sustainability strategy. It is surrounded by 400 acres (1.6 km^{2}) of unspoilt woodland and crossed by 30 miles (48 km) of footpaths. The former cotton mill was one of the first powered mills built at the start of the Industrial Revolution.

Water powered turbines, photo voltaic panels, composting toilets, a wood-burning boiler, a wood-burning cocklestove and locally sourced reclaimed interior materials have gone into making the venture sustainable.

The mill, a grade II listed building, reopened to the public on Saturday, 24 September 2005, and there are exhibits about the mill and its workers.

== Gallery ==
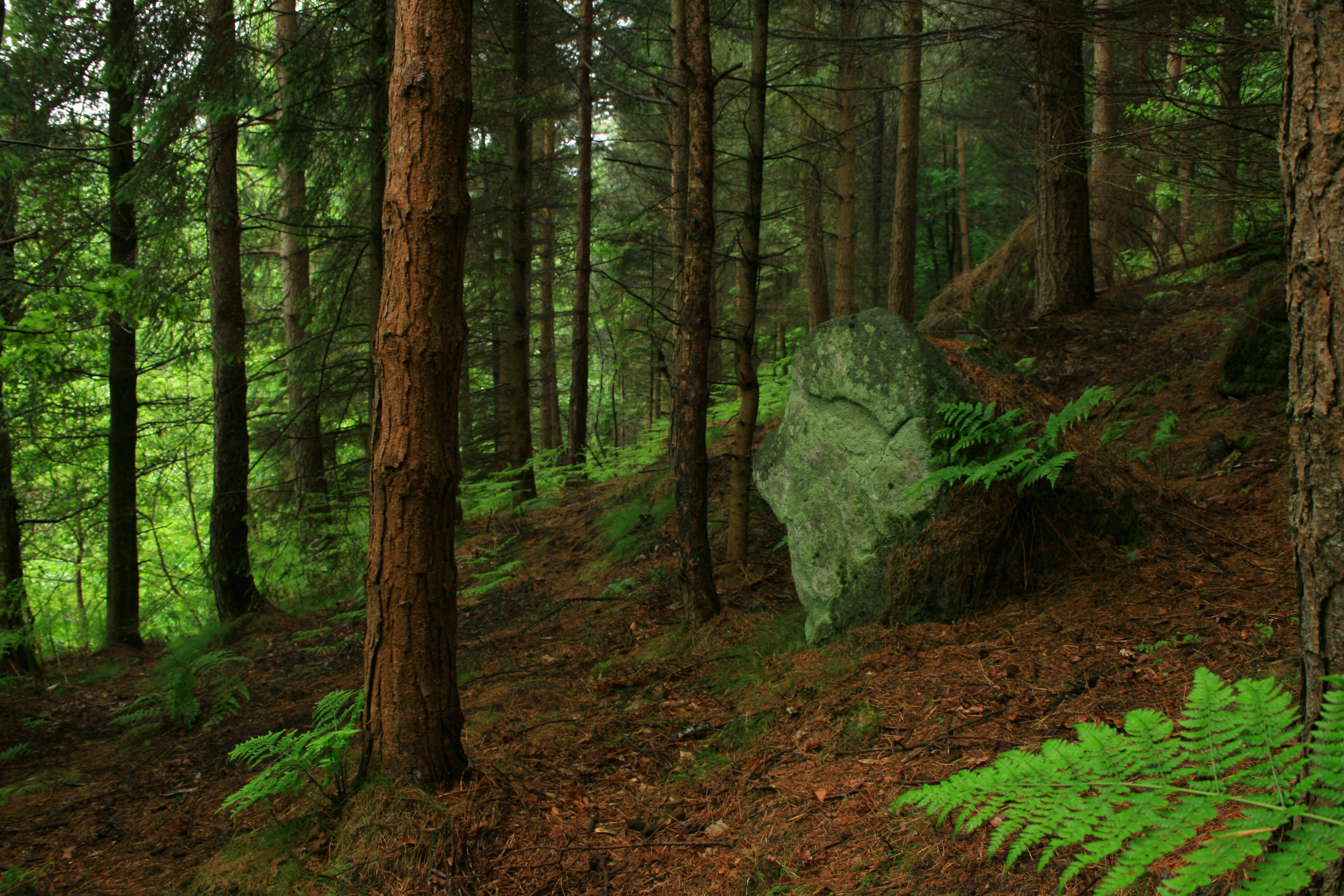
Woodland at Hardcastle Crags

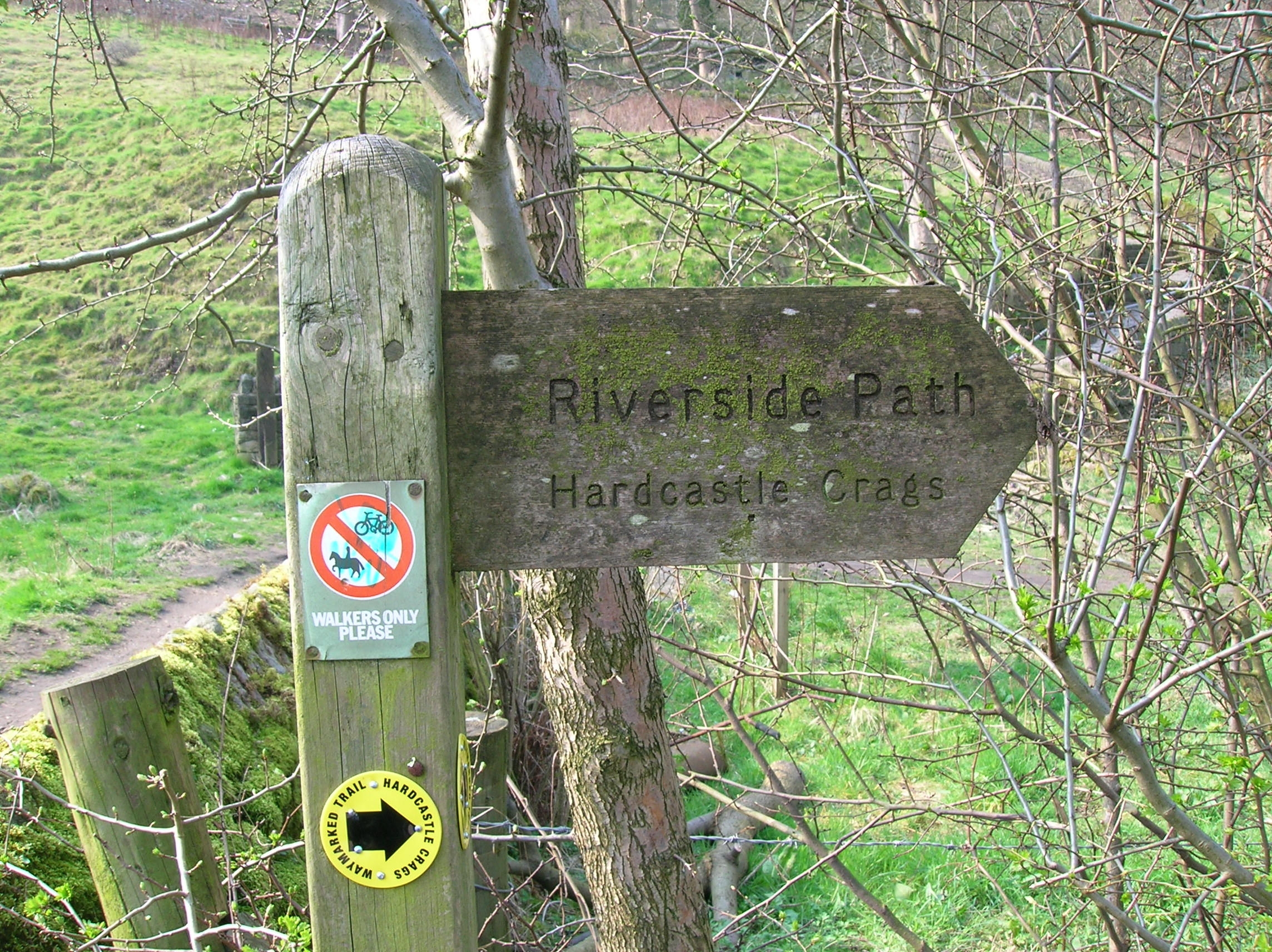
Hardcastle Crags signpost

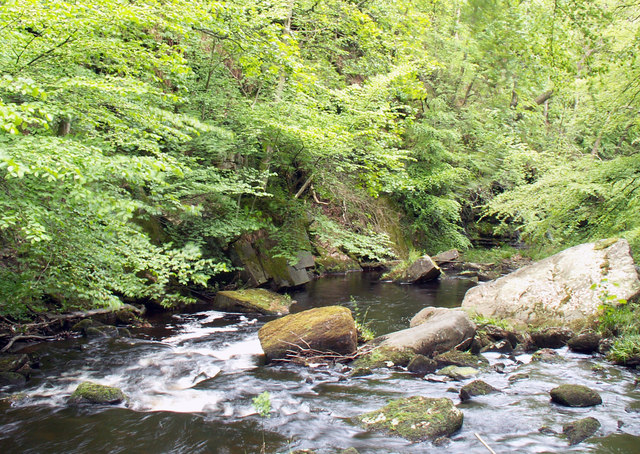
River Hebden

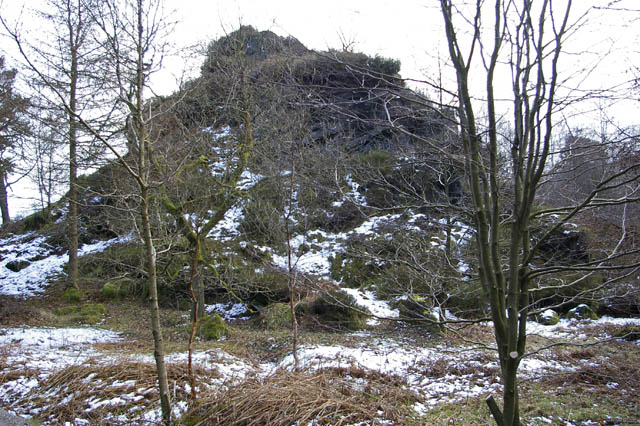
Foliage

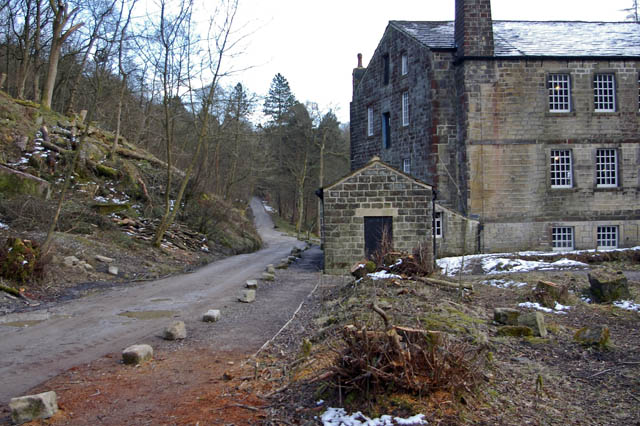
Gibson Mill

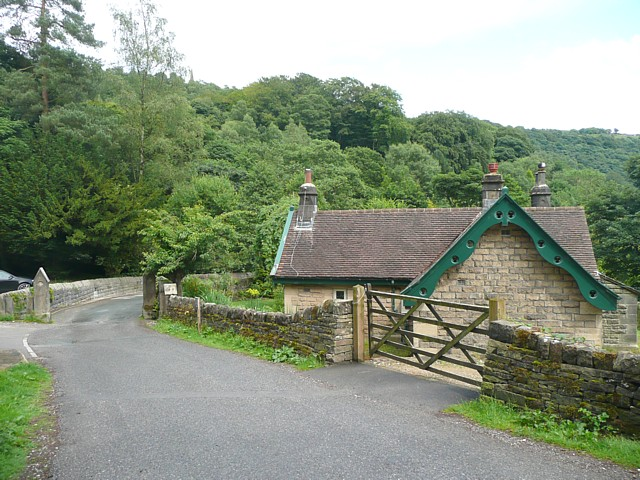
Entrance to the National Trust land
