= Hebden Bridge =

Town in West Yorkshire, England

Coordinates: 53.742°N 2.009°W

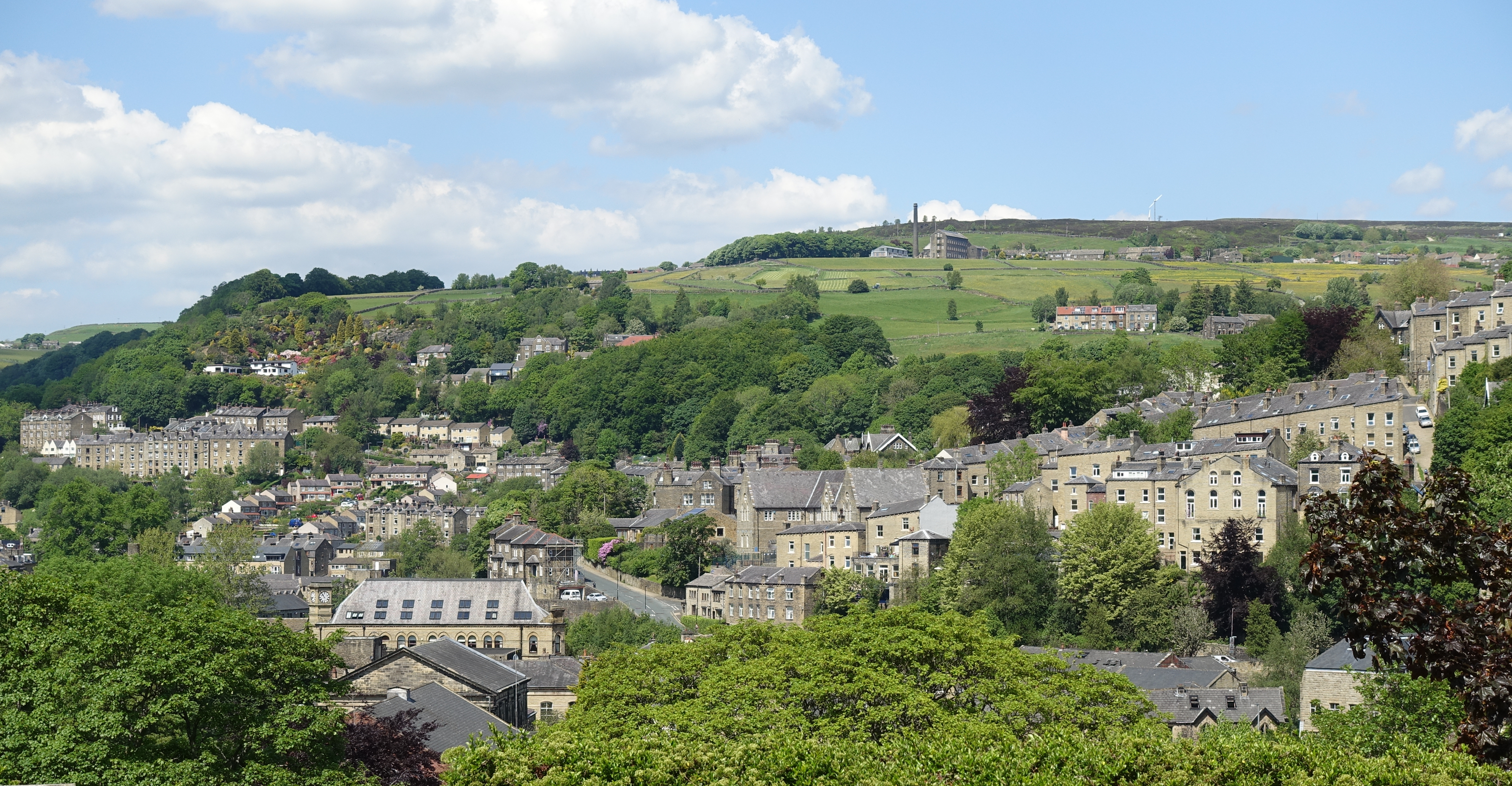
- Hebden Bridge

- Location within West Yorkshire
- Population: 4,500
- OS grid reference: SD 993 273
  - London: 170 mi (270 km) SSE
- Civil parish: Hebden Royd
- Metropolitan borough: Calderdale
- Metropolitan county: West Yorkshire
- Region: Yorkshire and the Humber
- Country: England
- Sovereign state: United Kingdom
- Post town: HEBDEN BRIDGE
- Postcode district: HX7
- Dialling code: 01422
- Police: West Yorkshire
- Fire: West Yorkshire
- Ambulance: Yorkshire
- UK Parliament: Calder Valley

Hebden Bridge is a market town in the civil parish of Hebden Royd, in the Calderdale district of West Yorkshire, England. It is in the Upper Calder Valley, 8 miles (13 km) west of Halifax and 14 miles (21 km) north-east of Rochdale, at the confluence of the River Calder and Hebden Water. The town is the largest settlement in the civil parish of Hebden Royd.

In 2015, the Calder ward, covering Hebden Bridge, Old Town, and part of Todmorden, had a population of 12,167. The town had a population of 4,500 as of 2024.

== History ==
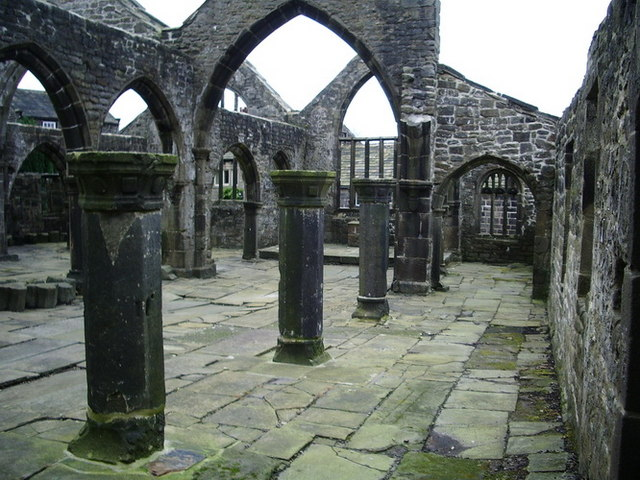
The old ruined church of Heptonstall

The original settlement was the hilltop village of Heptonstall. Hebden Bridge (Heptenbryge) started as a settlement where the Halifax to Burnley packhorse route dropped into the valley and crossed the River Hebden where the old bridge (from which it gets its name) stands. The name Hebden comes from the Anglo-Saxon Heopa Denu, 'Bramble (or possibly Wild Rose) Valley'.

Steep hills with fast-flowing streams and access to major wool markets meant that Hebden Bridge was ideal for water-powered weaving mills and the town developed during the 19th and 20th centuries; it is said that at one time Hebden was known as "Trouser Town" because of the large amount of clothing manufacturing. Watercolour artist Thomas Frederick Worrall, who lived in nearby Pecket Well, depicted the mills in around 1900. Drainage of the marshland, which covered much of the Upper Calder Valley before the Industrial Revolution, enabled construction of the road which runs through the valley. Before it was built, travel was only possible via the ancient packhorse route which ran along the hilltop, dropping into the valleys wherever necessary. The wool trade was served by the Rochdale Canal (running from Sowerby Bridge to Manchester) and the Manchester & Leeds Railway (later the Lancashire & Yorkshire Railway) (running from Leeds to Manchester and Burnley).

Hebden Bridge also grew to include a Picture House (seating 500), which remains open to the present day, and offices for Hebden Bridge Urban District Council. Hebden Bridge has no swimming pool, although for some years there was a small training pool for children in the adult education centre on Pitt Street. Hebden Bridge had its own cooperative society but, during the 1960s, it was defrauded and went bankrupt. The old Co-op building became a hotel and was later converted into flats. The Co-op returned in the 1980s with a supermarket on Market Street, on the site of an old mill.

During the Second World War Hebden Bridge was designated a "reception area" and took in evacuees from industrial cities.

During the 1970s and 1980s the town saw an influx of artists, writers, photographers, musicians, alternative practitioners, teachers, Green and New Age activists and more recently, wealthier 'yuppie' types. This in turn saw a boom in tourism to the area. During the 1990s Hebden Bridge became a commuter town, because of its proximity to major towns and cities both sides of the Pennines and its rail links to Manchester, Bradford and Leeds.

On 6 July 2003, Hebden Bridge was granted Fairtrade Zone status. On 6 July 2014, Stage 2 of the 2014 Tour de France, from York to Sheffield, passed through the town.

== Governance ==
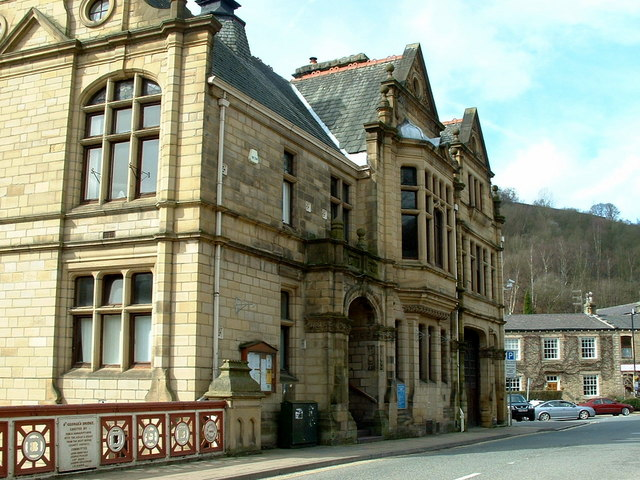
Hebden Bridge Town Hall

Hebden Bridge was a chapelry in the parish of Halifax. On 31 December 1894 Hebden Bridge became a civil parish formed from Wadsworth, Heptonstall, Erringden and Stansfield. On 1 April 1937 the parish was abolished to form Hebden Royd. In 1931 the parish had a population of 6312.

Hebden Bridge Urban District was established in 1894. In 1937, the council merged with Mytholmroyd Urban District to become Hebden Royd Urban District. Hebden Bridge Urban District was administered as part of the West Riding of Yorkshire. These were abolished in the reforms introduced in the Local Government Act 1972. They were replaced by West Yorkshire, the metropolitan borough of Calderdale and Hebden Royd Town Parish. The town council is a parish council. Recently, it has attracted praise for its commitment to eco-friendly policies, following the example of Modbury in effectively banning all plastic shopping bags, thus becoming the largest community in Europe to do so. The ban is not legally enforceable, but rather a voluntary agreement between local shop owners and the community at large.

Hebden Bridge Town Hall and adjoining fire station is a Grade II listed building, built in 1898. The building was transferred from Calderdale Metropolitan Borough Council to Hebden Bridge Community Association on a 40-year lease (now extended to 125 years) on 1 April 2010, along with funds for basic maintenance work. Substantial volunteer time was put into renovation works and fundraising to secure the building's future. The £3.7 million raised was used to create a small enterprise centre and new community facilities on land adjacent. More than 450 local people signed up as "Friends of the Town Hall" and became able to vote for the trustees.

== Geography ==
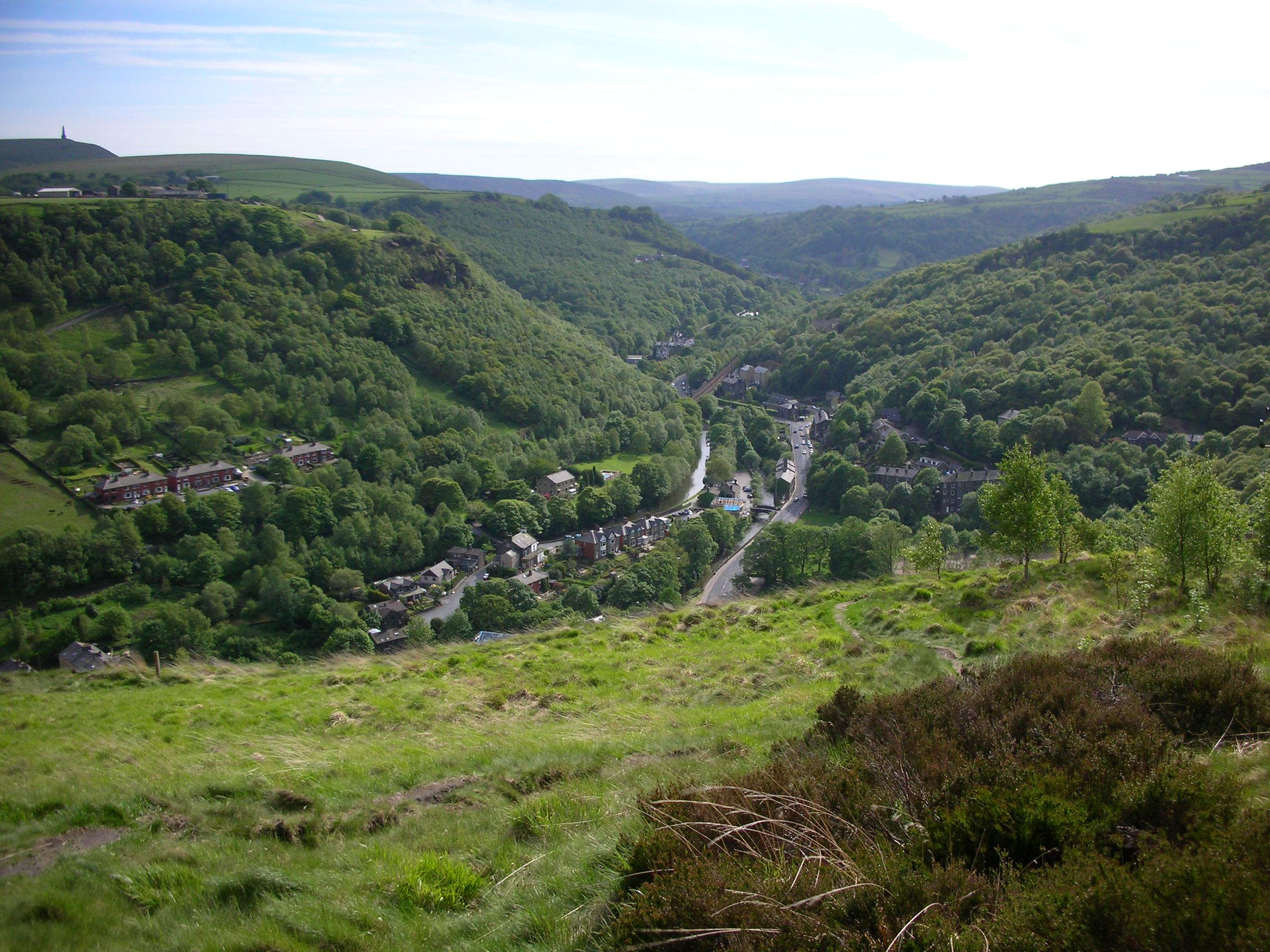
Calder Valley around Hebden Bridge

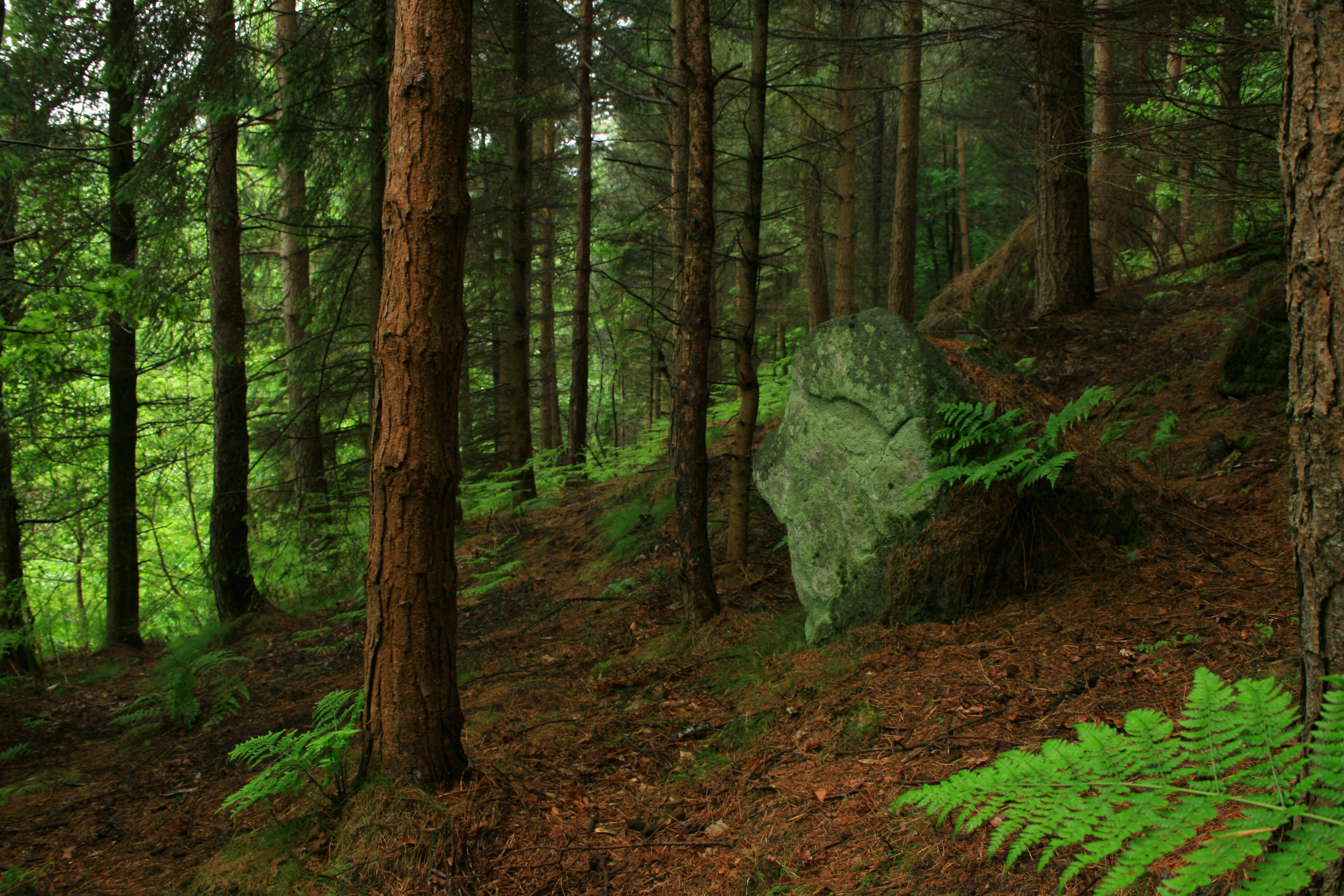
Hardcastle Crags near Hebden Bridge, a National Trust estate

Hebden Bridge lies close to the Pennine Way and Hardcastle Crags and is popular for outdoor pursuits such as walking, climbing and cycling. It lies on the Rochdale Canal – a through route across the Pennines. The town is on the route of the Calderdale Way, a circular walk of about 50 miles (80 km) around the hills and valleys of Calderdale, and it is connected with the Pennine Way through the "Hebden Bridge Loop".

=== Flooding ===
The town's location in the valley causes problems with flooding particularly between Hebden Water and the cinema on New Road, Brearley Fields in Mytholmroyd, and further up the valley at Callis Bridge by the sewage works and the old Aquaspersions factory. Flooding at Callis Bridge is so frequent that the level of the River Calder has been lowered and special perforated kerbstones fitted so that water can drain back into the river. Brearley on a flood plain contains the playing fields for Calder High School and local football, rugby league and cricket teams. Hebden Bridge suffered two devastating floods in the summer of 2012, and again on Boxing Day 2015; Todmorden, Mytholmroyd, Sowerby Bridge and York were also affected, with houses, pubs, shops and community centres suffering damage to property. The extent of the Hebden Bridge flooding was shown in drone videos of the flooded areas, the most severe flooding occurring in Hebden Bridge town centre.

== Demography ==
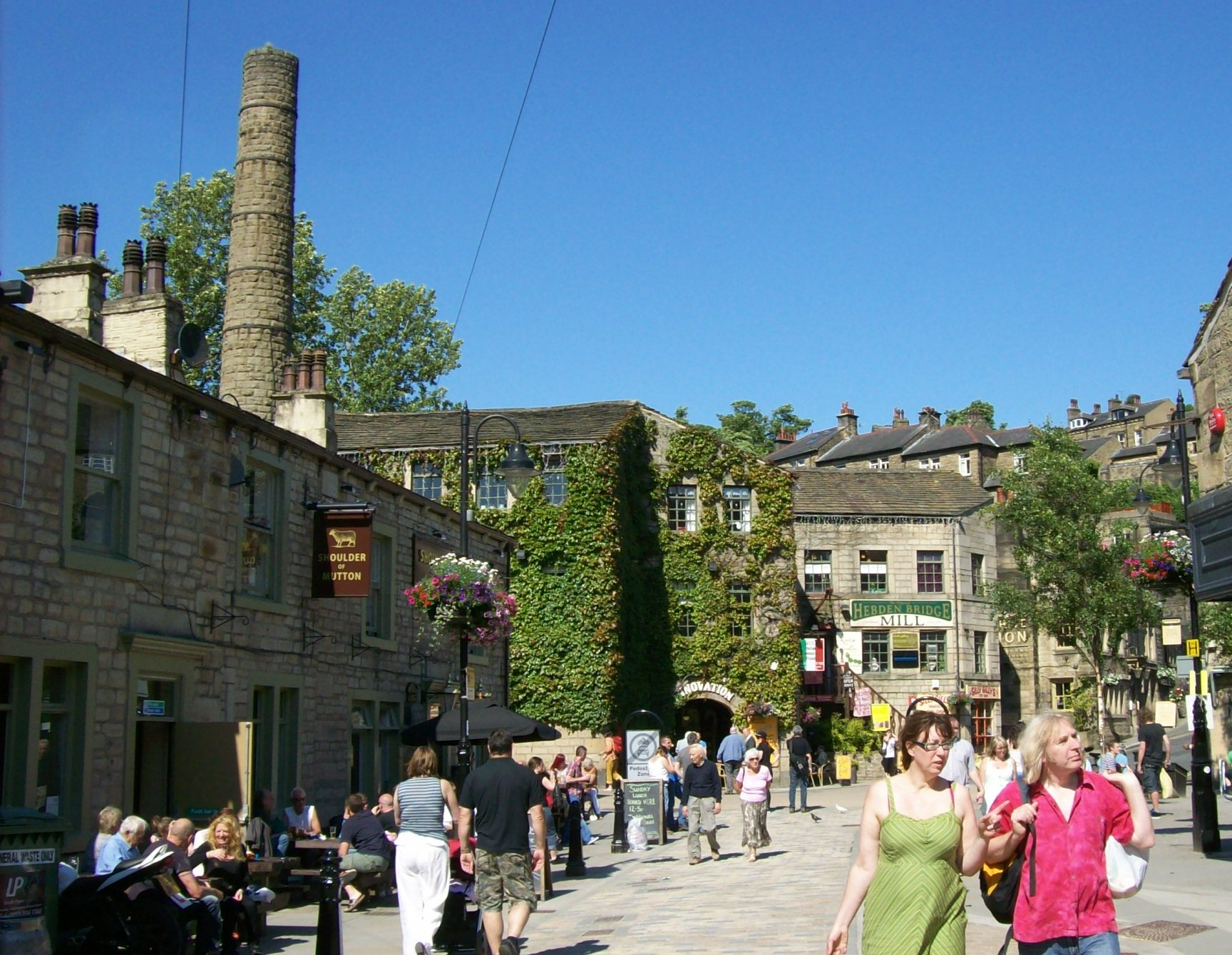
Bridge Gate in the town centre.

Hebden Bridge is a popular place to live. However, space is limited due to the steep valleys and lack of flat land. In the past, this led to "upstairs-downstairs" houses known as "over and under dwellings" (cf the back-to-back houses in nearby industrial cities). These were houses built in terraces with 4–5 storeys. The upper storeys face uphill while the lower ones face downhill with their back wall against the hillside. The bottom 2 storeys would be one house while the upper 2–3 storeys would be another. This also led to unusual legal arrangements such as the "flying freehold", where the shared floor/ceiling is wholly owned by the underdwelling.

The population of Hebden Bridge is shrinking, 2024 estimates reported 5,039 living in the town, which would be down from 5,223 in 2021, which was already down from 5,446 in 2011. This is largely due to a lack of new homes, more people living alone, and an increase in holiday homes. 94.2% of people in the town are White. 52.8% are Female and 47.2% are Male. 68.4% of people in the town are Non Religious, 27.4% are Christian, 1.4% are Buddhist, 0.7% are Muslim, 0.4% are Jewish, and 1.6% identify as other.

Population changes in the 1990s led to a demand for more houses. This has proved to be extremely controversial for a number of reasons. The limited availability of houses has meant that prices have risen sharply (for example, a house valued at £54,000 in 1998 was valued at nearly £150,000 in 2004). Demand for new houses is also a contentious issue as many of the sites for proposed development are areas such as fields or woodland that some local residents feel should be left as they are.

Hebden Bridge has attracted artists, and has developed a small New Age community. In the 1980s and 1990s, a prominent lesbian intentional community grew up in nearby Todmorden, and subsequently Hebden Bridge, "promot[ing] forms of queer intimacy outside of the nuclear family unit", with "a close-knit community of care" and mutual support, sharing childcare and community events, such as a "famous Todmorden Women’s Disco" held monthly. The nature of that community has changed with evolving queer politics, away from lesbian feminism and towards "homonormative assimilation". As of 2004, Hebden Bridge had the highest number of lesbians per head in the UK.

In April 2005, Hebden Bridge was named the fourth quirkiest place in the world by High Life (the British Airways flight magazine) and was described as "modern and stylish in an unconventional and stylish way".

The town was documented in the 2009 film Shed Your Tears And Walk Away, which made controversial claims about the levels of drug and alcohol abuse in the town, and consequent deaths among young people.

== Economy ==
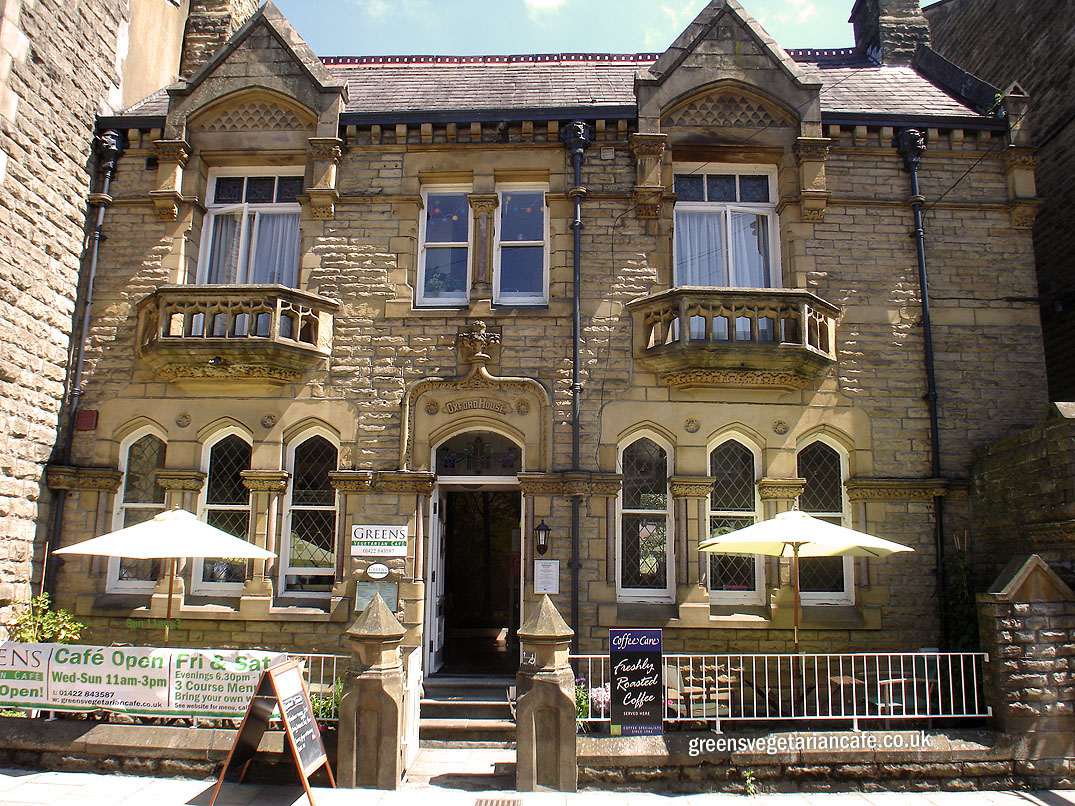
An independent business in Hebden Bridge

As of 2017, the weekly market has moved to Lees Yard adjoining the pedestrian centre of St George Square, and the market days have been increased from two and a half to four full weekly market days: Thursdays to Sundays.

Walkley's Clog Mill is one of the country's leading clog manufacturers. It moved from its original home at Falling Royd to a site on Midgley Road in Mytholmroyd.

Acre Mill was an asbestos factory in the hilltop settlement of Old Town, owned by Cape Insulation Ltd. It was opened in 1939 to meet the demand for gas mask filters made from blue asbestos during the Second World War, and diversified into the production of other asbestos products, including rope, pipe lagging and textile, after the war. In 1970, the company closed the mill and moved to Westmorland. The mill was the subject of a 1971 World in Action investigation entitled "The Dust at Acre Mill" which revealed how the factory broke the law regarding asbestos-dust control between 1940 and 1970. By 1979, 12% of a total of 2,200 former employees had asbestos-related disease. The mill was demolished in 1979. Cape Insulation also operated a second factory at Hangingroyd Mill.

Hebden Bridge has built a reputation for "great little shops" and has an unusually high density of independent shops for a UK town of its size with more than 20 cafes and tea rooms, and about 20 pubs, micro pubs and restaurants. In a national survey by the New Economics Foundation in 2010 Hebden Bridge was ranked sixth on a diversity scale and was praised for its independent shops and unique shopping experience. The Fox and Goose, West Yorkshire's first co-operative pub, is owned by 262 residents of Hebden Bridge. The co-operative was established in March 2014, when the pub was purchased from the previous owner.

In February 2016, Hebden Bridge won as the "Best Small Outdoor Market" in the Great British Market Awards run by the National Association of British Market Authorities (NABMA). In December 2016, Hebden Bridge won the "Great British High Street Award" in the "Small Market Town" category, after most shops, cafes and businesses had bounced back better and more flood resilient than before the Boxing Day floods 2015; Hebden Bridge also won a second award as the People's Choice.

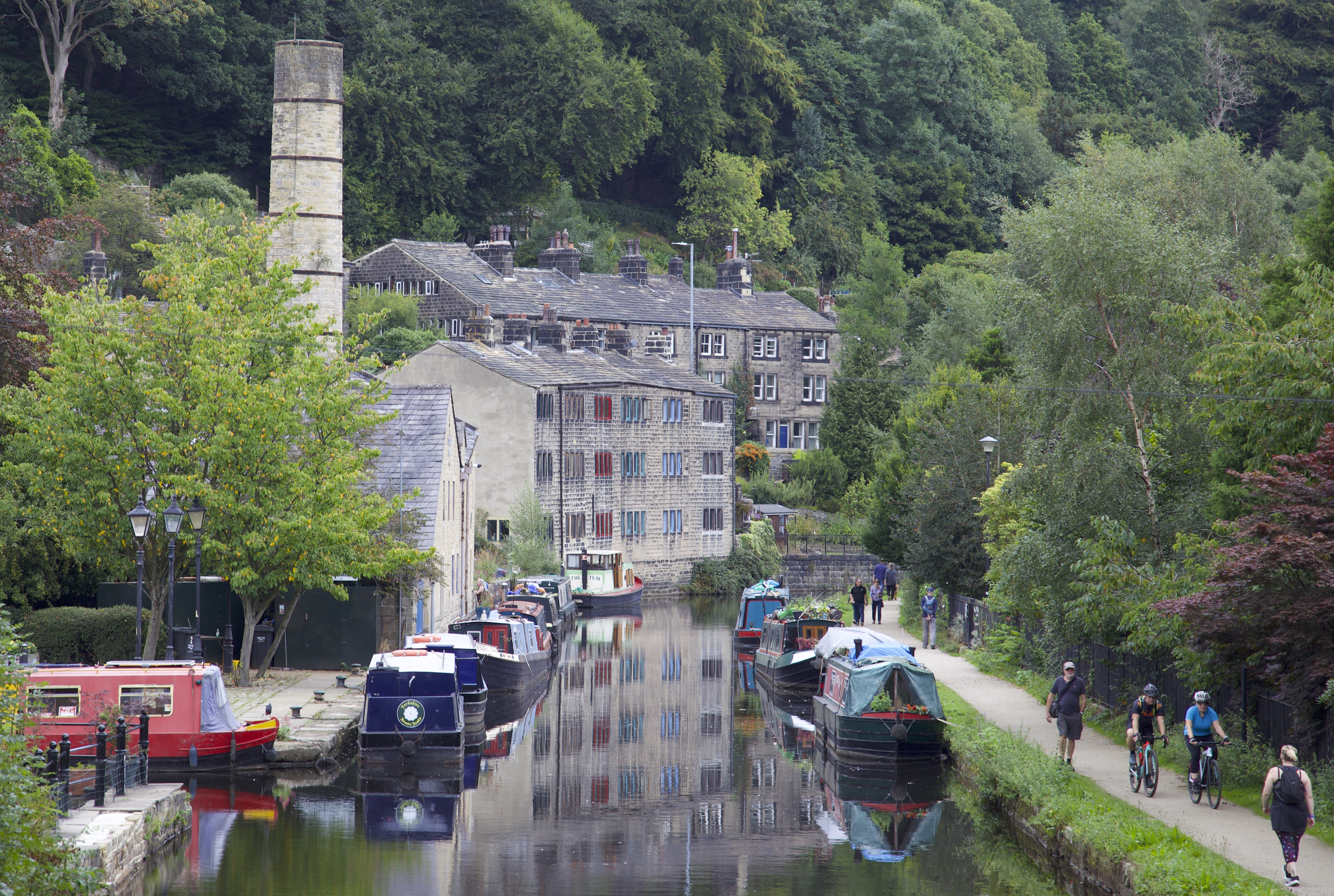
Rochdale Canal

== Culture ==
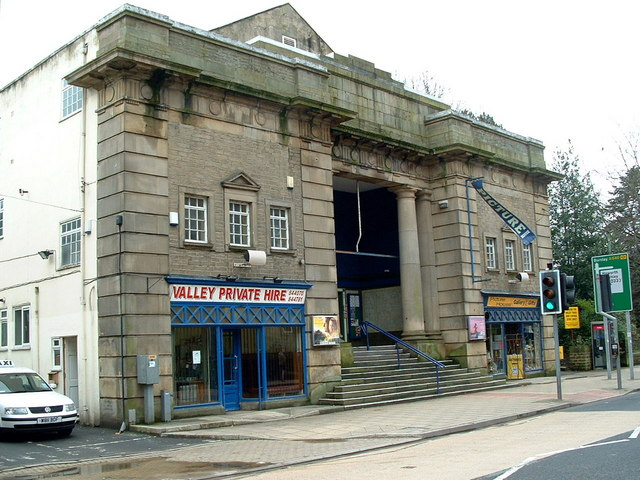
Hebden Bridge Picture House

Hebden Bridge is known as "the lesbian capital of the UK".

The Stubbing Wharf is an 18th-century inn located alongside the Rochdale Canal, in which the poet Ted Hughes set his poem "Stubbing Wharfe". Hughes was born in neighbouring Mytholmroyd, and his former home Lumb Bank on the outskirts of Hebden Bridge is run as a creative writing centre by the Arvon Trust.

The video for the Talk Talk song "My Foolish Friend" was filmed in and around Hebden Bridge in 1983. The band The Dream Academy filmed the first video for their hit single "Life in a Northern Town" in Hebden Bridge in 1984. The singer Haddaway also filmed a music video in the town in 1995 for his single "Lover Be Thy Name".

The BBC One crime drama series Happy Valley, written by Huddersfield-born Sally Wainwright, broadcast in 2014‍–‍2023, was filmed and set in and around the town. Its ironic title refers to the drug users and providers in the area. Local landmarks, such as the graveyard at St Thomas the Apostle Church, the canal and the landscapes provided a backdrop to the narrative. The show received critical acclaim and was expected to lead to a noticeable increase in local tourism. Another Wainwright series, Riot Women, screened in October 2025, was also filmed and set in the town.

=== Music ===
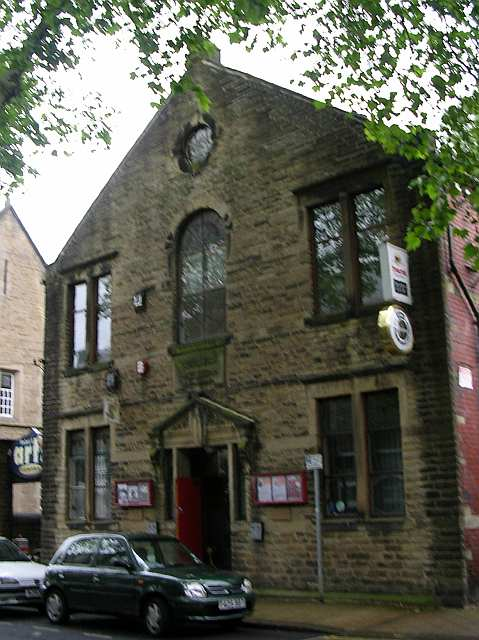
Trades Club

The Trades Club is a nationally recognised music venue and socialist members' club. In the 1980s and 90s, the club became a renowned World Music destination for touring bands from Africa and elsewhere, including Thomas Mapfumo, Ali Farka Touré, and John Chibadura. Heavenly Recordings have a close association with the Trades Club and celebrated their 25th birthday with 'A Heavenly Weekend In Hebden', a four-day festival at the Trades Club, featuring performances from many of the artists on their roster and film screenings from Heavenly Films. The event was given its own catalogue number: HVN300. The club was awarded Inspirational Venue Of The Year at the Nordoff and Robbins Northern Music Awards 2025

Until 2014, the town hosted the Hebden Bridge Blues Festival during the Spring Bank Holiday at the end of May. Established in 2011, the festival was voted the Best British Blues Festival in the 2012 and 2013 British Blues Awards.

The indie band Bogshed were formed in Hebden Bridge in 1984, originally as the 'Amazing Roy North Penis Band'.

In 2017, the Hebden Bridge Community Association received The Queen's Award for Voluntary Service, the MBE for voluntary groups.

=== Local media ===
Local news and television programmes are provided by BBC Yorkshire and ITV Yorkshire. Television signals are received from the Emley Moor and the local relay transmitters.

The town's local radio stations are BBC Radio Leeds and community station Calder Valley Radio. The area's commercial stations, which include daytime West Yorkshire news and travel, are Hits Radio West Yorkshire, Greatest Hits Radio West Yorkshire, Heart Yorkshire and Capital Yorkshire.

The Hebden Bridge Times is the town's local newspaper.

== Transport ==
Hebden Bridge railway station lies on the Calder Valley Line between Manchester Victoria and Leeds. It is served by frequent rail services to towns and cities in Lancashire, Greater Manchester, as well as West and North Yorkshire including Leeds, Blackpool North, York, Manchester Victoria and Todmorden. There are also some infrequent services to Dewsbury via Brighouse. The station is still in the original Lancashire & Yorkshire Railway colours, decorated with hanging baskets, original signage and luggage trolleys.

Bus services in the town are operated by First West Yorkshire, Keighley Bus Company and TLC Travel.

Leeds Bradford is the nearest airport, accessible by bus and train.

== Notable people ==
- Kirk Barker, actor, grew up in Hebden Bridge and was at school there.
- Richard Bedford, Grammy-nominated singer/songwriter, lives in Hebden Bridge.
- Lynn Breeze, illustrator and author of children's books, settled in and has written about Hebden Bridge.
- Horatio Clare, author, known for travel, memoir, nature and children's books, lives in the town.
- Edward Cronshaw, sculptor, began his career while living at Hebden Bridge.
- Bernard Ingham, Chief Press Secretary to Margaret Thatcher, was educated at Hebden Bridge Grammar School.
- Paula Lane, actor with roles including Kylie Platt of Coronation Street, remains a resident of the town and also runs a drama school there.
- Amy Liptrot, author of The Outrun, lives in Hebden Bridge.
- Alice Longstaff, photographer at Westerman's Studio from 1921 until 1992.
- Benjamin Myers, author and journalist, is a resident.
- Martin Parr, photographer, lived in Hebden Bridge, c. 1975–80.
- Jon Richardson, comedian, lived near Hebden Bridge with his wife Lucy Beaumont
- Lindsay Jo Rimer, a 13-year-old girl from the town, went missing in 1994. Her body was found in the Rochdale Canal the following year.
- Lavena Saltonstall (1881–1957), suffragette and writer, born and grew up in Hebden Bridge.
- Ed Sheeran, singer/songwriter, spent his early childhood in Hebden Bridge.
- Adelle Stripe, author and journalist, lives in Hebden Bridge
- Thomas Frederick Worrall (1872–1957), blacksmith and watercolour artist, lived in Peckett Well.

== See also ==
- Listed buildings in Hebden Royd
