= Property manager =

Occupation

A property manager or estate manager is a person or firm charged with operating a real estate property for a fee. The property may be individual title owned or owned under the sectional title, share block company owned, and may be registered for residential, commercial office, and retail or industrial use. In 2006, the Bureau of Labor Statistics Office of Occupational Statistics reported that there were 329,000 property managers employed in the United States, with the number expected to grow to by 50,000 by 2016.

== Overview of responsibilities ==
Typical duties expected of a property manager include finding/evicting, dealing with tenants, and coordinating with the owner's wishes. In addition, such arrangements may require the property manager to collect rents and pay necessary expenses and taxes, making periodic reports to the owner, or the owner may delegate specific tasks and deal with others directly.

A property manager may arrange for a wide variety of services, as may be requested by the owner of the property, for a fee. Where a dwelling (vacation home, second home) is only periodically occupied, the property manager might arrange for heightened security monitoring, house-sitting, storage and shipping of goods, and other local sub-contracting necessary to make the property comfortable when the owner is in residence (utilities, systems operating, supplies and staff on hand, etc.). Property management can also include commercial properties where the property manager may run the business and manage the property. Some jurisdictions may require a property manager to be licensed to practice the profession.

The property manager has a primary responsibility to the landlord and a secondary responsibility to the agency. The relationship the property manager has with the landlord and the tenant is crucial in forming the expectations of both parties to the lease since both parties will seek and expect certain rights and benefits.

== Professional designations ==
The Building Owners and Managers Association (BOMA International) offers industry-standard designations that certify the training to Property Managers:

- Real Property Administrator (RPA)
- Facilities Management Administrator (FMA)
- Systems Maintenance Administrator (SMA)
- Systems Maintenance Technician (SMT)

Institute of Real Estate Management (IREM)

- Certified Property Manager (CPM)
- Accredited Residential Manager (ARM)
- Accredited Commercial Manager (ACM)
- Accredited Management Organization (AMO)

Manufactured Housing Institute (MHI)

- Accredited Community Manager (ACM)
- Professional Housing Consultant (PHC)

National Apartment Association (NAA) has the following designations:

- Certified Apartment Manager (CAM)
- Certified Apartment Property Supervisor (CAPS)

National Association of Residential Property Managers offers designations to certify ethical and professional standards of conduct for property managers:

- Residential Management Professional (RMP)
- Master Property Manager (MPM)
- Certified Support Specialist (CSS)
- Certified Residential Management Company (CRMC)

National Center for Housing Management offers the following designations for property managers and others involved in housing management:

- Certified Manager of Housing (CMH)
- Certified Manager of Maintenance (CMM)
- Certified Occupancy Specialist (COS)
- Registered Housing Manager (RHM)
- Certified Financial Specialist (CFS)
- Tax Credit Specialist (TCS)
- Blended Occupancy Specialist (BOS)

State-specific designations:

- California - Certified Community Association Manager (CCAM)
- Florida - Community Association Manager (CAM)
- Minnesota - Certified Community Association Manager (CCAM) and Certified Residential Manager (CRM)

== See also ==
- Property management
