= International Property Measurement Standards =

- Abbreviation: IPMS
- Year started: 1 May 2013
- Organization: International Property Measurement Standards Coalition

International Property Measurement Standard (IPMS) is a standardised and globally applicable method for measuring property. It aims to address current inconsistencies in the way property of all types is measured from one market to the next, improving property market data and providing greater transparency.

== Background ==
IPMS standard is the collaborative effort of professional and nonprofit organisations from around the world. These organisations convened for the first time at a meeting hosted by the World Bank in Washington on 01-2 May 2013, each putting forward a representative to join the IPMS Board of Trustees.

Collectively, these organisations (otherwise referred to as the International Property Measurement Standards Coalition, or IPMSC) have agreed to create and implement a single, shared standard for measuring property. The first phase of the project was to develop an international standard for measuring offices "IPMS for Offices" which was to be published in June 2014.

A Standards Setting Committee of 19 independent experts has been tasked with drafting the standard on behalf of the Coalition.

== Membership ==
On 1 May 2014, the IPMS Coalition comprised the following 39 organisations:

- American Society of Farm Managers and Rural Appraisers (ASFMRA)
- Appraisal Institute (AI)
- Asia Pacific Real Estate Association(APREA)
- Asian Association for Investors in Non-listed Real Estate Vehicles (ANREV)
- Asociación de Promotores Constructores de España (APCE)
- Asociación Española de Análisis de Valor (AEV)
- Asociación Professional de Sociedades de Valoración (ATASA)
- ASTM International
- Australian Property Institute (API)
- British Property Federation (BPF)
- Building Owners and Managers Association International (BOMA International)
- China Institute of Real Estate Appraisers and Agents (CIREA)
- Commonwealth Association of Surveying and Land Economy (CASLE)
- CoreNet Global
- Council of European Geodetic Surveyors (CLGE)
- Counselors of Real Estate (CRE)
- European Association for Investors in Non-Listed Real Estate Vehicles INREV
- European Council of Real Estate Professions (CEPI)
- Gesellschaft für Immobilienwirtschaftliche Forschung e. V. (GIF)
- HypZert GmbH
- International Association of Assessing Officers (IAAO)
- International Consortium of Real Estate Associations (ICREA)
- International Federation of Surveyors (FIG)
- International Monetary Fund (IMF)
- International Real Estate Federation (FIABCI)
- International Union of Property Owners (UIPI)
- Italian Real Estate Industry Association (ASSOIMMOBILIARE)
- Japan Association of Real Estate Appraisers (JAREA)
- Japan Association of Real Estate Counselors (JAREC)
- National Society of Professional Surveyors (NSPS)
- NP “Cadastral engineers”
- Open Standards Consortium for Real Estate (OSCRE)
- Property Council of Australia (PCA)
- Property Council of New Zealand (PCNZ)
- Royal Institution of Chartered Surveyors (RICS)
- Seocovi SP (SECOVI)
- Society of Chartered Surveyors of Ireland (SCSI)
- South African Property Owners Association (SAPOA)
- The Appraisal Foundation (TAF)

The IPMS Coalition website www.ipmsc.org was launched in September 2013. As of 2017 there are more than 80 professional and not-for-profit organisations from around the world working as members of the IPMS Coalition.

== See also ==
- Real Property Administrator
