= Nathan Phillip Dodge Jr. =

Nathan Phillips Dodge Jr. (1872–1950) was an early real estate magnate in Omaha, Nebraska, responsible for developing more than 100 subdivisions across the United States.

== Early life ==
The son of a pioneer family in Nebraska's Douglas County Nathan graduated from public schools in Council Bluffs, Iowa before attending Williston Seminary in East Hampton, Massachusetts, from 1887 until 1889. In 1899, he started attending the Phillips Exeter Academy in Exeter, New Hampshire, until 1891. Earning a bachelor's degree at Harvard University from 1891 to 1894, he attended the Harvard Law School from 1894 until 1897.

== Business career ==
Dodge practiced law for three years in Boston, Massachusetts before he came back to Council Bluffs to lead his family's business. As the leader of the city's longtime N.P. Dodge Company, in 1900 Dodge Jr. was responsible from moving the company from Council Bluffs across the river to Omaha. At the time of his death the company had developed more than 200 subdivisions in 103 cities throughout the United States. Additionally, he was also a director of the Council Bluffs Savings Bank.

== Community life ==
Dodge was a member of the Nebraska Legislature from 1905 to 1907 and 1909 to 1911, and was a member of the Metropolitan Utilities District board of directors. Dodge Jr. established the West Lawn Cemetery and the Hillcrest Memorial Park in Omaha, as well as the Cedar Lawn Cemetery and the Walnut Hill Cemetery, both in Council Bluffs. He was president of West Lawn and Walnut Hill.

In 1930, Dodge Jr. donated 180 acres of Missouri River Valley bottomland to the City of Omaha, which named it Dodge Park in his honor. He also made significant contributions to the Children's Memorial Hospital, Masonic Home for Boys, Joslyn Art Museum, and Dodge Memorial Church in Council Bluffs.

== Family ==
Dodge Jr. married Laura C. Whitney in Brookline, Massachusetts in 1907, and the couple had three children. He was a nephew of Grenville M. Dodge and is the great grandfather of Nathan Phillip Dodge IV.

== Death ==
A resident of the Florence neighborhood of Omaha from 1947 to 1950, he died at home at the age of 78 and his funeral was at First Unitarian Church in Omaha. He was buried in a large family plot in one of the cemeteries where he was president, Walnut Hill in Council Bluffs.

== See also ==
- Economy of Omaha, Nebraska
