= Nathan Phillip Dodge IV =

Businessman and philanthropist in Omaha, Nebraska

Nathan Phillip Dodge IV, also known as Sandy, (born 1937) is a businessman and philanthropist in Omaha, Nebraska. He is the president and chairman of the NP Dodge Company.

== Biography ==
Born in Omaha, Dodge graduated from Harvard University and served as a first lieutenant in the United States Air Force from 1959 to 1962.

== Career ==
Dodge became the fourth Nathan Phillips Dodge to lead the family-owned company in 1978. He expanded the company to offer property management, title insurance, and corporate relocation services.

He previously served as Director and currently serves as Treasurer of Omaha Public Power District Board of Directors, winning his first board election in 1994. Dodge has held past directorships with various organizations, including the American States Water Company, Bridges Investment Counsel, Physicians Clinic, Omaha Community Playhouse Foundation, and Omaha Police Foundation. Dodge was also past Chairman of the University of Nebraska Medical Center Advisory Board and the Nebraska Economic Development Commission. He has been a member of the Nebraska Power Review Board and Mayor's Crime Commission, Girls Inc., and the Firstar Bank of Council Bluffs. He is a Past President of the Omaha Institute of Real Estate Management and the Greater Omaha Chamber of Commerce.
