= NP Dodge Company =

American real estate company

Coordinates: 41°15′44″N 96°02′55″W

- Type: Private
- Industry: Real estate Insurance
- Founded: 1855; 171 years ago, in Council Bluffs, Iowa
- Headquarters: Omaha, Nebraska
- Key people: Nate Dodge (president)
- Number of employees: 1263 (2020)
- Website: npdodge.com

The NP Dodge Company is based in Omaha, Nebraska. Established in 1855 as a small land office in Council Bluffs, Iowa. NP Dodge Company is the oldest real estate firm in the United States.

== About ==
Subsidiaries of the NP Dodge company include NP Dodge Residential Sales and Land Development. Other areas of the company include NEI Global Relocation, Property Management, NAI NP Dodge, NP Dodge Condo Sales, NP Dodge Title Services, and NP Dodge Builder Services, which hosted the Metro Omaha Builders Association 2007 Street of Dreams. The company sponsors a charitable program called Dodge Cares, and is a partner in the Rebuilding Together Omaha effort.

== Company and family history ==
Brothers Nathan Phillips and Grenville Mellen Dodge started the Dodge Company in 1855. While working as a land surveyor for the railroads in the Missouri River Valley, Grenville wrote to his younger brother Nathan Phillips (1837–1911) and told him to "forget high school" and come join him. N.P. worked his way out on a surveying crew in 1853 and together the brothers started a small land sales office based in Council Bluffs, Iowa, representing eastern investors. They also started a small bank. Grenville then began to focus on railroad building and politics, leaving the business management to his brother, N.P.

Nathan Phillips Dodge II (1872–1950) joined NP Dodge Company in the early 20th century. His plan was to offer lots as his father did, making it affordable for the everyday person to purchase their own lot of land for $1 down and $1 per week. This land development brought the NP Dodge Company to a nationwide status with more than 200 subdivisions in 103 cities.

N.P. Dodge III (1910–2004), called "Phil," took over the NP Dodge Company in 1950. Eventually, NP Dodge refocused on the Omaha area. Phil expanded the company offerings to include residential sales and construction, insurance, and mortgage lending. Phil was also a member of the Nebraska Legislature, Metropolitan Utilities District Board, and Omaha City Council.

N.P. Dodge IV (1937-2026), called "Sandy," has taken up the work of his father, maintaining NP Dodge as the oldest real estate firm still operated by its founding family. Sandy expanded the company to offer property management, title, and corporate relocation services. Sandy has also worked to promote business growth in the Omaha area. He served as director of the Bridges Investment Council, treasurer of the Omaha Public Power District board of directors and director of the American States Water Company. Sandy is also a member of the board of trustees for Physicians Clinic, Inc, director of the Omaha Community Playhouse Foundation, and commissioner of the Nebraska Economic Development Commission. Additionally, Sandy is a past president of the Omaha Institute of Real Estate Management, past president of the Greater Omaha Chamber of Commerce, and a past chairman of the University of Nebraska Medical Center board of counselors. He is also a member of the Omaha Police Foundation Board.

N.P. Dodge V, or "Nate," is the 5th generation of the Dodge family. Nate earned his BA at Tufts University and went on to work for several federal mortgage and housing divisions. He later developed loan packages while employed at Fannie Mae. Nate eventually followed in the footsteps of his family and became president of the NP Dodge Management Company and NP Dodge Title Services. Following his family's dedication to real estate development, Nate is a past officer for the Institute of Real Estate Management. He is currently a member of the Offutt Advisory Council, a member of the board of directors for the Ak-Sar-Ben River City Roundup, councillor for the Knights of Ak-Sar-Ben, a member of the Young Presidents' Organization, and a member of the board of directors for the First State Bank of Loomis. Nate is also a member of the board of directors for Lauritzen Corp, the New Community Development Corporation, and the Omaha Chamber of Commerce. In 2001, Nate received the Distinguished Services Award from the Omaha Chapter of the Nebraska Jaycees.

== See also ==
- Dodge House
- Dodge Park
