= Mobile Home Construction and Safety Standards Act of 1974 =

United States federal law

- Other short titles: Housing and Community Development Act of 1974
- Long title: An Act to provide for the establishment of construction and safety standards for mobile homes, and for other purposes.
- Acronyms (colloquial): MHCSSA, NMHCSSA
- Nicknames: National Mobile Home Construction and Safety Standards Act
- Enacted by: the 93rd United States Congress
- Effective: August 22, 1974

Citations
- Public law: 93-383
- Statutes at Large: 88 Stat. 633-2 aka 88 Stat. 700

Codification
- Titles amended: 42 U.S.C.: Public Health and Social Welfare
- U.S.C. sections created: 42 U.S.C. ch. 70 § 5401 et seq.

Legislative history
- Introduced in the Senate as S. 2538 by William Proxmire (D–WI) on October 4, 1973; Committee consideration by Senate Banking, Housing, and Urban Affairs, House Banking and Currency; Passed the Senate on March 11, 1974 (76-11, in lieu of S. 3066); Passed the House on June 20, 1974 (351-25, in lieu of H.R. 15361); Reported by the joint conference committee on August 12, 1974; agreed to by the Senate on August 13, 1974 (84-0, in lieu of S. 3066) and by the House on August 15, 1974 (377-21, in lieu of S. 3066); Signed into law by President Gerald R. Ford on August 22, 1974

Mobile Home Construction and Safety Standards Act of 1974 or National Mobile Home Construction and Safety Standards Act is a United States federal law establishing design and development safety standards for manufactured housing or prefabricated homes. The codified law authorized stipulations whereas any proposed safety standard shall be equitable for a particular type of mobile home with consideration of additional cost liabilities for the future homeownership. The Act of Congress endorsed violative civil penalties and judicial review of Federal mobile home construction and safety standards developed by the United States Department of Housing and Urban Development. The Act mandated the establishment of the National Mobile Home Advisory Council and National Mobile Home Administration.

The S. 2538 legislation appended the Housing and Community Development Act of 1974 on February 27, 1974. The Housing and Community Development Act of 1974 was a significant congressional amendment to the Housing Act of 1937. The United States housing authorization bill was passed by the United States 93rd Congressional session and enacted into law by the 38th President of the United States Gerald Ford on August 22, 1974.

== Amendments to 1974 Act ==
Congressional amendments to the Mobile Home Construction and Safety Standards Act.

Date of Enactment	Public Law Number	U.S. Statute Citation	U.S. Legislative Bill	U.S. Presidential Administration
October 8, 1980	P.L. 96-399	94 Stat. 1614	S. 2719	Jimmy E. Carter
December 27, 2000	P.L. 106-569	114 Stat. 2944	H.R. 5640	William J. Clinton

== See also ==
- Construction trailer
- Manufactured Housing Institute
- Modular home
- Travel Trailer
- Truck camper
