= Nicole Metje =

Nicole Metje PhD, MCInstCES, MASCE, FHEA is professor of infrastructure monitoring, head of the Power and Infrastructure Research Group, and deputy director for sensors of the UKCRIC National Buried Infrastructure Facility at the University of Birmingham. She plays a significant role in the development and application of sensors for buried infrastructure assessment and monitoring.

== Education ==
Metje studied Civil Engineering at Leibniz University Hannover, graduating in 1998. She studied for her PhD at the University of Birmingham graduating in 2001. Metje's thesis was titled "Sediment suspension under water waves".

== Research and career ==
Metje joined the School of Electrical, Electronic and Computer Engineering at the University of Birmingham as a research fellow in 2001. Six months later she moved to the School of Civil Engineering as a senior research fellow to research optical fibre sensing technologies to determine the deformations of tunnels. Metje was appointed as the senior postdoctoral research fellow in 2005 to work on a network funded research grant entitled Mapping the Underworld (MTU), which aimed to locate and record all buried utility assets without excavation. In 2007, Metje was awarded a Birmingham Research Fellowship, which transferred into a lectureship in geotechnical engineering in 2010.

Metje leads a work package for the University of Birmingham led Quantum Technologies (QT) Hub for Sensors and Metrology, which is part of the UK National Quantum Technologies Programme (UKNQTP) . The work package focuses on the application of QT gravity sensors for civil engineering problems such as buried pipes, capped mine shafts and sinkholes. She also works with industry on five Innovate UK funded projects to accelerate the development of QT gravity gradiometers.

Metje has over 40 published journal papers, and 40 refereed conference papers in the field of coastal engineering, geotechnical engineering, infrastructure monitoring and sensor development. She is the co-author of a book introducing tunnel construction to engineering students.

Metje sits on a number of advisory boards including the Institution of Civil Engineers Municipal Expert and Geospatial Engineering Panels, the American Society of Civil Engineers utility standards committee, the US Transportation Research Board committee on utilities, the All Party Parliamentary Water Group, and the British Standards Institute PAS128 & PAS256 steering committees for utility detection and data sharing. Metje has also been involved in discussions about the refurbishment of Birmingham's Queensway and St Chad's tunnels.

== Awards and honours ==
Metje became a Fellow of the Higher Education Academy in 2009. Metje became a Member of the Chartered Institution of Civil Engineering Surveyors and Member of the American Society of Civil Engineers in 2015. In 2018, Metje won the Institution of Civil Engineers West Midlands Studies and Research Award for the FINDIT: Finding Infrastructure with Non-Destructive Testing project. The project created a sub-surface mapping system locating buried services accurately and indicating their condition. In 2019, Metje again won the Institution of Civil Engineers West Midlands Studies and Research Award for the Quantum Technology – Potential for Railway Applications project, which uses non-intrusive technology to help minimise disruption to railway passengers and improve maintenance efficiency.
