= Deborah Levy (academic) =

New Zealand business academic specialising in property and real estate

Deborah Susan Levy
- Education: University of Auckland
- Scientific career
- Workplaces: University of Auckland
- Thesis: Conceptualising the influence of clients on valuations (2005)

Deborah Susan Levy is a New Zealand business academic specialising in property and real estate.

== Academic career ==
After an undergraduate at the University of Aberdeen, Levy wrote a PhD thesis Conceptualising the influence of clients on valuations at the University of Auckland. She has been a full professor at that institution in 2015.

Levy is a Fellow of the Royal Institution of Chartered Surveyors (FRICS) and was given a lifetime achievement award in 2017.

== Selected works ==
- Levy, Deborah S., and Christina Kwai-Choi Lee. "The influence of family members on housing purchase decisions." Journal of Property Investment & Finance
- Levy, Deborah S. "Modern marketing research techniques and the property professional." Property management (journal) 13, no. 3 (1995): 33–40.
