= Corporate real estate =

Corporate real estate is the real property held or used by a business enterprise or organization for its own operational purposes. A corporate real estate portfolio typically includes a corporate headquarters and a number of branch offices, and perhaps also various manufacturing and retail sites. Corporate real estate may also refer to the functional practice, department, or profession involved in the planning, acquisition, design, construction or fit-out, management, and administration of real property for a company.

== Corporate real estate professionals ==
Typically, corporate real estate professionals approach the market from an owner-occupant perspective—whether leasing or buying—primarily from the demand side, similar to corporate purchasing or procurement. They aim to control costs and can benefit from economic environments considered "weak".

Although related to facilities and property management, corporate real estate typically has a broader corporate scope but a narrower focus within the real estate sector. For instance, corporate real estate professionals (or departments) typically dedicate greater emphasis and time on multi-site long-range planning (often called "portfolio planning" or "strategic planning"). The focus is almost exclusively on commercial property types (mostly office, sometimes industrial or retail). Inclusion of residential properties in corporate portfolios is rare.

== See also ==
- Commercial real estate
- Real Property
- Real estate
- Facilities Management
- Property Management
- CAFM
- Building Automation
- Lease Administration
