= International Journal of Remote Sensing =

- Discipline: Geography
- Language: English
- Edited by: Timothy A. Warner, Arthur P. Cracknell

Publication details
- History: 1980–present
- Publisher: Taylor & Francis
- Frequency: Semimonthly
- Impact factor: 3.151 (2020)

Standard abbreviations
- ISO 4: Int. J. Remote Sens.

Indexing
- CODEN: IJSEDK
- ISSN: 0143-1161
- LCCN: 81649524

Links
- Journal homepage; Online access; Online archive

The International Journal of Remote Sensing is a semimonthly peer-reviewed scientific journal covering research on remote sensing. It was established in 1980 and is published by Taylor & Francis on behalf of the Remote Sensing and Photogrammetry Society, of which it is the official journal. The journal Remote Sensing Reviews, which was established in 1983, was incorporated into the International Journal of Remote Sensing in 2001. The editors-in-chief are Timothy A. Warner (West Virginia University) and Arthur P. Cracknell (University of Dundee). According to the Journal Citation Reports, the journal has a 2020 impact factor of 3.151.
