= National Apartment Association =

Non-profit trade association in the United States

The National Apartment Association (NAA) is a non-profit trade association in the United States of apartment communities, owners and vendors. These member companies are also part of NAA with their membership at the local level. Members represent the various facets of the multifamily housing industry: apartment owners, management executives, developers, builders, investors, property managers, leasing consultants, maintenance personnel, vendors and related business professionals throughout the United States and Canada. NAA has its headquarters in Arlington, VA. Robert Pinnegar currently serves as the organization's president and chief executive officer.

NAA lobbies for policies that benefit owners and operators.

NAA also publishes a trade magazine, UNITS.

== National Apartment Association Education Institute (NAAEI) ==
That National Apartment Association also provides education courses and certifications for professionals in the apartment industry. The National Apartment Association Education Institute (NAAEI) offers these courses. NAAEI is the education arm of NAA. Its mission is to provide broad-based education, training and recruitment programs that attract, nurture and retain high-quality professionals and develop tomorrow's apartment industry leaders.

- Certified Apartment Manager (CAM): Course training covers management of residential issues, legal responsibilities, human resource management, fair housing, marketing, property maintenance for managers, risk management and fiscal management.
- Certified Apartment Portfolio Supervisor (CAPS): An in-depth review of property management principles and techniques as used by the professional supervisor.
- Certificate for Apartment Maintenance Technicians (CAMT): An introduction for new maintenance professionals or as a refresher for the veteran employee, to give these professionals the knowledge and tools necessary to run an effective maintenance program.
- Independent Rental Owner Professional Designation Course (IROP): A course offered to the rental owner who manages their personally-held multifamily property or properties. The independent rental owner serves several roles in property management, public relations specialist, administrator, chief financial officer, marketing director and operations manager.
- National Apartment Leasing Professional (NALP): A course offered to leasing professionals to improve critical skills in effective marketing strategy, qualifying prospective residents, closing sales, preparing and executing lease agreements, responding to resident issues and understanding the lease renewal process.

== Apartment Career Promotion ==
As part of NAAEI's mission to promote careers in the apartment industry, February is designated as annual National Apartment Careers Month. National Apartment Careers Month was created to bring awareness about career opportunities in the industry.

== Military Spouse and Veteran Outreach ==
NAAEI hosted the first ever Military Career fair in San Diego, CA on June 19, 2013. The career fair was for transitioning military and military spouses to meet with apartment industry employers, interview for jobs and learn more about apartment careers.

== Economic impact ==
In 2013, the National Apartment Association partnered with the National Multifamily Housing Council to release the first study, "The Trillion Dollar Industry" that quantifies the gross domestic product of the multifamily housing industry. This study found that apartment industry spending contributes $1.1 trillion to the national economy and supports 25.4 million jobs.
