= Joshua Major =

English landscape designer (1786–1866)

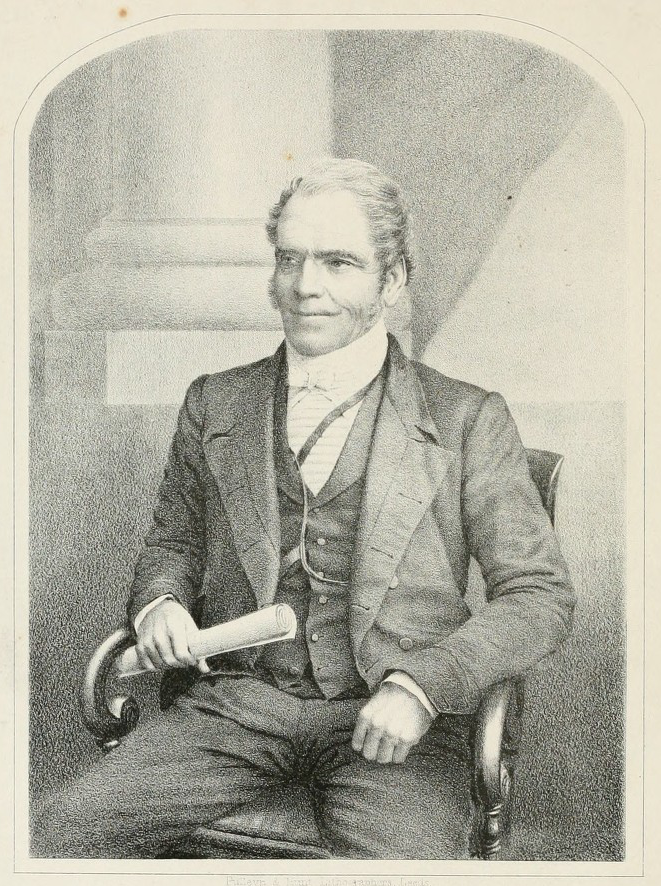
Joshua Major

Joshua Major (1786–1866) was an English landscape gardener and designer, born on 28 August 1786 in Owston, near Doncaster in the then West Riding of Yorkshire. His parents were Richard Major, an estate labourer, and Mary, née Bramma, and he was the youngest of their three children.

Major founded a nursery garden at Knowsthorpe in Leeds and won awards at flower shows. His son Henry became a partner in the firm which became involved in landscape design. His firm was commissioned to landscape Hanover Square in Leeds in 1824 and Oakes Park in Sheffield in 1834. He was also responsible for landscaping the grounds of Ben Rhydding Hydro in 1843–44, and Ilkley's Wells House Hydropathic Establishment in 1853.

Major entered a competition to design some of the earliest public parks. He won the commission to design Peel Park in Salford and Queens Park and Philips Park in Manchester. They were in densely populated areas and financed by public subscription. Parks designed by Major has areas for sport, recreation and walking.

Major wrote books on gardening and contributed to the Gardeners' Magazine. He was involved in the formation of the first Sunday school in Leeds. He died in Leeds at the age of 79 in January 1866.

== Works ==
- ...on fruit trees... (1829)
- The theory and practice of landscape gardening (1852)
