= CoreNet Global =

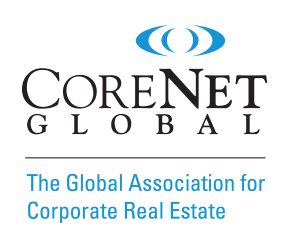
- Type: Non-profit organization
- Headquarters: Atlanta, Georgia United States
- Region served: Worldwide
- Fields: Real estate management
- Members: 9,552 (2015)
- Board of Directors Chair: Kate Langan
- CEO: Angela Cain
- Subsidiaries: 47 local chapters
- Revenue: ▲$13.663 million (2015)
- Expenses: ▲$12.914 million (2015)
- Staff: 51

CoreNet Global is an American non-profit corporate real estate association based in Atlanta, Georgia. It represents executives in 50 countries who manage the real estate assets of large corporations; its members include half of the Forbes Global 2000.

CoreNet Global holds conferences for networking and professional development, conducts surveys, and publishes research and real estate data for use by the media. The association is represented worldwide by 47 local chapters.

The association holds thrice-annual Summits, split between the North America, Asia/Pacific, and Europe/Middle East/Africa regions. North American Summits generally attract about 2,000 attendees, and in other locations about 500 attendees.

CoreNet Global publishes a magazine called the LEADER which reports on global real estate news.
