= Australian Property Institute =

Logo of the Australian Property Institute.

The Australian Property Institute (API) is a professional industry body representing residential, commercial and plant and machinery valuers, analysts, fund managers and property lawyers.

The API was originally formed in 1926 as the Commonwealth Institute of Valuers. Due to the protections provided by API members being covered by a Professional Standards Scheme, overseen by the Professional Standards Council, and the access that enables to full professional indemnity insurance, all major lenders require property professionals who carry out mortgage valuation work to be members of the API.

According to its 2024 Annual Report, API has 7,336 members of which over 5,000 are professional valuers.

The API provides certifications to its members reflecting their specific field of expertise. Such Certifications are required by some Australian States to practice in the specific field. These Certifications are:

- CPV, Certified Practising Valuer
- RPV, Residential Property Valuer
- CPP, Certified Property Professional
- CPM, Certified Property Manager
- CFM, Certified Funds Manager
- CPD, Certified Property Developer
- CFacM, Certified Facilities Manager
- CAM, Certified Asset Manager

API publications include the Rules of Professional Conduct and the API Code of Ethics

Members of the Institute are bound by a code of ethics, rules of conduct, and professional practice standards. The API has reciprocity agreements with the following bodies

- The Appraisal Institute (USA)
- Property Institute of New Zealand
- Appraisal Institute of Canada
- Hong Kong Institute of Surveyors (General Practice Division)
- Royal Institution of Chartered Surveyors, United Kingdom (General Practice Division)
- Singapore Institute of Surveyors and Valuers (General Practice Division)

These reciprocity agreements provide API members with portable skills and qualifications allowing them to practice throughout the world.

The National Office of the Australian Property Institute is located at Level 4, 66 Clarence Street, Sydney NSW 2000.
