= Lease administration =

Departments concerned with leases

Lease administration is a department that usually falls under an organization's real estate department. Lease administration involves receiving rents from facilities they own and paying rent for the facilities they lease, and other activities. It has become an integral part of the accounting, administrative, and legal requirements normally associated with a real estate portfolio. Job responsibilities for lease administrators and real estate professionals include: lease review and abstracting, accounting and processing, lease audits, CAM charges, lease renewal options, repairs and maintenance, information management and reporting, occupancy cost analysis, operating expense review, and document storage and maintenance.

Once a lease is in place, lease administrators continue to manage and monitor rental payments, coordinate any tenant alterations, and handle lease amendments when necessary.

Depending on a corporation's departmental structure, lease administration or lease management can make up just one department under the umbrella of a corporations real estate structure. Other departments may include facilities management, real estate accounting, construction, and property management.

Lease administration can be handled either internally or through outsourcing. The sizes of the organization's portfolio and the corresponding complexity of creating automated management and accounting systems are factors that influence an organization's decision to perform lease administration in house or to outsource the function.

== Lease Abstract ==
Lease management requires the extraction of key information from the lease agreement document into what is called a Lease Abstract, which is a summary of essential terms of a leasehold agreement of real estate.

A lease of real estate, regardless of the country or state of jurisdiction, fundamentally comprises clauses that define the commercial terms, legal terms and functional terms of the transaction.

A Lease Abstract is prepared upon the execution or commencement of the agreement to provide a more simplified, easier to use and shorter reference point for administering or managing the lease.

== Software ==
Tenant-oriented software for lease administration was available in the early 1980s.

Later developments in this industry led to the release of cloud software applications which provide a web-based platform and are usually priced on a subscription basis with minimal if any capital expense cost and monthly or annual fees.

More advanced lease administration software systems provide extensive bolt-on functionality such as charting, mapping, demographics, project management, contract management, asset management and business intelligence reporting.

Since 2010 the pending changes to the U.S. Financial Accounting Standards Board and International Financial Reporting Standards lease accounting standards that are proposed to treat real estate leases as capital and not operating leases has seen an increase in the take-up of software systems by both tenants and landlords.

== Organizations ==
- NRTA – National Real Estate Tenants Association.
- OSCRE - Open Standards Consortium for Real Estate...
