= Ben Rhydding Hydro =

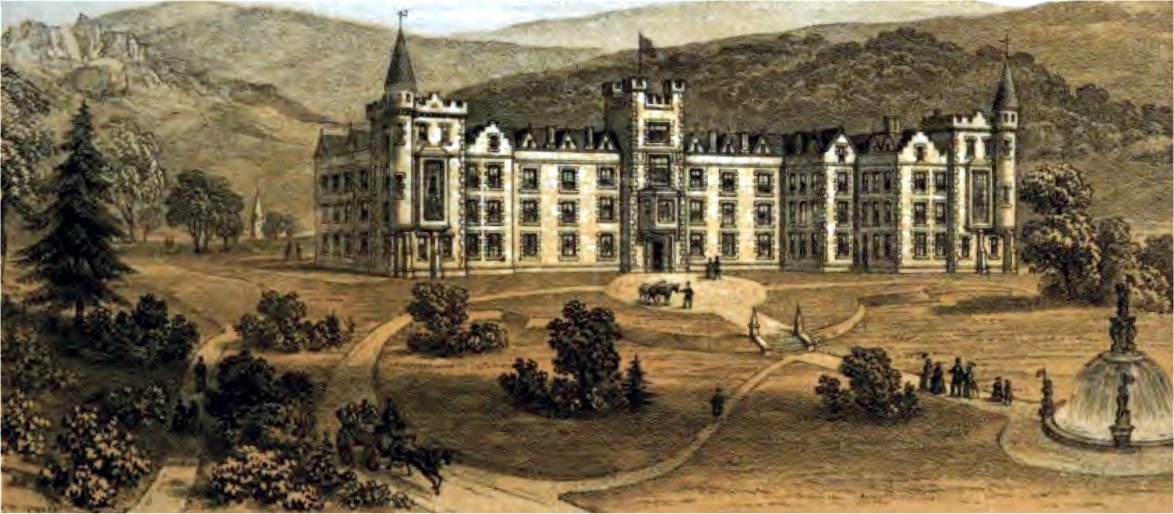
Ben Rhydding hydropathic establishment, c. 1858

Ben Rhydding Hydro, opened as the Wharfedale Hydropathic Establishment and Ben Rhydding Hotel and later rebranded as the Ben Rhydding Golf Hotel was a hotel in Ben Rhydding near Ilkley, West Yorkshire, England, opened in 1844 and demolished in 1955.

The hotel was designed around the principles of hydrotherapy or the cold water cure, a Victorian health regime which emerged in the early 1840s and which diminished in popularity by the early 20th century. Ben Rhydding was the third UK hydrotherapy hotel in the UK, and the first to be custom built; it gave its name to the settlement, Wheatley, in which it was established.

== History ==
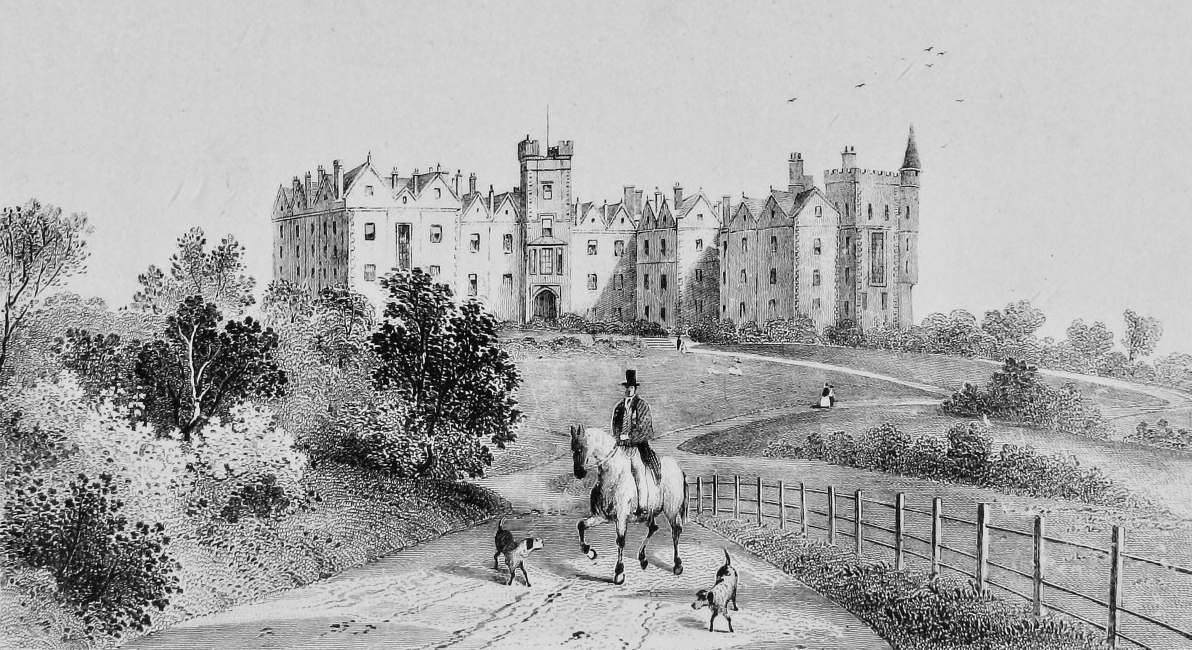
Ben Rhydding Hydro c. 1861

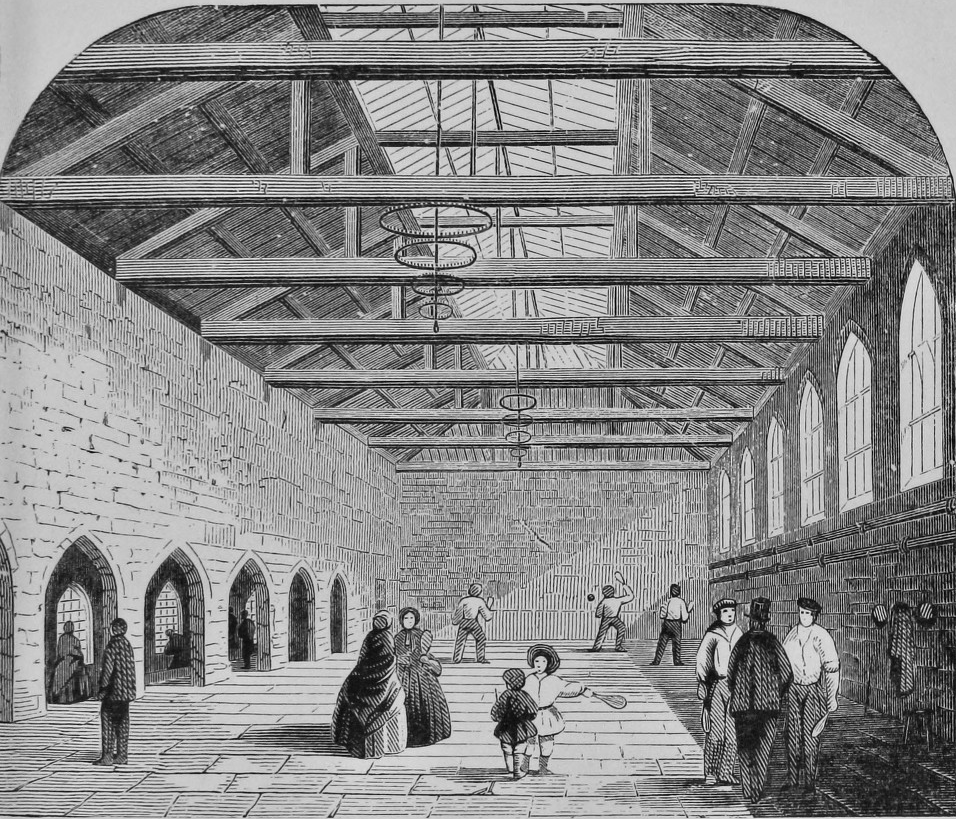
Racket Court at Ben Rhydding c. 1861

The Victorian history of hydrotherapy in the UK is traced back to Richard Tappin Claridge, an asphalt contractor and captain in the Middlesex Militia, who published and lectured in the early 1840s on an approach to the supposed curative properties of water developed by Vincenz Priessnitz in Gräfenberg (now Lázně Jeseník), Austrian Silesia. The basics of the cold water cure was the supposition that bad substances in the blood could be sweated out, by wrapping patients first in wet linen, and then in blankets, so as to open their pores.

The curative properties of water predate Victorian hydrotherapy, not least in Ilkley, which had had since the very early 18th-century an outdoor spa bath, White Wells, said to be a cure for 'bad eyes', 'tumours and sores', 'scrophula' and 'all cases where the spine is affected'.

Ben Rhydding Hydro was established in 1843 by a consortium led by Hamer Stansfeld, (Note: Stansfeld's name is often rendered as Stansfield) a Leeds merchant and then Mayor of Leeds, who had taken a – to his mind successful – water cure in Gräfenberg in that year. Stansfeld, his brother, a county court judge in Halifax, and two others, raised £30,000 to build a Scottish baronial architecture style hotel on high ground south of the River Wharfe, east of Ilkley, laying the foundation stone on 26 September 1843.

The hotel building, designed by Messers Sharp of Leeds and York, and built by Messers Russell and Wilkes, was of three-stories and c-shaped, having two residential wings, one each for male and female patients, and a central hotel section. It was sited in a 65 acres (26 ha) landscaped estate designed by Joshua Major. At its opening, the hotel was capable of accommodating 60 patients 'with their friends and attendants'. A formal opening dinner was held on 20 May 1844. (Note: 1844 or 1846? Although most sources, including contemporary newspapers, give the opening date of the Ben Rhydding Hydro as 1844, Robert Collyer, resident in Ilkley in the period in question, states in his history Ilkley: Ancient and Modern that "1843 – Hydropathy was introduced. Ben Rhydding, founded by Hamer Stansfeld, Esq., was erected in 1846, on land purchased from Mr. Bolling. Dr. Rischanek, a Silesian, was first physician. He lodged at Usher's before the opening of Ben Rhydding.")

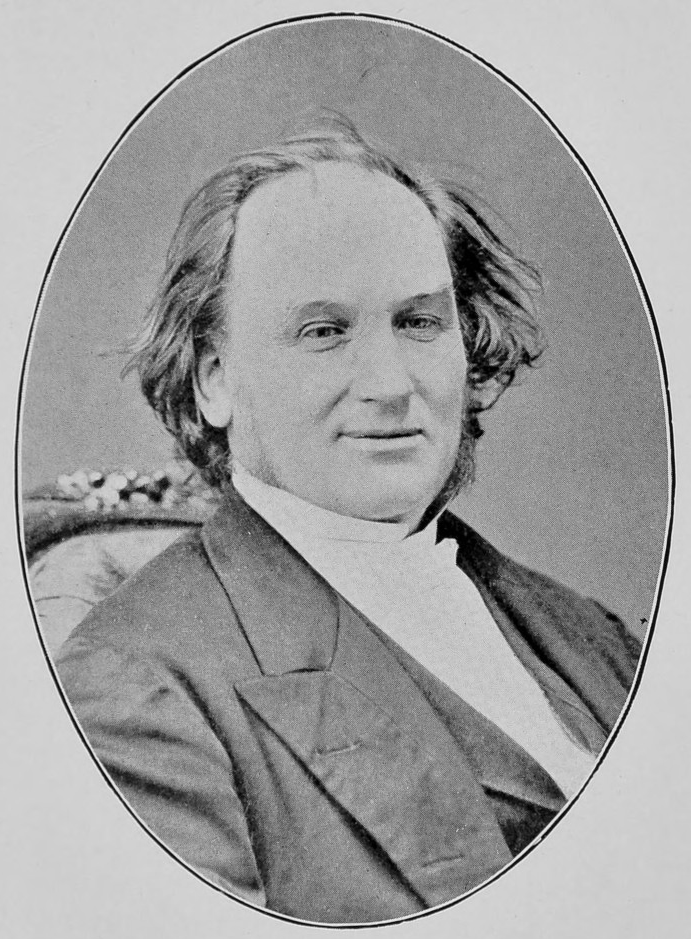
Dr William Macleod, resident physician from 1847 and afterwards owner of the Hydro

Stansfeld linked Ben Rhydding Hydro to Vincenz Priessnitz, inscribing a marble tank containing spring-fed drinking water, housed in an octagonal spa building in the grounds: (Note: Priessnitz marble tank: The tank in contemporary times has been resited to the Canker Well park on The Grove in Ilkley. 53.92473°N 1.82673°W)

In Memory of / VINCENT PRIESSNITZ, / The Silesian Peasant, to whom the world / Is indebted for the blessing of the / System of Cure by Water, / This fountain / Is gratefully erected and inscribed by / Hamer Stansfeld. / Ben Rhydding, May 29, 1844.

According to The Bradford Observer the opinion of railway speculators who met at the Hydro in 1844, was that although it was a first-rate facility, it would not pay. A November 1884 meeting of the proprietors of the Hydro board, however, claimed it was a complete success, and voted £10 to the mission of Father Mathew, a teetotalist reformer, and by a subscription of £150 to a Hydropathic Fever Hospital.

At its outset, the hotel was run by a Mr. Strachan, from the Midland Hotel in Derby. Its hydrotheraputic operation was led by a Dr. Rischanek, who had trained under Priessnitz at Grafenberg, and was considered an experienced hydropathist. Ben Rhydding dispensed with Rischanek's services in 1847, according to Metcalfe because "he was not adapted to the ways and habits of English people, and so did not get on with them very well. Moreover, he was lacking in the necessary energy for the conduct of so large an establishment". The company engaged in his stead a Dr. William Macleod (Note: Macleod's name is sometimes given as McLeod or MacLeod) from the Edinburgh medical establishment. On his appointment, MacLeod spent some time familiarising himself with hydrotherapy at Malvern under James Manby Gully and James Wilson.

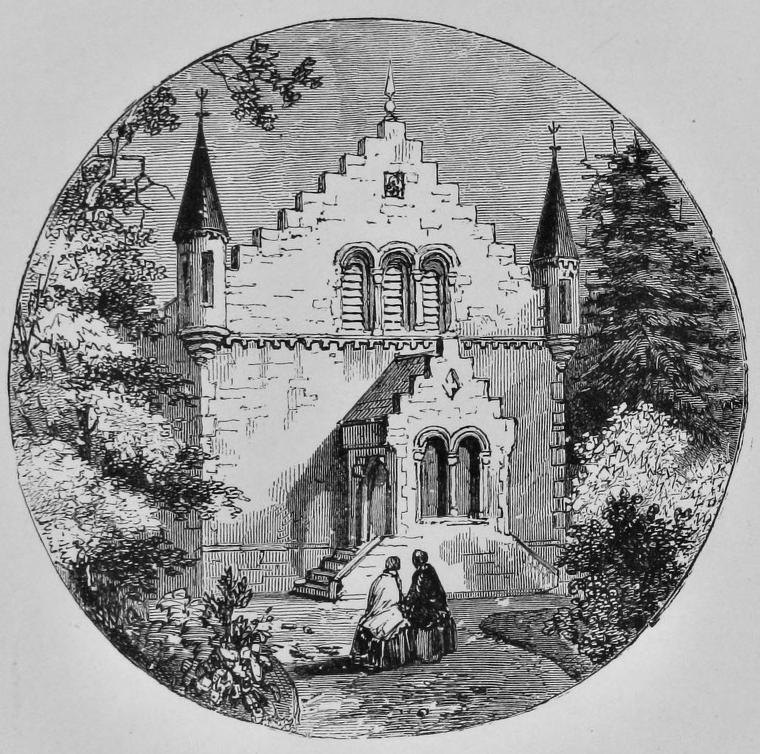
Roman or Turkish baths, exterior, c.1861

Hamer Stansfeld appears to have withdrawn from public life in the late 1850s, and died in 1865. At some time after his appointment, Macleod obtained a lease from the company running Ben Rhydding, giving him sole control over the establishment for fifteen years, at the expiration of which term he purchased the property, becoming proprietor of Ben Rhydding Hydro business. He added three new wings to the main building, as well as making other improvements in the grounds. (Note: Macleod ownership: Ilkley Civic Society, reported in the Ilkley Gazette, suggest that Macleod acquired the Hydro in the late 1850s.)

Macleod introduced Victorian Turkish baths at Ben Rhydding in 1859, barely three years after the first such baths had been built by Dr Richard Barter at his St Ann'e Hydropathic Establishment near Blarney, Co. Cork, Ireland. Like Barter, Macleod chose to house the Turkish baths in a separate building. This was designed in a Scottish baronial style by architects Lockwood and Mawson. (Note: These important baths were the first to be designed by an established firm of professional architects, their experience here uniquely preparing them for those they later designed at Saltaire and Keighley.) The baths comprised frigidarium, tepidarium, and caldarium, ranging in temperatures from 100°F–150°F. All had encaustic tiled floors and were well furnished with wood panel enclosed dressing cubicles in the frigidarium, curtained cubicles with couches for reclining in the tepidarium, and covered benches and a central shampooing table in the caldarium.

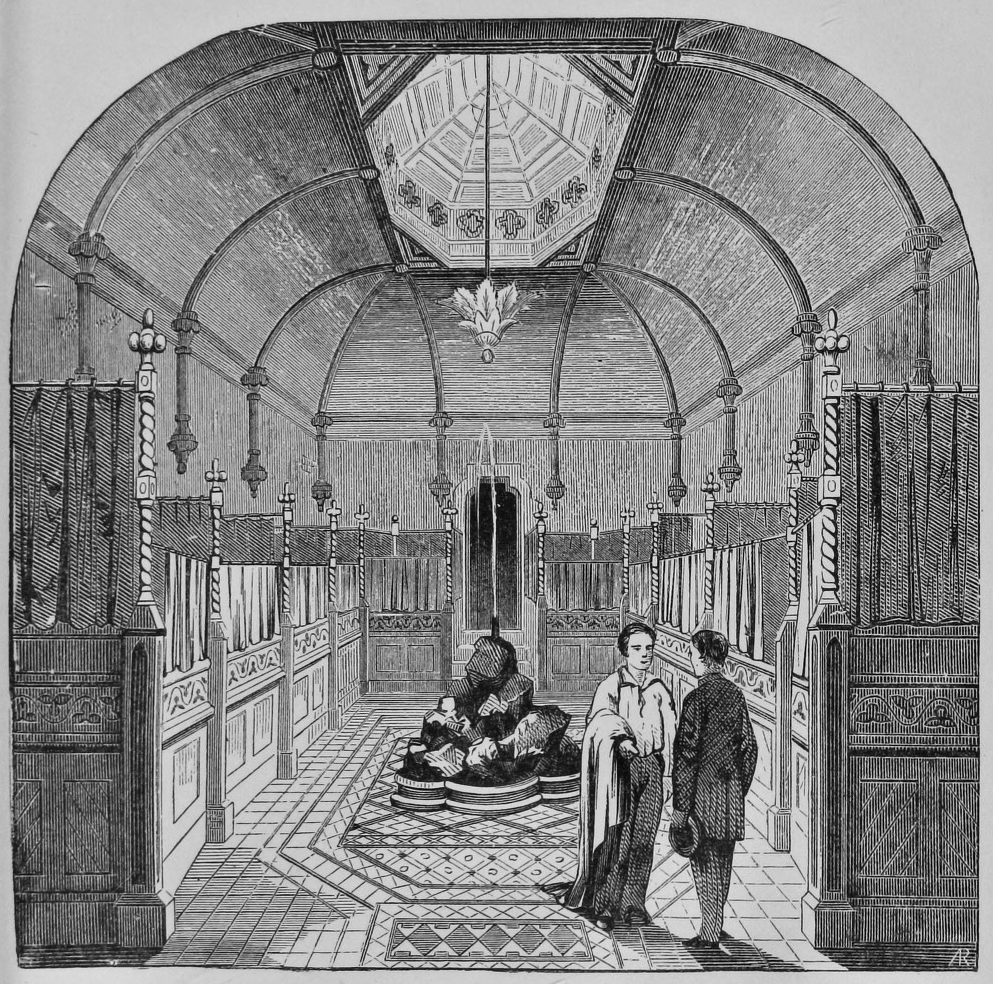
Roman or Turkish baths, interior, c.1861

The Otley and Ilkley Joint Railway was opened on 1 August 1865, providing train connections between Ilkley and Leeds. A wooden-platform station complete with wooden booking office, waiting room and retiring room for ladies was added at Ben Rhydding, opening on 1 July 1866. In May 1871, William MacLeod reached agreement with the Otley and Ilkley Joint Committee responsible for the railway, to erect at his expense a stone-built waiting room and office serving his clientele. The hydro now met customers from Ben Rhydding station, transporting them to the hydro by horse-drawn omnibus. (The railway company assumed ownership of the buildings in 1885.)

Although Macleod is widely praised in writings about hydrotherapy, he is serially criticised for permitting the introduction of alcohol to the Ben Rhydding regime. Hydrotherapy and temperance were seen by contemporary commentators as twins, and Macleod's deviation from this orthodoxy was met with quite severe opprobrium and the loss of some customers, such as Quakers.

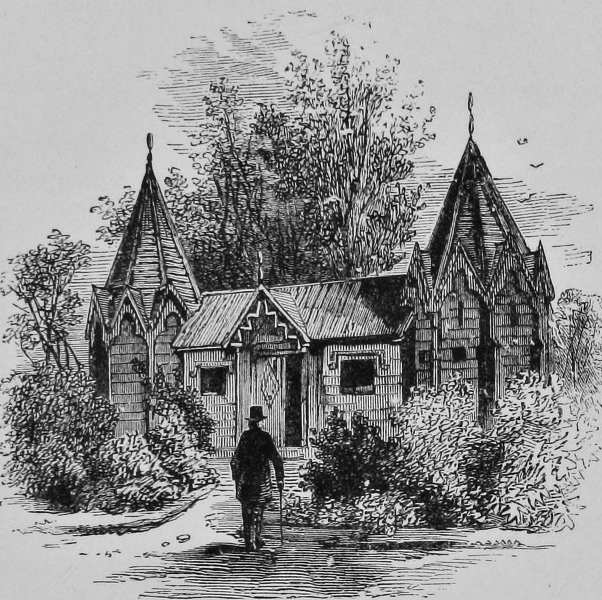
The Compressed Air Bath facility at ben Rhydding, c.1861

The success of Ben Rhydding hydro led to the development of a number of other Hydro establishments in Ilkley, notably Wells House, Craiglands and Troutbeck. It was also the impetus for a residential building boom in Ben Rhydding. The Bradford Observer notes that William Macleod "may be said to be the person who developed the practice of hydropathic treatment to its present standing; and he very largely contributed to making Ilkley what it is in this respect."

Macleod interests in the hydro were sold to a company; Metcalfe states this occurred before Macleod's death on 29 January 1875 at the age of 56, but advertisements in the contemporary press suggest it may have occurred after his death. Metcalfe names a number of successor physicians at Ben Rhydding – Drs Lucy, Little, Johnstone and Scott – whilst noting that "none of these made a success of the place like Dr. Macleod".

The Hydro added a nine-hole golf course by 1909, and after World War I advertised itself as the Ben Rhydding Golf Hotel. The hotel building was requisitioned by the government at the start of World War II, used as offices for the Wool Control Board. On its release in 1948, it was not reinstated as a hotel, but stood empty. The building was demolished in 1955.

== Notes ==
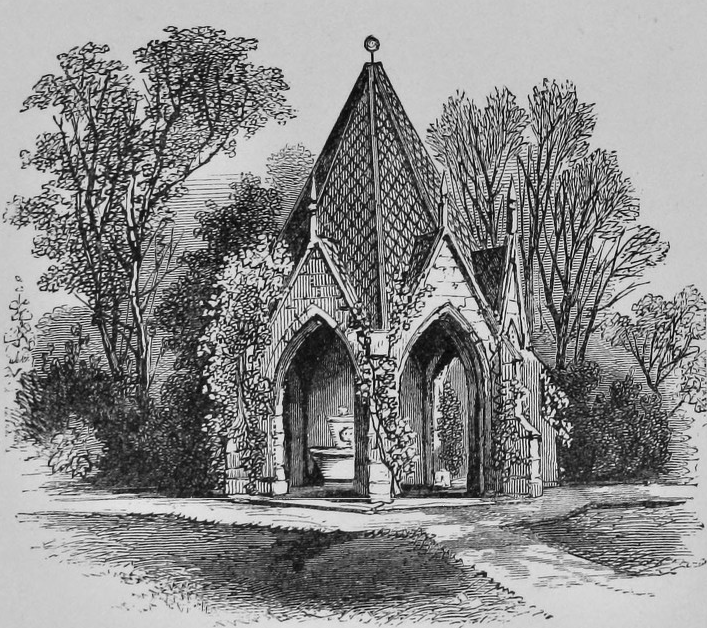
The Shrine at Ben Rhydding – outdoor spa water source, c. 1861
