= Remote Sensing and Photogrammetry Society =

British learned society

- Abbreviation: RSPSoc
- Formation: 1952
- Type: NGO
- Affiliations: International Society for Photogrammetry and Remote Sensing
- Website: www.rspsoc.org.uk

The Remote Sensing and Photogrammetry Society (RSPSoc) is a British learned society devoted to photogrammetry and remote sensing. It is the UK's adhering body of the International Society for Photogrammetry and Remote Sensing.

RSPSoc resulted from a merger, in 2001, of the Photogrammetry Society (PSoc) founded in 1952 and the Remote Sensing Society (RSS) founded in 1974.

RSPSoc publishes the International Journal of Remote Sensing, Remote Sensing Letters, and The Photogrammetric Record (all with JCR impact factors).

== See also ==
- American Society for Photogrammetry and Remote Sensing
- British Cartographic Society
- Chartered Institution of Civil Engineering Surveyors
- Royal Institution of Chartered Surveyors
