= Certified Property Manager =

Certified Property Manager (CPM) is a real estate professional designation awarded by the Institute of Real Estate Management (IREM) and recognized by the National Association of Realtors (NAR).

IREM offers a program designed for property and asset managers handling portfolios of various sizes and types. The CPM designation is considered one of the leading credentials in the field. Over 8,600 professionals worldwide hold the CPM title, managing about $900 billion in real estate assets.

To earn the designation, candidates must join IREM (about $500 annually), enroll in their local chapter, and pay a candidate fee.

To achieve the CPM designation, a candidate must complete about ten IREM courses on topics such as marketing, human resources, asset management, and ethics. They must also submit a management plan on a subject building, pass a 150-question exam, and meet experience requirements. Courses are available in classrooms, online, or via home study.

== See also ==
- Real estate professional designations
