= Floor area =

Amount of area taken up by a building or part of it

In architecture, construction, and real estate, floor area, floor space, or floorspace is the area (measured in square metres or square feet) taken up by a building or part of it. The ways of defining "floor area" depend on what factors of the building should or should not be included, such as external walls, internal walls, corridors, lift shafts, stairs, etc. Generally there are three major differences in measuring floor area.

- Gross floor area (GFA) - The total floor area contained within the building measured to the external face of the external walls.
- Gross internal area (GIA) - The floor area contained within the building measured to the internal face of the external walls.
- Net internal area (NIA) (or Net floor area NFA, or Usable floor area UFA) - The NIA is the GIA less the floor areas taken up by lobbies, enclosed machinery rooms on the roof, stairs and escalators, mechanical and electrical services, lifts, columns, toilet areas (other than in domestic property), ducts, and risers.

== Gross floor area ==
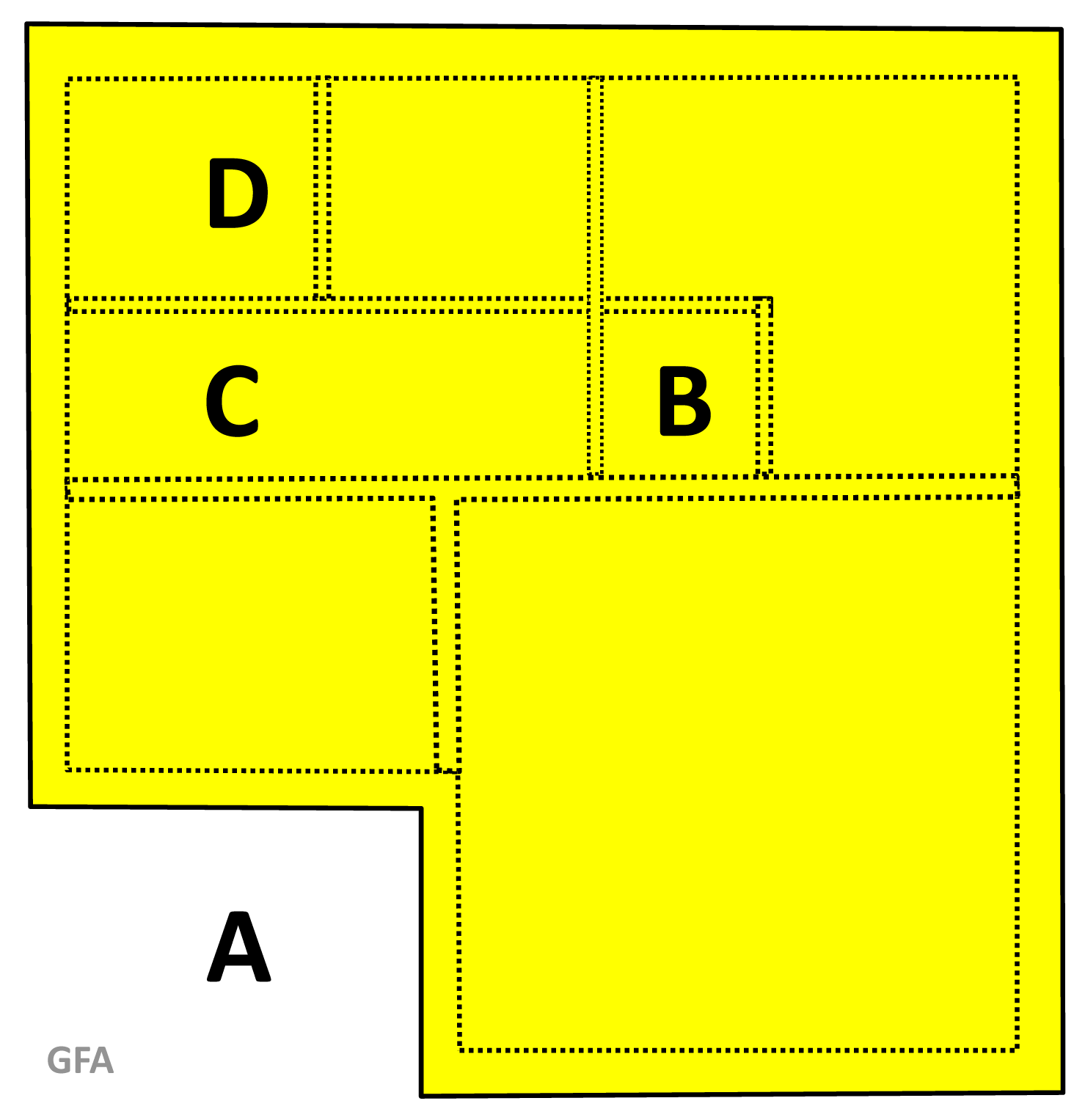
Measuring gross floor area (GFA)

Gross floor area (GFA) in real estate is the total floor area inside the building envelope, including the external walls, and excluding the roof.

Definitions of GFA, including which areas are to be counted towards it and which areas aren't, vary around the world. Adding to this confusion is the practice among some developers to use gross leasable area (GLA) and GFA interchangeably, or to use GFA as GLA, even though GLA usually excludes corridors and other public areas inside the development, while both figures include areas occupied by structure, like walls and columns.

=== In Hong Kong ===
Hong Kong law Chapter 123F, Building (Planning) Regulations, Regulation 23 sect 3 sub-paragraph (a) defined that:

Subject to sub-paragraph (b), for the purposes of regulations 19, 20, 21 and 22, the gross floor area of a building shall be the area contained within the external walls of the building measured at each floor level (including any floor below the level of the ground), together with the area of each balcony in the building, which shall be calculated from the overall dimensions of the balcony (including the thickness of the sides thereof), and the thickness of the external walls of the building.

sub-paragraph (b):

In determining the gross floor area for the purposes of regulations 20, 21 and 22, the Building Authority may disregard any floor space that he is satisfied is constructed or intended to be used solely for parking motor vehicles, loading or unloading of motor vehicles, or for refuse storage chambers, refuse storage and material recovery chambers, material recovery chambers, refuse storage and material recovery rooms, refuse chutes, refuse hopper rooms and other types of facilities provided to facilitate the separation of refuse to the satisfaction of the Building Authority, or for access facilities for telecommunications and broadcasting services, or occupied solely by machinery or equipment for any lift, air-conditioning or heating system or any similar service. (L.N. 406 of 1987; 39 of 2000 s. 7)

The non-accountable GFA is further defined in Practice Notes for Authorized Persons, Registered Structural Engineers and Registered Geotechnical Engineers no APP-2.

Permitted GFA in Hong Kong land lease agreement generally the maximum GFA (excluding the non-accountable above) to develop. However it may be further reduced by the effect of plot ratio, maximum site coverage, maximum permitted height of building and Outline Zoning Plan. Moreover, roof and other uncovered area is exclude in Permitted GFA but usually had restricted use as opening space, corridor or emergence escaping area.

Green features

Since 2001, to encourage the incorporation of green features in building developments, further facilities could be excluded/disregard in GFA. and defined at Joint Practice Notes on protection and improvement of the built and natural environment no. 1 and no. 2. Since such facilities granted extra floor area to develop and usually included in the GFA/ selling area the developer sold to end-user, which made end-user confused, government planned to abolish the exclusion of green features and use alternative way to encourage green features. For the total floor area, HK use the term "site coverage".

=== In Singapore ===
GFA in Singapore, defined by Urban Redevelopment Authority as of March 2014 is:

3 Definition of gross floor area

3.1 All covered floor areas of a building, except otherwise exempted, and uncovered areas for commercial uses are deemed the gross floor area of the building for purposes of plot ratio control and development charge. The gross floor area is the total area of the covered floor space measured between the centre line of party walls, including the thickness of external walls but excluding voids. Accessibility and usability are not criteria for exclusion from GFA.

3.2 URA reserves the right to decide on GFA matters based on the specific design of a development proposal on a case-by-case basis.

With effect from January 2014, Private enclosed spaces (PES) and private roof terraces (PRT) are counted as part of the bonus GFA capped at 10% above the Master Plan that also includes balconies.

== Gross leasable area ==
Gross leasable area, alternatively called gross lettable area (GLA), is the amount of floor space available to be rented in a commercial property. Specifically, gross leasable area is the total floor area designed for tenant occupancy and exclusive use, including any basements, mezzanines, or upper floors.

GLA is typically expressed in square meters (although in some places that use the imperial system, such as the United States, Canada, and the United Kingdom, a measure of square feet is used). It is measured from the center line of joint partitions and from outside wall faces. That is, gross leasable area is the area for which tenants pay rent, and thus the area that produces income for the property owner.

For a property with only one tenant, the measurements gross floor area (GFA) and gross leasable area (GLA) are essentially equal.

The Building Owners and Managers Association has established a standard with American National Standards Institute, ANSI/BOMA Z65.1-1996 for measuring floor area and calculating gross leasable area and loss factor.

== See also ==
- Floor area ratio
