= Chartered Institution of Civil Engineering Surveyors =

Professional surveying organisation

- Established: 1969 (2009 charter)
- Type: Civil engineering surveying professional association
- Headquarters: Sale, Greater Manchester, England
- Coordinates: 53.4236°N 2.3243°W
- Region served: Worldwide
- Members: 5,100 (2019)
- Key people: Alison Watson, president
- Subsidiaries: SURCO Ltd
- Website: www.cices.org

The Chartered Institution of Civil Engineering Surveyors or CICES is a professional association in the field of civil engineering surveying, headquartered in the United Kingdom. CICES members consist mainly of commercial managers, quantity surveyors, and geospatial engineers working and studying within civil engineering surveying. The institution began in 1969 as the Association of Surveyors in Civil Engineering, became a registered educational charity in 1992, and received a royal charter in 2009.

== Publications ==
CICES publishes the Civil Engineering Surveyor, a monthly periodical publication, as well as annual supplements including Geospatial Engineering and the Construction Law Review. Further publications include industry white papers, and client guides to subjects such as utilities survey and infrastructure monitoring.

== Collaboration ==
In 1992, CICES became the first associated institution of the Institution of Civil Engineers (ICE) and together formed two joint boards to provide and disseminate surveying knowledge and expertise; the Geospatial Engineering Board and the Commercial Management Board. Uren and Price considered the 1997 book The Management of Setting Out in Construction to be one of the most important practice guides published by the Geospatial Engineering Board. CICES also has reciprocal membership agreements in place with the ICE.

Since the 1980s CICES has worked with The Survey Association and the Royal Institution of Chartered Surveyors, together forming the Survey Liaison Group, to provide leadership for the UK survey industry including organisation of the annual GeoBusiness conference and publication and endorsement of technical guidance. Members of CICES are eligible for direct entry to the Royal Institution of Chartered Surveyors.

CICES and the Association for Geographic Information (AGI) have agreed specialist discipline competencies for membership of CICES through the Geographic Information Science (GIS) route.

== International recognition ==
CICES is an internationally recognised qualifying body established to regulate, educate and train surveyors working within civil engineering. The headquarters are in the United Kingdom, with 11 regions consisting of volunteer-led committee members. CICES regions include the UK, Ireland, Hong Kong and the United Arab Emirates. CICES also has memoranda of understandings agreements with many international surveying institutions and is a member of the International Federation of Surveyors (FIG).

== Membership ==
Applicants for membership must demonstrate that they have fulfilled the institution's competency requirements including general and core competencies, plus at least one specialism, and applications must be reviewed and signed off by a sponsor.

Members may use designations after their names such as:

- FCInstCES for Fellow of the Chartered Institution of Civil Engineering Surveyors
- MCInstCES for Member of the Chartered Institution of Civil Engineering Surveyors
- TCInstCES for Technical Member of the Chartered Institution of Civil Engineering Surveyors
- GCInstCES for Graduate Member of the Chartered Institution of Civil Engineering Surveyors

Members and Fellows of CICES are eligible to attain Incorporated Engineer and Chartered Engineer status through the Engineering Council. Members of CICES are eligible, as engineers, to directly undertake consultation or instruction of Bar Council barristers via the licensed access scheme.

== See also ==
- Remote Sensing and Photogrammetry Society
- Royal Institution of Chartered Surveyors
