= Manufactured Housing Institute =

- Abbreviation: MHI
- Formation: September 1, 1975 (51 years ago)
- Type: NGO
- Legal status: Trade association
- Purpose: Factory built housing resource
- Headquarters: Arlington, VA, U.S.
- Location: 1655 North Fort Myer Drive, 22209
- Coordinates: 38.893792°N 77.071678°W
- Official language: English
- Website: MHI

The Manufactured Housing Institute (MHI) is a U.S. trade organization representing companies and organizations that are involved in the production, sale and financing of manufactured housing, prefabricated home and modular home units.

The MHI hosts trade conferences, coordinates lobbying before the United States Congress and state legislatures on issues relating to manufactured housing, compiles and publishes data relating to industry sales and provides marketing and public relations support to raise the awareness of manufactured housing.

The organization was created in 1975 and is headquartered in Arlington, Virginia. It maintains statewide chapters across the country.

== See also ==
Property management
Property manager
