= Occupancy cost =

Occupancy costs are the whole life costs of buildings and their associated land from occupancy until disposal. These costs may be incurred on a regular or irregular basis.

Occupancy costs are those costs related to occupying a space including; rent, real estate taxes, personal property taxes, insurance on building and contents, depreciation, and amortization expenses. These are generally higher in new entrants to a market due to the escalating real estate prices.
