= Property management =

Management of real estate and physical property

Property management is the operation, control, maintenance, and oversight of real estate and physical property. This can include residential, commercial, industrial, public capital, and land real estate. Management indicates the need for real estate to be cared for and monitored, with accountability for and attention to its useful life and condition. This is much akin to the role of management in any business.

Property management is the administration of personal property, equipment, tooling, and physical capital assets acquired and used to build, repair, and maintain end-item deliverables. Property management involves the processes, systems, and workforce required to manage the life cycle of all acquired property as defined above, including acquisition, control, accountability, responsibility, maintenance, utilization, and disposition.

An owner of a single-family home, condominium, or multi-family building may engage the services of a professional property management company. The company will then advertise the rental property, handle tenant inquiries, screen applicants, select suitable candidates, draw up a lease agreement, conduct a move-in inspection, move the tenant(s) into the property and collect rental income. The company will then coordinate any maintenance issues, supply the owner(s) with financial statements and any relevant information regarding the property, etc.

== Roles and responsibilities ==
Property management involves a wide range of tasks and responsibilities carried out by property managers, management companies, or individual landlords. Property managers serve as the operational backbone of real estate ownership, balancing the financial interests of the owner with the comfort and satisfaction of tenants while maintaining the property’s long-term value.

The specific roles depend on the type of property—residential, commercial, or industrial—but generally include:

=== Tenant relations ===
Property managers act as intermediaries between property owners and tenants. They handle tenant inquiries, process applications, conduct screenings, negotiate lease agreements, and coordinate move-in and move-out procedures. In most settings, property management companies also operate the mailroom of the buildings in which they lease to tenants or manage on behalf of the landlord client; Mailroom Operations is a component of property management.

=== Rent collection and financial management ===
Managers are responsible for collecting rent, enforcing payment terms, issuing late notices, and managing security deposits. Many also prepare financial statements, budgets, and reports for property owners, ensuring compliance with local and national regulations.

=== Maintenance and repairs ===
A key role of property management is the maintenance of the property. This includes scheduling regular inspections, coordinating repairs, overseeing contractors, and ensuring that the property meets safety and habitability standards.

Facilities management (or facility management) is a professional discipline within property management, focused on coordinating the use of space, infrastructure, people, and organizational resources to ensure that physical assets and environments are managed effectively to meet the needs of their users.

- Building services or building services engineering, strives to achieve a safe and comfortable indoor environment while minimizing the environmental impact of a building; it, as a part of facilities management and property management, plays a part in the operation and management of physical infrastructure in the built environment.

=== Legal and regulatory compliance ===
Property managers must ensure that the property adheres to housing laws, landlord-tenant regulations, fair housing rules, and zoning ordinances. They may also handle evictions and represent owners in legal proceedings related to tenancy issues.

=== Marketing and leasing ===
In residential and commercial contexts, managers are often responsible for advertising vacancies, setting rental rates based on market conditions, and maintaining high occupancy levels through effective marketing strategies.

=== Administrative duties ===
Administrative responsibilities may include record-keeping, contract management, insurance coordination, and maintaining communication with property owners and vendors.

== Property management business pricing models ==
=== Percentage of rent ===
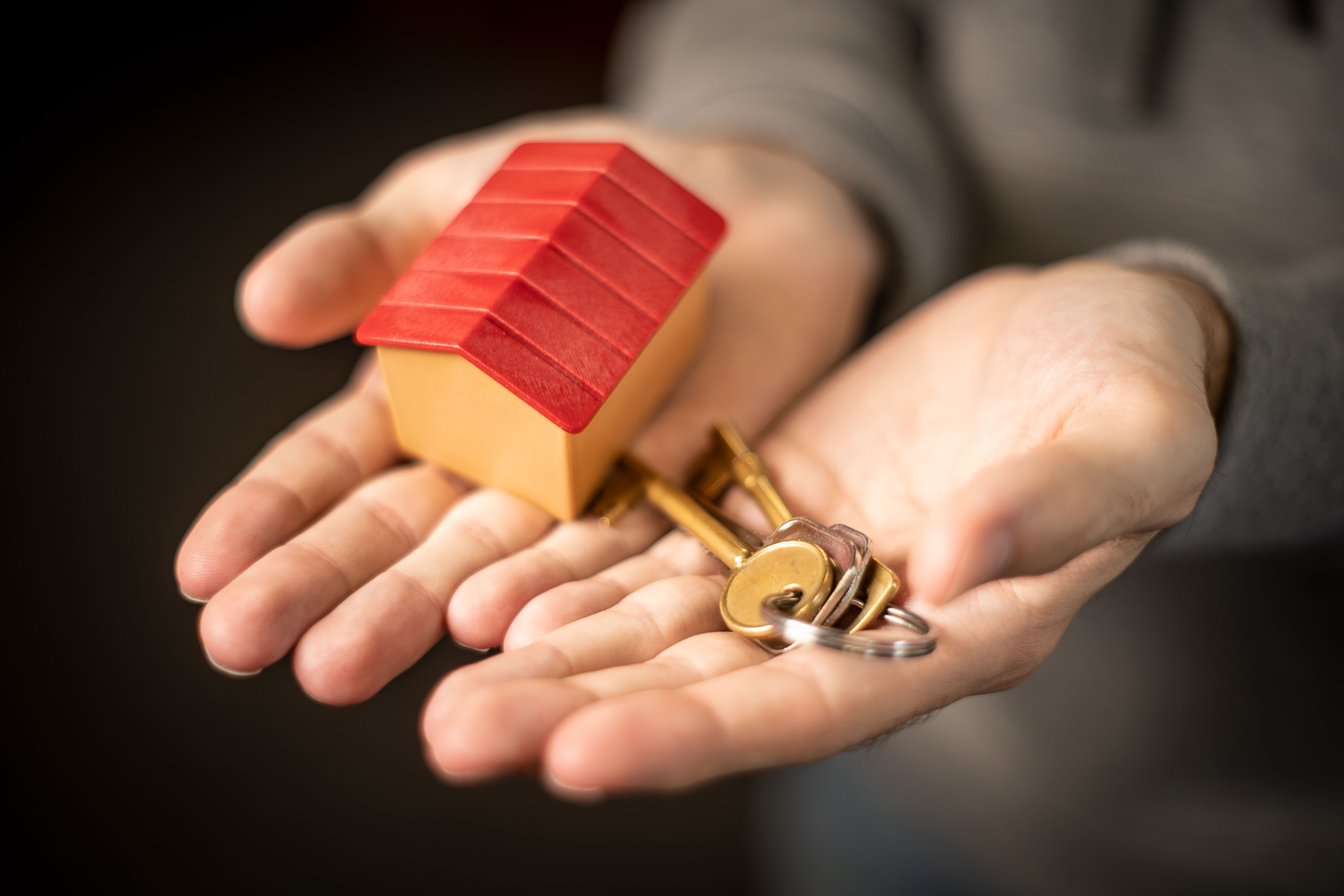
Renting a House - Leasing a Property

The percentage of rent model is the most common property management model, typically used by companies managing multi-unit residential buildings and single-family homes. In this arrangement, the property owner enters into a management agreement granting the company the authority to lease the house or property to new tenants and collect rent on the owner’s behalf. Property owners are generally not directly involved with tenants and may not even know their identities. The management company usually retains between 8% and 12% of the rental income as a management fee, remitting the remainder to the property owner.

=== Flat-fee / fixed-fee ===
A fixed-fee property management model, also known as a flat-fee model, is an alternative to the traditional percentage-based structure. In this arrangement, the property management company charges a predetermined monthly or annual fee for its services, regardless of the property’s rental income. This model is often preferred by property owners seeking predictable management costs, especially for higher-rent properties where a percentage-based fee could result in higher expenses.

Under a fixed-fee agreement, the scope of services—such as tenant placement, rent collection, maintenance coordination, and property inspections—is typically defined in advance. Some companies offer tiered or customizable service packages to accommodate different owner needs. The fixed-fee model has gained popularity in recent years due to its transparency, cost stability, and appeal to investors managing multiple rental units.

The flat-fee model is also popular among vacation property owners who do not wish to rent out their properties but want a management company to oversee maintenance, inspections, and general upkeep.

==== Hybrid pricing model ====
A growing trend in property management, is the hybrid pricing model, which combines elements of both percentage-based and fixed-fee structures. Under this approach, property management companies charge a reduced percentage of the monthly rent along with a flat administrative fee. This model aims to balance affordability and service flexibility, providing property owners with predictable costs while ensuring management companies maintain sustainable revenue for operational expenses.

=== Guaranteed rent ===
This model is also used in the residential space, but mostly for small units in high-demand locations. Here, the company signs a rental agreement with the owner and pays them a fixed rent. As per the agreement, the company is given the right to sublet the property for a higher rent. The company's income is the difference between the two rents. As is evident, in this case, the company minimizes the rent paid to the owner, which is usually lower than market rates.

=== Revenue share / Percentage Lease ===
A percentage lease is a type of commercial lease commonly used in retail environments, particularly in shopping centers and other high-traffic locations. Under this arrangement, the tenant pays a fixed base rent in addition to a percentage of their gross sales that exceed a specified amount, known as the breakpoint. This structure aligns the interests of the landlord and tenant by allowing rent to fluctuate based on the tenant’s sales performance.

== Software and property technology solutions ==
The property management services market has increasingly emphasized technological innovation, largely driven by the adoption of software such as property management systems, hotel operating systems (HOS), and property technology (PropTech) solutions. The global property management software market was valued at approximately USD 5.51 billion in 2023 and is expected to grow to around USD 9.68 billion by 2030.

Many property management firms now utilize artificial intelligence (AI), Internet of Things (IoT)–enabled maintenance systems, mobile applications, and cloud-based platforms to improve operational efficiency and tenant engagement. These technologies facilitate functions such as predictive maintenance, automated rent collection, digital leasing processes, and data analytics for real-time decision-making. As tenant expectations continue to evolve, PropTech has become an integral component of contemporary property management practices.

== Property management licensing ==
Licensing requirements for property managers vary widely depending on the jurisdiction and type of property but generally aim to ensure professional standards, consumer protection, and ethical business practices within the real estate industry. As a result, Property management is a regulated profession in many countries with licensing requirements designed to protect property owners and tenants alike. The specific requirements vary by country, region, state, etc but in many cases, property managers must hold a real estate broker’s license or a specialized property management license to legally manage rental properties on behalf of others.

To obtain a license, applicants are typically required to complete pre-licensing education, pass a state examination, and undergo a background check. Once licensed, property managers must follow state and/or local laws that govern leasing practices, trust accounting, fair housing compliance, and tenant-landlord relations.

In some places, unlicensed individuals may manage properties they personally own, but cannot legally collect rent, negotiate leases, or represent other property owners without proper licensure. Some places offer exceptions or separate licensing paths for managing community associations, vacation rentals, or commercial properties.

Even in areas without strict licensing laws, many professional property managers voluntarily pursue certification through national organizations such as the Institute of Real Estate Management (IREM) or the National Association of Residential Property Managers (NARPM). These credentials help demonstrate knowledge, professionalism, and a commitment to ethical standards in the industry.

=== Licensing requirements by country / region ===
==== Australia ====
Every state of Australia except South Australia requires a license to manage property. In South Australia, a property management business must be run by a registered land agent.

==== Canada ====
In Canada, the laws governing property management and landlord–tenant relations are largely a provincial responsibility. Each province and territory makes its own laws on these matters.

===== British Columbia =====
The licensing and ongoing education of Property Managers is regulated by the provincial government and licensing by the BC Financial Services Authority a regulatory agency established by the provincial government.

===== Ontario =====
In Ontario, no licensing is required to operate; however, ACMO—the Association of Condo Managers of Ontario|Association of Condo Managers of Ontario—is a self-governing body for certification and designation of its members who run buildings with more than 600 units.

===== Saskatchewan and Alberta =====
Both require property managers to hold a real estate license.

==== Germany ====
In Germany, property management is divided into the areas of home owner's association management (WEG-Verwaltung), rental management (Mietverwaltung), and special property management (Sondereigentumsverwaltung) with different clients and tasks. Since 2018, a license in accordance with the Trade Regulation Act (§ 34 C GewO) is mandatory for property managers.

==== Hong Kong ====
In Hong Kong property management licensing is redulated by the Property Management Services Authority (PMSA)

==== Ireland ====
In the Republic of Ireland, there is no legal obligation to form a property management company. However, management companies are generally formed to manage multi-unit developments and must then follow the general rules of company law in terms of ownership and administration.

Since July 2012, it has become mandatory for all property service providers, including property management companies, to be registered and fully licensed by the Property Services Regulatory Authority of Ireland.

The National Consumer Agency (NCA) has campaigned in this area, and in September 2008 it launched a website explaining consumer rights. The NCA does not have a legislative or regulatory function in the area, unless a consumer complaint is in relation to a breach of consumer law.

==== Kenya ====
In Kenya, the Estate Agents Registration Board (EARB) is the regulatory body for estate agency practice and licensing.

==== New Zealand ====
Commercial Property Management leasing agents in New Zealand are required to have a real estate agents licence and operate an audited trust bank account. Commercial leases are covered by the Property Law Act 1952. Residential property management in New Zealand is an unlicensed and unregulated industry.

==== United Kingdom ====
In the United Kingdom, there is no statutory regulation concerning property management companies. Companies that manage rented residential property are often members of the Association of Residential Letting Agents. Companies or individual landlords who accept tenancy deposits for "assured shorthold tenancies" (the usual form of residential tenancy) are required by statute to be members of a Tenancy Deposit Scheme.

==== United States ====
Most states, such as New York and Colorado, require property management companies to be licensed real estate brokers if they are collecting rent, listing properties for rent, or helping negotiate leases and doing inspections as a third-party. A property manager may be a licensed real estate salesperson but generally they must be working under a licensed real estate broker. Most states have a public license check system online for anyone holding a real estate salesperson or real estate broker's license. A few states, such as Idaho, Maine, and Vermont, do not require property managers to have real estate licenses. Other states, such as Montana, Oregon, and South Carolina, allow property managers to work under a property management license rather than a broker's license. Some states, like Pennsylvania, allow property managers to work without a real estate license if they do not negotiate leases, hold tenants' money, or enter into leases on the property owner's behalf.

Owners who manage their own property are not required to have a real estate license in many states; however, they must at least have a business license to rent out their own home. Owners who do not live near the rental property may be required, by local government, to hire the services of a property management company. Some states with high tourism numbers, such as Hawaii, have strict property management rules.

In California, third-party apartment property managers must be licensed with the California Bureau of Real Estate as a real estate broker. A broker's license is required for any person or company that, for compensation, leases or rents or offers to lease or rent, or places for rent, or solicits listing of places for rent, or solicits for prospective tenants, or negotiates the sale, purchase, or exchange of leases on real property, or on a business opportunity, or collects rents from real property, or improvements thereon, or from business opportunities. California Code of Regulations, Title 25, Section 42, requires property owners of apartment buildings with 16 or more units to have on-site resident managers living on their properties. There is no such requirement for apartment buildings with less than 16 units.

The designation Real Estate Broker is often confused by those unfamiliar with terms of the industry such as Realtor, real estate agent, or real estate salesperson, and definitions vary from US state to state.

== Professional designations ==
Building Owners and Managers Association (BOMA International) offers industry-standard designations that certify the training to property managers:

- Real Property Administrator (RPA)
- Facilities Management Administrator (FMA)
- Systems Maintenance Administrator (SMA)
- Systems Maintenance Technician (SMT)

Institute of Real Estate Management (IREM)

- Certified Property Manager (CPM)
- Accredited Residential Manager (ARM)
- Accredited Commercial Manager (ACoM)
- Accredited Management Organization (AMO)

Manufactured Housing Institute (MHI)

- Accredited Community Manager (ACM)
- Professional Housing Consultant (PHC)

National Apartment Association (NAA) has the following designations:

- Certified Apartment Manager (CAM)
- Certified Apartment Property Supervisor (CAPS)
- Certificate for Apartment Maintenance Technicians (CAMT)
- National Apartment Leasing Professional (NALP)

National Association of Residential Property Managers (NARPM) offers designations to certify ethical and professional standards of conduct for property managers:

- Residential Management Professional (RMP)
- Master Property Manager (MPM)
- Certified Support Specialist (CSS)
- Certified Residential Management Company (CRMC)
- Certified Maintenance Coordinator (CMC)
- Certified Residential Management Bookkeeper (CRMB)

State-specific designations include the following:

- California Certified Community Association Manager (CCAM)
- Florida Community Association Manager (CAM)
- Minnesota Certified Community Association Manager (CCAM)
- Minnesota: Certified Residential Manager (CRM)

The Community Associations Institute also has designations in the United States for residential property managers who manage planned communities such as Condominiums, homeowner associations, and Cooperatives. National designations include:

- Association Management Specialist (AMS)
- Certified Manager of Community Associations (CMCA)
- Large Scale Manager (LSM)
- Professional Community Association Manager (PCAM)—highest designation awarded.

The National Association of Home Builders has a specialized designation for the affordable housing industry through the Low Income Housing Tax Credit (LIHTC) program:

- Housing Credit Certified Professional (HCCP)

In the UK:

- Association of Residential Managing Agents (ARMA, now The Property Institute, TPI)
- Institute of Residential Property Management (IRPM, now The Property Institute, TPI)

In Kenya:

- Estate Agents Registration Board (EARB)
- Kenya Property Developers Association (KPDA)
- Kenya Professional Realtors Association (KPRA)

== See also ==
- Building management
- Facility management
- Home 365
- Lease administration
- Property maintenance
- Property manager
