= Real Property Administrator =

Professional designation for commercial property managers

The Real Property Administrator (RPA) designation is a professional designation for commercial property managers awarded to people with several years of experience and completing the Building Owners and Managers Association advanced study program. The designation is administered by Building Owners and Managers Institute (BOMI) International, an independent nonprofit institute for property and facility management education. The program covers all aspects of operating a commercial property and maximizing a net income while minimizing risk.

Required coursework includes:

- Law and Risk management
- Budgeting and accounting
- Environmental health and safety
- Business ethics
- Real estate investment and finance
- Design operation and maintenance of building systems

== See also ==
- English land law
- Property manager
