= Building Owners and Managers Association =

- Building Owners and Managers Association
- Abbreviation: BOMA
- Formation: 1907; 119 years ago
- Headquarters: Washington, DC
- Field: commercial real estate
- Members: more than 30,000 as of May 2024
- Website: bomabest.org

The Building Owners and Managers Association (BOMA International) is a trade organization founded in 1907 for commercial real estate professionals. Its mission is to advance the performance of commercial real estate through advocacy, promoting professional competency, standards and research.

== Standards ==
BOMA first published the Standard Method of Floor Measurement for Office Buildings in 1915 which became the BOMA Method for the Measurement of Buildings. Since then, it has become an international standard for determining the dimensions of buildings. The American National Standards Institute recognizes this standard as ANSI Z65. The US Government recognizes this standard in 48 CFR 570.102 and 48 CFR 552.270-4 to define "the area where a tenant normally houses personnel, and/or furniture, for which a measurement is to be computed." This standard is critical as it is used by architects to determine a commercial building's efficiency, specifically its rentable space vs. usable space vs. gross area.

BOMA is a founding member of the International Property Measurement Standards Coalition.

== Sustainability ==
In 2002, BOMA worked with Arizona State University and the Athena Institute to evolve the Green Globes sustainability assessment tool to be more widely adoptable by US and Canadian commercial properties as part of the Green Building Initiative.

In 2008, BOMA published the BOMA Guide to promote the implementation of sustainable building practices in commercial properties. It was designed to facilitate building owners and tenants entering into environmentally sustainable leases without the rigidity of the guidelines proscribed by the U.S. Green Building Council.

== Professional accreditation ==
As of March 2022 BOMI offers the following professional certifications / credentials for commercial real estate professionals:

| Name | Post-nominal |
|---|---|
| Real Property Administrator | RPA |
| Facilities Management Administrator | FMA |
| Systems Maintenance Technician | SMT |
| Systems Maintenance Administrator | SMA |
