= Royal Institution of Chartered Surveyors =

Organisation

The Royal Institution of Chartered Surveyors

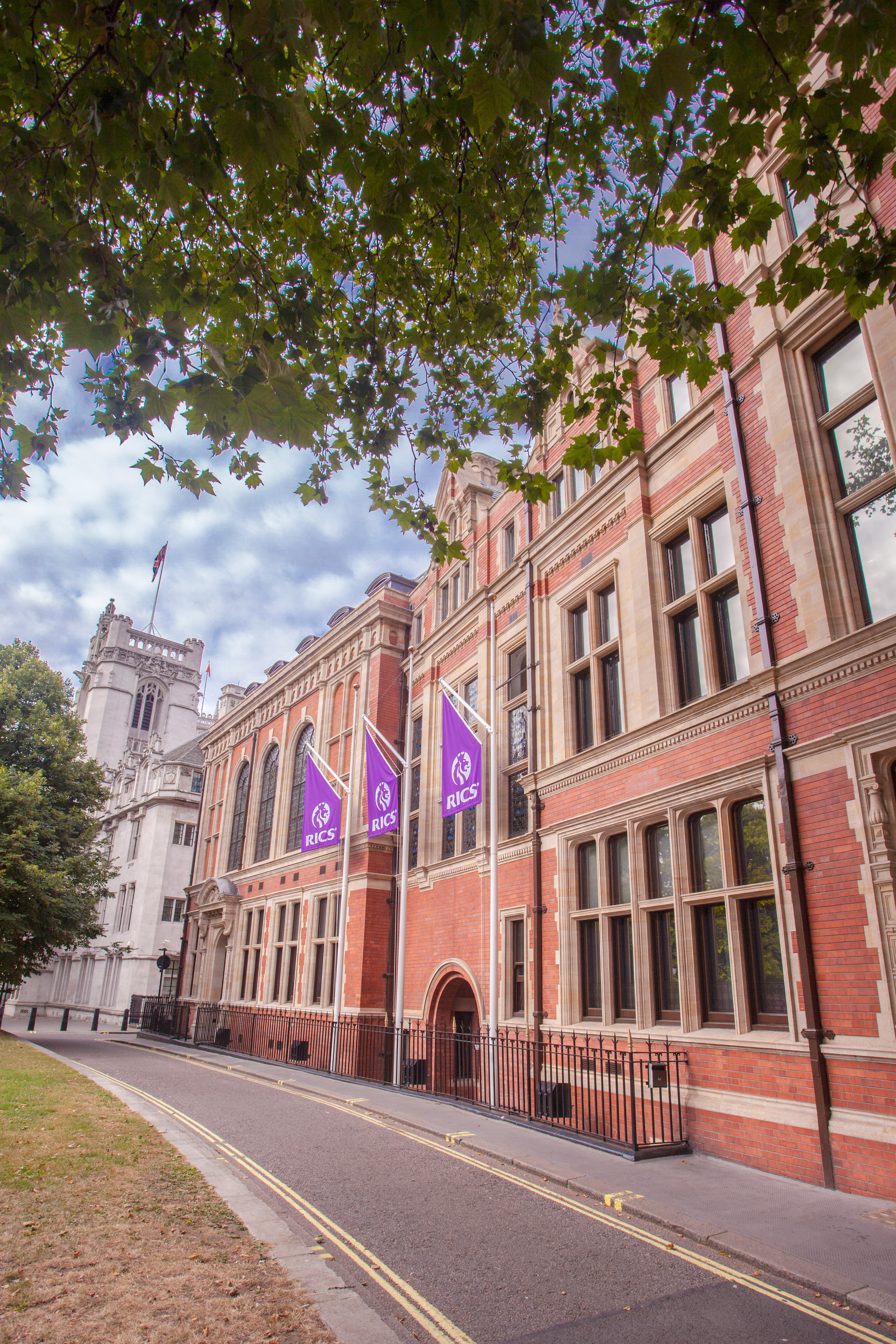
- RICS headquarters at Parliament Square
- Abbreviation: RICS
- Founded: 1868; 158 years ago
- Type: Professional body
- Registration no.: RC000487
- Legal status: Royal Charter company
- Headquarters: 12 Great George Street; London, England
- Coordinates: 51°30′3″N 0°7′41″W
- Region served: Worldwide
- Members: 113,000 (2025)
- Chief executive officer: Justin Young
- President: Nicholas Maclean
- Staff: c. 900
- Website: www.rics.org
- Remarks: Members' designations: FRICS, MRICS, AssocRICS

The Royal Institution of Chartered Surveyors (RICS) is a professional body for those working in the Built Environment, Construction, Land, Property and Real Estate. It was founded in 1868 in London, England, and currently has offices around the world. The RICS works at a cross-governmental level, and aims to promote and enforce the highest international standards in the valuation, management and development of land, real estate, construction and infrastructure.

Founded as the Institution of Surveyors, it received a royal charter in 1881 and became the Royal Institution of Chartered Surveyors in 1947. With its headquarters in London and regional offices across the United Kingdom, plus international offices, it serves a 113,000-strong membership distributed over nearly 150 countries. The RICS is linked to other national surveying institutions, collaborates with other professional bodies, and, in 2013, was a founder member of a coalition to develop the International Property Measurement Standards (IPMS). It also produces cost information and professional guidance on valuation and other activities.

In September 2021, an independent review exposed poor governance practices at the highest levels of the RICS organisation, prompting the resignations of the president, chief executive, interim chair of the governing council, and chair of the management board, in addition to the earlier resignation of the chief operating officer. The report was labelled an "appalling advert for our profession on the world stage". A subsequent review published in June 2022 demanded a "transformation of the institution carried out at pace".

== History ==
It was founded in London, England, as the Institution of Surveyors after a meeting of 49 surveyors at the Westminster Palace Hotel on 15 June 1868. The inaugural president was John Clutton (who founded Cluttons, a property firm still in business today). The organisation has occupied headquarters on the corner of Great George Street and Little George Street since then. It received a Royal charter as The Surveyors' Institution on 26 August 1881, (Note: Under the charter, full members were classed as Fellows (FSI) or Professional Associates (PASI). Non-chartered associate and student memberships were also provided for.) The charter required RICS to "promote the usefulness of the profession for the public advantage in the UK and in other parts of the world."

The Surveyors' Institution became The Chartered Surveyors' Institution in 1930. George VI granted the title "Royal" in 1946, and the professional body became The Royal Institution of Chartered Surveyors in 1947.

In 1988, the RICS (with the CIOB, CIBSE, IstructE and RIBA) became a founding member of the Building Industry Council, today the Construction Industry Council.

In March 2025, RICS president Justin Sullivan "agreed to step aside" following criticism of his role as an expert witness in legal case regarding a £32.5 million moth-infested mansion. Sullivan referred himself to the body's standards and regulatory board. Nick Maclean, who is due to take over the presidency in 2026, was appointed as acting president temporarily.

== Coat of arms ==
The RICS was granted a coat of arms by the College of Arms in December 1967:

Coat of arms of Royal Institution of Chartered Surveyors

Granted
1 December 1967
Crest
On a wreath of the colours, In front of a Terrestrial Globe proper a pair of dividers Or.
Escutcheon
Azure, within a surveyor's chain in orle and issuant from the chief the capital of an Ionic column argent; on a chief of the last a lion passant guardant of the field.
Supporters
On either side a lion Or supporting a surveyor's ranging rod and resting the interior hind paw upon a log of wood proper.

== International influence ==
RICS has close links with many national surveying institutions and is a founding member association of the International Federation of Surveyors (FIG). Within RICS the primary areas of practice represented at FIG are geomatics (land and hydrographic survey), environment, planning, construction and valuation.

RICS works in close collaboration with other professional bodies, central banks and international organisations such as The United Nations, World Bank and The European Union.

In 2013, RICS was a founder member of the coalition to develop International Property Measurement Standards, which launched its first standard – for measuring office space – in November 2014. It launched its second standard, for measuring residential buildings, in September 2016. In 2014 RICS was a founder member of the coalition to develop International Ethics Standards, standards designed to add greater consistency to developing and reinforcing professional ethics globally – these launched in December 2016.

To add greater consistency to the benchmarking, measuring, and reporting of construction project costs, International Construction Measurement Standards were published in July 2017. The coalition for International Land Measurement Standards – aiding consistency of interpretation and documentation of tenure – launched in June 2016. In each case, coalition member bodies are committed to implementing the new standards through training and guidance for professional practitioners.

The RICS is a founder member of the International Valuation Standards Committee.

== Membership ==
In 2025, there were 113,000 RICS-qualified members of whom 105,000 are "Professional Members" ie Chartered Surveyors in nearly 150 countries. The majority of members are still based in the United Kingdom, but with large numbers also in mainland Europe, Australia and Hong Kong. There is also strong growth in membership globally, particularly in China, India and the Americas.

Entry to membership of RICS is via four main routes: academic; graduate; technical; and senior professional. RICS has links with universities worldwide, with whom they have accredited approved courses which satisfy part of the qualification requirements to become trainee surveyors. RICS also offers expedited routes to membership for qualified professional members of some partner associations.

RICS requires members to update their knowledge and competence during their working life through Continuing Professional Development. Professionals holding RICS qualifications may use the following designations after their name:

- AssocRICS (Associate); previously members at this level were known as Technical Members and used the designation "TechRICS"
- MRICS (Member); previously members at this level were known as Professional Associates and used the designation "ARICS".
- FRICS (Fellow).
- HonRICS (Honorary members)

Those with the designation MRICS or FRICS are "Professional Members" entitled to be known as Chartered Surveyors and variations such as "Chartered Building Surveyor", "Chartered Valuation Surveyor" or "Chartered Quantity Surveyor", depending on their chosen specialist qualifications and field of expertise.

Both AssocRICS and MRICS require the collation of a candidate's training and work experience to be assessed by RICS trained assessors, although some may be eligible for direct entry based on international qualifications. MRICS has a higher technical bar to entry and there is an academic prerequisite which does not exist for AssocRICS. MRICS applications are also subject to an Assessment of Professional Competence (APC) interview, held by a panel of Chartered Surveyors where the candidate's experience, knowledge and technical skill is assessed during the interview. FRICS is the highest accolade awarded and demonstrates the professional achievements of an individual. It is an honoured class of membership awarded and an international measure of excellence. Only those who hold the MRICS designation are eligible to apply for FRICS and they must meet the required number of professional characteristics.

=== Professional groups ===
RICS specifies areas of specialism, each with its own professional group, clustered into land, property and construction. Within each professional group there may be further specialisms.

Property professional groups	Land professional groups	Built environment professional groups
Arts & antiquities	Environment	Building control
Commercial property	Geomatics	Building surveying
Dispute resolution	Minerals & waste	Project management
Facilities management	Planning & development	Quantity surveying & Construction
Machinery & assets	Rural	Dilapidations forum
Management consultancy	Telecom forum	Insurance forum
Residential property		Infrastructure
Valuation		
Building conservation forum		

=== Specialist accreditations ===
RICS aims to cover, among its practising members, property and construction related expertise generally. Specialised areas of practice expertise for which accreditation is available include:

- Building Information Modelling (BIM) Manager Certification
- Building Conservation
- Chartered Environmentalists
- Dispute Resolution
- ECO Assessor Certification
- Fixed Charge Receivership Scheme
- Valuer Registration.

=== RICS Matrics ===
The junior branch of RICS, known as Matrics (pronounced "matrix"), provides educational support, charitable and networking activities for surveying students, trainee surveyors (of any age) and Chartered Surveyors with ten years or less post-qualification experience. It comprises some 40 local groups across the United Kingdom. Established in 1889 as the Junior Committee, it became the "Junior Organisation" ("JO") in 1928 and was re-branded as "RICS Matrics" in 2003. It also has links with the Young Chartered Surveyors in the Republic of Ireland.

== Governance ==
The RICS is governed by a governing council, to which report a management board, a standards and regulation board, and an audit committee.

=== 2019-2021 governance review ===
In January 2021, the RICS reversed a decision to suppress a 2019 BDO report critical of the organisation's financial governance. According to the Sunday Times, four non-executive directors had expressed concerns about the report's findings, but were dismissed in November 2019 by then president Chris Brooke. Following a letter from four past presidents, the RICS initially rejected an independent review, but, after the ousted directors also wrote a letter, then said its governing council would "revisit" the issue, and on 22 January 2021 announced it would initiate an independent inquiry into the affair. In 2019, RICS finances were reported to have been in a difficult position, the organisation having made a pre-tax loss of £4.7m on £91.3m of income from fees and commercial activities. It subsequently made 140 people redundant. In February 2021, the RICS president Kathleen Fontana said that, in addition to the independent review into the audit report, the governing council was agreeing a strategic review into the institution's governance and member engagement. Building reported member views that expensive membership fees did not reflect the benefits they receive, and that RICS' international expansion had been "at the expense of its core UK membership, which feels disengaged and neglected".

In April 2021, Peter Oldham, the chair of the independent review of RICS's governance resigned "for professional reasons", to be replaced by Alison Levitt QC with completion delayed to June 2021 – later pushed back to mid-August 2021. On 4 June 2021, Building reported the "surprise" resignation and immediate departure of RICS' chief operating officer Violetta Parylo amid "a storm of calls" from members for reform. The RICS review of its purpose and relevance had been published in May 2021. Based on 9,000 responses, it reported members' trust in the RICS had plummeted by nearly a third, while satisfaction with membership had fallen to a historic low of 43%.

==== Levitt review ====
Levitt's governance review was delivered to the RICS in early August but not immediately made public, prompting calls for its full publication; the report was first reviewed by a five-strong subgroup of RICS's 26-member governing council. Property Week columnist Peter Bill said "a private tiff has ballooned into a crisis of confidence in the 130,000-member institution" with a defensive management facing a small but powerful group of disaffected members. After the August departure of RICS managing director Matthew Howell, RICS CEO Sean Tompkins resigned on 9 September 2021, when the full Levitt Review was published; Tompkins also forfeited a £190,000 bonus payment. In light of the Review findings, RICS president Kathleen Fontana, the interim chair of the governing council Chris Brooke, and management board chair Paul Marcuse also resigned, and RICS terminated its relationship with London law firm Fieldfisher, criticised by Levitt for being "demonstrably and inappropriately partisan."

Levitt said the RICS had made it "as difficult as possible" for people to contact the review; "RICS management and others on occasion" gave an "impression of reluctant acquiescence" during her investigations, she said. Her 467-page report concluded that the four non-executive board members had been wrongly dismissed and that sound governance principles were not followed. The CEO and COO thus operated with little effective scrutiny and become resistant to challenge amid "a power struggle". Levitt recommended "a wide-ranging external review of purpose, governance and strategy, led by an independent reviewer", plus interim recommendations relating to governance, executive remuneration, whistle-blowing and legal advice. The RICS governing council committed to apologise to the dismissed non-executive directors, and to implement all the report's recommendations. On 30 September 2021, Building reported on a "grovelling public apology" from the RICS to the wrongfully dismissed non-executive directors, and said an external review of the institution's future purpose was set to start within weeks. The ousted non-executive directors welcomed the formal apology but said it was "difficult to accept it as a statement of genuine contrition".

Gleeds chairman and Building columnist Richard Steer called the governance scandal an "appalling advert for our profession on the world stage" and said RICS needed to undergo a "complete restructuring". Paul Roberts, MD of global law firm Secretariat, said all 21 members of the RICS's governing council should be removed and replaced with new blood elected by the RICS membership.

In October 2021, the RICS refused a request by 40 former and current employees to launch an investigation into how the institution selected staff to be furloughed during the COVID-19 pandemic. The employees group alleged that some staff were furloughed as RICS had considered them too supportive of the institution's membership, and sought a review of RICS's human resource procedures, but RICS refused, considering the matter closed.

The Cabinet Office provided advice on suitable individuals to lead the review of the RICS's future purpose. In December 2021, the RICS announced former senior civil servant Michael Bichard would lead a six-month review into its governance and future purpose, with three objectives set by the RICS's governing council: to "create clarity" about the RICS' purpose, to propose how the organisation could be a "beacon for best practice" in governance, transparency and accountability, and to ensure that governance is "fit for today" and could remain relevant in future.

==== Bichard review ====
The 68-page Bichard review, recommending sweeping reforms, was published on 21 June 2022. It said the future success of the organisation would "require nothing less than a transformation of the institution carried out at pace"; the need for change was "urgent" and "unarguable". Bichard's recommendations included: a renewed and increased focus on the public interest remit of RICS, including amending the Royal Charter and creating a public interest panel to advise the RICS's Governing Council; maintaining self-regulation, through greater independence for regulatory functions; increased focus on diversity and inclusion; empowering and enabling members through greater support for regional boards, alongside increased member engagement, with renewed focus on younger members; an independent review of RICS's governance and effectiveness at delivering against its Charter for the public advantage once every five years; a new simplified, clear, accountable governance structure; and greater leadership on major society issues such as sustainability and climate change. Bichard also said the RICS should seek to continue to increase its influence overseas - a policy that was "very contentious" among the institution's 140,000 members.

Bichard said: "My aim has been to help create a new sense of purpose and direction so that RICS can once more stand tall as an exemplar professional institution, capable of tackling the challenges which will shape the way we all live our lives in the years to come. Issues such as climate change and sustainability, improving the built environment and building safety all sit within the remit of RICS and will benefit from the contribution which a revitalised RICS could make."

Nick Maclean, interim chair of RICS's governing council, said: "The Bichard RICS Review represents a watershed moment for the institution, and a key point in time which sets out a path for permanent improvement. Implementation of the recommendations will provide a solid accountable structure to effectively support our professionals and work in the public interest. RICS governing council strongly endorses the recommendations, and will implement these proposals." McLean was set to stand down on 5 October 2022, his role being abolished as part of Bichard's recommendations; the chief executive role would also be replaced by a new director general.

In August 2022, Bichard was appointed as interim senior independent governor through to 31 December 2023, responsible for scrutinising the actions of the RICS' governing council and committees. In December 2022, the RICS announced the establishment of a new board to oversee day-to-day operations and deliver the governing council's strategic plan. It is to be chaired by former CBRE Group director Martin Samworth. He will also review proposed changes to constitutional documents, including the RICS's Royal Charter, recommended in Bichard's review.

=== Governance review over fire safety ===
In January 2022, the Department for Levelling Up, Housing and Communities was reporting to be planning legislation to enable regular reviews of the RICS's governance. Ministers were said to be frustrated by a RICS decision in December 2021 to maintain its valuation advice requiring External Wall System forms (EWS1s) on blocks under 18m high. Richard Collins, the RICS's interim CEO, publicly questioned the need for the proposed new law to monitor RICS's governance.

=== Presidents ===
The first president was John Clutton, who was elected in 1868. The first female president was Louise Brooke-Smith, who was elected in 2014.

- 1868 John Clutton
- 1870 Richard Hall
- 1872 Edward Norton Clifton
- 1874 Thomas Huskinson
- 1876 Edmund James Smith
- 1878 William Sturge
- 1880 Edward Ryde
- 1883 Thomas Smith-Woolley
- 1885 Edward L’Anson
- 1886 William James Beadel MP
- 1888 Elias Putts Squarey
- 1890 Robert Collier Driver
- 1892 Charles John Schoppe
- 1894 Thomas Chatfeild-Clarke
- 1895 Daniel Watney
- 1897 Christopher Oakley
- 1898 Robert Vigers
- 1899 Thomas Miller Mickman
- 1900 John Sharp
- 1901 Sir John F L Rolleston MP
- 1902 Arthur Vernon
- 1903 Albert Buck
- 1904 Herbert Thomas Steward
- 1905 Charles Bidwell
- 1906 George Langridge
- 1907 Thomas Taylor Wainwright
- 1908 Howard Martin
- 1909 Sir Alexander Rose Stennard
- 1910 Leslie Robert Vigers
- 1911 Sir W Edgar Horne MP
- 1912 Hon Edward Gerald Strutt CH
- 1913 William Edward Wooley
- 1914 Howard Chatfield Clarke
- 1915 John Henry Hanson
- 1916 Rt Hon George Francis Stewart
- 1917 Arthur Lyon Ryce
- 1918 Sir John Hubert Oakley GBE
- 1919 Andrew Young
- 1920 John Willmot
- 1921 Joseph Henry Sabin
- 1922 John McClarke Clarke
- 1923 Sir James Ingus Davidson
- 1924 Sir Edwin Savill OBE
- 1925 John David Wallis
- 1926 Denly Watney
- 1927 Edward Samuel Cox
- 1928 Charles Browning Fisher CBE
- 1929 Charles Henry Bidwells
- 1930 Ernest Hootham Leeder
- 1931 John Evans Bidwell
- 1932 Percival Fox Tuckett
- 1933 Charles Gerald Eve
- 1934 Alan Arnold
- 1935 Harry Mercow Stanley
- 1936 John Medows Theobald
- 1937 Robert Cobb
- 1938 Sir Charles Bressey CB CBE
- 1939 Oswald Healing
- 1940 Herbert Arthur Stweward
- 1941 Maj-Gen Sir Herbert Covington Cole CB
- 1942 Geoffrey Leslie Vigers
- 1943 William Charles Farnsworth
- 1944 James Bark
- 1945 Edward Bailey Gillet
- 1946 Alfred George Harfield
- 1947 Richard William Trumpler
- 1948 Stanley Vivian Hoys
- 1949 John Arthur Fowls Watson
- 1950 Herbert Percival Hobbs
- 1951 John Anthony Arnold-Forster OBE
- 1952 John Cassles Pinkerton MC
- 1953 George Arnold Coombe MC
- 1954 Charles Percival Bowyer TD
- 1955 William Robinson Brackett OBE TD
- 1956 Walter Edward Avison Bull
- 1957 William Morton Balch
- 1958 Frances George Fruley OBE
- 1959 John Lewe Postlethwaite
- 1960 John Douglas Tristram Eve
- 1961 Eric Codwill Strathem
- 1962 Geofrey Henry Haywood
- 1963 Charlie Dennis Pilcher
- 1964 George Dixon Walford
- 1965 Sir Henry Weston Wells CBE
- 1966 Guy Biscoe
- 1967 Hugh Brian Eve
- 1968 Sir Oliver Sidney Chesterton MC
- 1969 John Clarke OBE TD
- 1970 Edmund James Battersby
- 1971 John Brendon George MBE TD
- 1972 Martin Somervell Argles
- 1973 Edward Norman Harris AFC
- 1974 Bernard John Collins CBE
- 1975 David MacFarland Doig
- 1976 Charles Field Frankton MBE
- 1977 Frank Cecil Knowles
- 1978 Peter Witheroe Grafton CBE
- 1979 Ronald Marshall Wilson
- 1980 John Nigel Courtenay James
- 1981 Philip Richard Vernon Watkins
- 1982 Richard William Peter Luff
- 1983 Clifford Thomas Dann
- 1984 Geoffrey Malcolm Townsend
- 1985 Paul David Orchard-Lisle CBE TD DL
- 1986 Donald Alexander Gordon Troup
- 1987 Michael Garth Clarke TD
- 1988 David Harris Robert Yorke
- 1989 David Ronald Male
- 1990 Sir Daniel Norton Idris Pearce CBE
- 1991 Edward Watts
- 1992 Christopher William Jonas
- 1993 Clive Hewitt Lewis
- 1994 Ron Swanston
- 1995 Simon Francis Pott
- 1996 Jeremy David Baggot Bayliss
- 1997 Peter McKendrick
- 1998 Richard Neville Lay
- 1999 Simon Henry Kolesar
- 2000 Jonathan David Harris OBE
- 2001 Peter Ralph Faulkner
- 2002 Peter William Fall
- 2003 Nicholas Brooke
- 2004 Barry Gordon Gilbertson
- 2005 Stephen Glynn Williams
- 2006 Graham Frank Chase
- 2007 David William Tuffin
- 2008 Peter Eliot Goodacre RD
- 2009 Max Osborn Crofts
- 2010 Robert Peto
- 2011 See Lian Ong KMN
- 2012 Alan Pascoe Collett
- 2013 Micheal Clive Newey
- 2014 Jane Louise Brooke-Smith
- 2015 Martin Johannes Brühl
- 2016 Amanda Georgina Clack
- 2017 John Winston Hughes
- 2018 Christopher John Brooke
- 2019 Timothy Neal
- 2020 Kathleen Fontana (Note: Following publication of the Levitt Review, Fontana resigned on 9 September 2021, with president-elect Clement Lau immediately succeeding her.)
- 2021-22 Clement Lau
- 2023 Ann Gray
- 2024 Tina Paillet
- 2025 Justin Sullivan
- 2025 Nicholas Maclean OBE RD (acting president) (Note: Just over two months after taking office, Sullivan stepped down in March 2025 due to his involvement in a legal dispute over a £32m moth-infested mansion. President-elect Nick Maclean took over temporarily.)

== Administration ==
RICS headquarters is in London, with its main support functions in Birmingham. There are regional offices in the United Kingdom, across mainland Europe, in China, Singapore, Australia, the Middle East, Sub-Saharan Africa, North America and Brazil.

== Guidance ==
=== BCIS ===
BCIS, the Building Cost Information Service, was established in 1962 and provides independent cost and price information to the construction industry and others needing comprehensive, accurate and independent data. It was spun out of RICS in 2022, becoming an independent company.

=== Isurv ===
Isurv is an online information service for expertise in natural and built environments. Launched by the RICS in September 2003, it provides insight from verified legal experts and industry practitioners relating to construction.

=== Rental valuation of public houses, bars, restaurants and nightclubs in England and Wales ===
The primary RICS professional guidance on this subject is covered at VPGA 4 Valuation. It provides practical assistance to valuers dealing with public houses which are valued and assessed in a completely different way than other commercial businesses.

Public houses are valued by the profits method of valuation, often referred to as Fair Maintainable Trade Or Turnover (FMT). The FMT method applies to tens of thousands of commercial properties in England and Wales and is the basis of rateable valuation by the Valuation Office Agency, who also follow this method. RICS guidance ('The Red Book') emphasises that a valuer specialising in such valuations are regularly involved in the market, as practical knowledge of the factors affecting the market is essential to analysis of comparable transactions.

=== SMM ===
The Standard Method of Measurement (SMM) published by the RICS consisted of classification tables and rules of measurement, allowing use of a uniform basis for measuring building works. It was first published in 1922, superseding a Scottish Standard Method of Measurement which had been published in 1915. Its seventh edition (SMM7) was first published in 1988 and revised in 1998. SMM7 was replaced by the New Rules of Measurement, volume 2 (NRM2), which were published in April 2012 by the RICS Quantity Surveying and Construction Professional Group and became operational on 1 January 2013. NRM2 has been in general use since July 2013.

SMM7 was accompanied by the Code of Procedure for the Measurement of Building Works (the SMM7 Measurement Code). Whilst SMM7 could have a contractual status within a project, for example in the JCT Standard form of Building Contract), the Measurement Code was not mandatory.

NRM2 Is the second of three component parts within the NRM suite:

- NRM1 – Order of cost estimating and cost planning for capital building works
- NRM2 – Detailed measurement for building works
- NRM3 – Order of cost estimating and cost planning for building maintenance works.

=== Commercial leases ===
A commercial lease code was published in 2020 as part of an RICS professional statement to promote best practice, replacing a code of practice for commercial leases first developed in 1995, with updates issued in 2002 and 2007. The initial code was seen as an attempt to balance relationships between landlords and premises renters, especially in the small business sector. The code adopted in 2020 reflected a perception that "the lettings market became more evenly balanced between landlords and tenants" by this time. The code operates as a professional statement with mandatory obligations applicable to RICS members and regulated firms, and separately as a "good practice" document without the mandatory requirements, for use outside a professional context.

== Charitable works ==
Lionheart is the benevolent fund for past and present RICS members and their families. The charity was established in 1899 and provides financial support, health and well-being packages, and work-related counselling and befriending support. RICS also supports the Chartered Surveyors Training Trust, which helps young people enter the profession through apprenticeships; Charity Property Help, which provides property advice to charities and voluntary organisations, and The Chartered Surveyors' Voluntary Service (CSVS), a registered charity providing free property advice to people who would otherwise struggle to access professional assistance.

== See also ==
- Chartered Institution of Civil Engineering Surveyors
- Remote Sensing and Photogrammetry Society
