= Institute of Real Estate Management =

International professional association of real estate managers

Institute of Real Estate Management of the National Association of Realtors
- Formation: July 10, 1934; 92 years ago
- Tax ID no.: 36-6214767
- Legal status: 501(c)(6) business league
- Headquarters: Chicago, Illinois, United States
- Methods: Conducts courses in property management; convenes national meetings of property managers; and develops and publishes textbooks, reports, journals, and related products.
- President: Mindy Gronbeck, CPM, CCIM
- Chief Executive Officer: Zack Wahlquist,FASAE, CAE, RCE
- Affiliations: National Association of Realtors, Institute of Real Estate Management Foundation
- Revenue: $12,204,087 (2017)
- Expenses: $11,967,143 (2017)
- Employees: 80 (2017)
- Volunteers: 554 (2017)
- Website: www.irem.org

Institute of Real Estate Management (officially, Institute of Real Estate Management of the National Association of Realtors) is an international professional association of real estate managers. An affiliate of the National Association of Realtors, the IREM is made up of real estate management professionals, and is the only organization serving both the multifamily and commercial sectors.

IREM offers trainings and courses in property management and administers a number of professional credentials to real estate professionals including: Certified Property Manager (CPM), Accredited Residential Manager (ARM) Accredited Commercial Manager (ACoM), and Accredited Management Organization (AMO).

IREM's trainings have provided updated information for real estate managers responding to new challenges—including those posed by COVID-19. Its Pandemic Guide has been a resource for real estate managers globally.

IREM was founded in Chicago in 1933.

As of April 2020, the Institute of Real Estate Management membership included almost 20,000 individual members and 1,108 corporate members.

== See also ==
- National Association of Realtors
