= List of people from Ilkley =

This is a list of notable people who were born in or near, or have been residents of Ilkley, England.

- Donald Baverstock (1924–1995), TV executive (former resident)
- Gillian Baverstock (1931–2007), writer and daughter of Enid Blyton (former resident)
- Martyn Bedford, novelist
- Gordon J. Brand, professional golfer
- Don Brennan (deceased), England cricketer
- Jilly Cooper, novelist (former resident)
- John Cunliffe, children's novelist and television (deceased) presenter
- John Gordon Dower, architect and leading light to create the National Parks of England and Wales
- Jeremy Dyson, author, musician and screenwriter
- Anthony Earnshaw (deceased), anarchist and surrealist author and illustrator
- Anita Ganeri, author
- Gomez, British rock band (resident during the production of their Mercury Music Prize-winning album Bring It On)
- Georgie Henley, actress
- Kim-Joy Hewlett, baker and cookbook author
- The Rt Revd. and Rt Hon. David Hope, Baron Hope of Thornes (formerly Archbishop of York)
- Clive Hornby, actor
- Tom Jackson (deceased), trade unionist
- Mark James, professional golfer
- Pat Kirkwood (deceased), musical theatre actress, lived and died at Glen Rosa, Kitwood House
- Marie Walker Last (1917-2017) artist
- Sir Edward Maufe (deceased), architect
- Albert Modley (deceased), comedian
- Colin Montgomerie, professional golfer (former resident)
- William Pope, chaplain at Middleton Lodge, Ilkley, for 22 years. During that period he was instrumental in organising the building of the Church of the Sacred Heart, Ilkley, and the associated school buildings.
- Alan Silson, musician and lead guitarist of rock band Smokie
- Thomas Bowman Stephenson, Methodist minister and founder of National Children's Home
- Alan Titchmarsh, celebrity gardener (former resident)
- Catherine Tolson (1892–1924), English nurse and suffragette
- Donald Wade, Baron Wade (deceased), Liberal Party Member of Parliament
- Richard Whiteley (deceased), television presenter and journalist
- Ricky Wilson, lead singer of rock band Kaiser Chiefs (former resident)
- Arthur Wood (deceased), England cricketer
