= The Virtual Disappearance of Miriam =

- Author: Martyn Bedford
- Publication date: 2000
- Publication place: United Kingdom
- Media type: Adobe Flash

The Virtual Disappearance of Miriam, created in 2000 by Martyn Bedford and Andy Campbell as part of the Ilkley Literature Festival, is an example of electronic literature with a linear narrative that uses the digital medium, to aid the process of storytelling. It was first published on the Dreaming Methods website, then in the journal The New River in 2010, and it is now archived in The NEXT Museum.

== About the work ==
The reader interacts with the narrative through the use of links and the four different segments of the narrative, "Missing You Already", "House of Sam", "Playing the Male Lead", and "Miriam". The reader moves through these linear stories following Luther's experience to find his missing girlfriend, Miriam. In each of the stories, Luther is faced with a digital environment, for example a computer game and Quentin Tarantino's movie set. These digital environments correspond to the digital medium of the text itself, and convey Miriam as a character who has disappeared virtually.

There are many different physical and material elements that make up the materiality of the narrative, such as images, design, colour, font, and audio.

In 2012 the work was experimentally converted to HTML5 by Andy Campbell using Google Swiffy allowing it to be viewed on devices which do not support the Adobe Flash Player plug-in.

== Reception ==
This short visual piece has been analysed in several scholarly works.
