= Wharfedale Brewery =

Brewery in Ilkley, England

Coordinates: 53.92645°N 1.82533°W

Wharfedale Brewery Limited
- Industry: Alcoholic beverage
- Predecessor: 1765, 2003
- Founded: 2012
- Founder: Wharfedale Brewery Ltd Shareholders
- Headquarters: Ilkley, West Yorkshire, England
- Products: Beer
- Owner: Wharfedale Brewery Ltd
- Website: http://www.wharfedalebrewery.com/

Wharfedale Brewery is a brewery situated in Ilkley in Wharfedale, West Yorkshire, England, on the edge of the Yorkshire Dales National Park. Two, now defunct, breweries in Yorkshire have previously used the Wharfedale name; first in Wetherby in the 1756 and again in Grassington in 2003. The name was resurrected for a third time, further down the River Wharfe, in 2012 by a group of 16 real ale enthusiasts, many of whom are former chairmen of Ilkley & District Round Table.

== History ==
According to The Journal of The Brewery History Society, Wharfedale Brewery began life as Wetherby Brewery in 1756 when it was established by brewer, maltster, and farmer John Rhodes. When John Rhodes died in 1780 he was succeeded in the brewery by his eldest son Gregory and his second son Quentin and the two of them guided the fortunes of the brewery well into the nineteenth century.

Quentin Rhodes, an important local businessman, made his fortune selling beer to many of the town's 15 pubs. His portrait still hangs in Wetherby Town Hall. In 1892 the brewery was sold by Rhodes' nephew Mr. Coates, solicitor and clerk to the Board of Guardians, and became known as Braime's Brewery before a further name change to Wharfedale Brewery. The brewery closed during the First World War and later became Oxley's Mineral Water factory in the inter-war years. In the 1950s the building, located in the town's market square, was demolished and replaced by a new bus station and depot.

In 2003 the Wharfedale Brewery name was brought back to life in Hetton near Grassington and opened by the Duke of Kent. Owners Steve Blizzard and David Aynesworth (star of Yorkshire Television's "Yorkshire's Perfect Pint"), produced a number of award winning beers under the "Folly Ales" brand name and their most famous customer was Madonna who bought quantities of the beer for a Weekend Of Folly event. In 2007 the company was dissolved for personal reasons as Blizzard returned to his native U.S. Aynesworth continues to own and run the Craven Arms public house in Appletreewick in North Yorkshire.

2012 saw the third incarnation of Wharfedale Brewery as an integral part of Ilkley's first brew pub. A consortium of local businessmen set up a company called Wharfedale Brewery Limited and invested a six figure sum in redeveloping the former Albert Inn on Church Street, a Grade II listed property built in 1709. The pub, which is one of Ilkley's oldest buildings and is mentioned in Sir Nikolaus Pevsner’s “Buildings of England” chronicles for its architectural importance, was renamed the Flying Duck and a microbrewery was incorporated into a barn at the back.

In December 2012 award-winning brewer Stewart Ross resigned as a director of Ilkley Brewery, a company he founded in 2008, to become a brewing consultant to Wharfedale Brewery and advisor to head brewer Michael Allan.

== Real Ale Trail ==
In May 2014 Wharfedale Brewery launched "The Ales Way" - Wharfedale's Ale Trail which takes in 15 pubs throughout Wharfedale between Ilkley and Hubberholme. The Ales Way is publicised by a free information leaflet which is available from all participating pubs, the brewery, local tourist information centres and www.thealesway.com website. Each time a pub is visited and a pint of Wharfedale Brewery beer is purchased, a souvenir card is stamped. Once sufficient stamps have been collected, the souvenir card can be exchanged for a t-shirt and brewery presentation pack. Participants can also choose to be entered into a "Hall of Fame".

== Beers ==
The new brewery, currently produces three cask ales and pasteurised bottled ales, Wharfedale cask ales are sold predominantly in the Flying Duck, the brewery's brewery tap and in local hostelries throughout Wharfedale. The bottled beers are available for purchase via the brewery's website, direct from the brewery and in shops and restaurants throughout Yorkshire.

- Wharfedale Blonde (3.9% ABV)
- Wharfedale Best (4.0% ABV). Launched as a "festival ale" for the Wheatley Beer Festival in Ben Rhydding in May 2013.
- Wharfedale Black (3.7% ABV)
