= Martyn Bedford =

British novelist and literary critic (born 1959)

- Born: 1959 (age 66–67)
- Education: University of East Anglia
- Occupations: Novelist; literary critic

Martyn Bedford (born 1959) is a British novelist, literary critic and author of electronic literature.

== Life and career ==
He is an alumnus of the University of East Anglia.

The first twelve years of Martyn Bedford's writing career were spent as a journalist on regional newspapers, notably at the Bradford Telegraph and Argus.

His initial book Acts of Revision won the Yorkshire Post “Best First Work” Award. He later became the director of the novel writing programme at the University of Manchester, and is fiction critic for the Literary Review. Currently, Bedford teaches the Creative Writing module at Leeds Trinity University.

Bedford's digital narrative The Virtual Disappearance of Miriam, which was written with Andy Campbell in 2000 and published first on the Dreaming Methods website and then in The New River in 2010, is now archived in The NEXT Museum, an archive for electronic literature. This short visual piece has three possible endings, and has been analysed in several scholarly works.

In 2008–10, he was Academic Writer-in-Residence, Royal Literary Fund Fellow. Bedford lives in Ilkley, West Yorkshire, with his wife and two daughters.

== Awards and honours ==
- 2011: Costa Book Awards, shortlist, Flip

== Bibliography ==
- Acts of Revision (Doubleday, 1996)
- Exit, Orange & Red (Bantam, 1997)
- The Houdini Girl (Random House, 1999)
- Black Cat (Viking, 2000)
- The Virtual Disappearance of Miriam (digital narrative, 2000)
- The Island of Lost Souls (Bloomsbury, 2006)
- Flip (Walker, 2011)
- Never Ending (Walker, 2014)
- Twenty Questions for Gloria (Walker, 2016)
