= Listed buildings in Ilkley =

Ilkley is a civil parish in the metropolitan borough of the City of Bradford, West Yorkshire, England. It contains 80 listed buildings that are recorded in the National Heritage List for England. Of these, three are listed at Grade I, the highest of the three grades, three are at Grade II*, the middle grade, and the others are at Grade II, the lowest grade. The parish contains the town of Ilkley, the adjacent village of Ben Rhydding, and the surrounding countryside. By the early 19th century Ilkley was a small village at an intersection of roads, and it then grew as a spa town, before later becoming a dormitory town for Bradford and Leeds. Most of the listed buildings are houses, cottages and associated strictures, farmhouses and farm buildings. The other listed buildings include churches, chapels and associated structures, schools, milestones and mileposts, a bath house, hotels, a railway station, a post box, a town hall, library and theatre, memorial gardens containing two war memorials, a lido, and a mural.

== Key ==
Grade	Criteria
I	Buildings of exceptional interest, sometimes considered to be internationally important
II*	Particularly important buildings of more than special interest
II	Buildings of national importance and special interest

== Buildings ==
Name and location	Photograph	Date	Notes	Grade
All Saints' Church; 53.92646°N 1.82424°W		14th century	The oldest part of the church is the nave, the tower and aisles date from the 15th century, and the church was restored in 1860–61. It is built in sandstone with slate roofs, and consists of a nave with a clerestory, north and south aisles, a south porch, a chancel with a north chapel, vestries and offices, and a west tower. The tower is in Perpendicular style and has three stages, diagonal buttresses, a stair turret, a three-light west window, a clock face on the south side, and an embattled parapet with corner pinnacles. The east window has five lights.	II*
Manor House; 53.92683°N 1.82476°W		16th century (or earlier)	A large house, later a museum, it is in stone with a stone slab roof. The house is mainly in two storeys, and consists of a hall range, two gabled wings to the right, and a three-storey gable cross-wing to the left. The doorway has a pointed arch and a plain surround. The windows in the two right gabled wings and in the ground floor of the hall range are mullioned and transomed with round arched lights, and in the ground floor of the hall range and the cross-wing they are mullioned with flat-headed lights.	I
Myddleton Lodge; 53.93761°N 1.83405°W		16th century	A large house in stone, with a stone slab roof, two storeys, a basement and an attic. The main block has a front of three bays and two gables with crocketed finials. Steps with railings lead up to a central doorway that has a rusticated arch, and above it is an oriel window. These are flanked by mullioned and transomed windows, and in the gables are three-light mullioned windows with round-headed lights. To the left of the main block is a turret, and further to the left is a chapel added in about 1830. To the right is a 19th-century wing.	I
High Stead Farm House; 53.91213°N 1.78530°W	—	1596	A stone farmhouse with a timber framed core that was later altered, it has a stone slab roof and two storeys. The windows are mullioned, those in the earlier part of the house with semicircular-headed lights. The lintel above the south doorway is inscribed with initials and the date.	II
Grange Farm House; 53.93832°N 1.81246°W	—	Early 17th century (possible)	A stone farmhouse with a stone slab roof and two storeys. In the centre of the north front is a reversed L-shaped staircase mullioned and transomed window, and the other windows are mullioned with some mullions removed.	II
Low Hall; 53.93272°N 1.82633°W	—	Early 17th century (probable)	A stone house incorporating earlier material and later altered, it is in stone with a stone slab roof, and has two storeys. In the centre is a two-storey porch containing an arched entrance, and above is a six-light mullioned and transomed window, slightly projecting, on ornamental corbels. This is flanked by mullioned windows with two lights in the upper floor and three lights in the ground floor.	II*
Hollin Hall Farm House; 53.92741°N 1.84781°W	—	Early 17th century	A stone farmhouse with a stone slab roof. There are two storeys, and the windows are mullioned and transomed.	II
Old Grammar School; 53.92630°N 1.82808°W		1637	The former grammar school is in stone and has a stone slab roof with gables and kneelers. There is one storey and two bays. In the centre is a doorway with chamfered jambs and an arched lintel, flanked by four-light mullioned windows. The windows elsewhere are also mullioned.	II
Gibb Field Farm House; 53.91653°N 1.79156°W	—	17th century (probable)	A stone farmhouse with widely spaced gutter blocks and a stone slab roof. There are two storeys and three bays. On the south front are three casement windows, and a panel with canted reveals, and the chimney is very tall.	II
Mount Stead; 53.91385°N 1.78428°W	—	17th century	A stone house with a stone slab roof and two storeys. On the front is a two-storey porch, gabled with kneelers and finials, containing a doorway with a dated lintel, above which is a five-light window. Flanking the porch are low projections, and the windows have chamfered mullions.	II
Wheatley Cottage; 53.92337°N 1.79868°W	—	17th century	The cottage is in stone with a stone slab roof and two storeys. The windows on the front are mullioned, and the doorway to the right has an initialled and dated lintel.	II
Outbuildings enclosing farmyard, Wheatley Grange; 53.92844°N 1.79273°W	—	17th century (probable)	The outbuildings enclose the farmyard on the north, west and south sides. They are in stone with stone slab roofs, and have one storey. The buildings contain doors and windows of plain design.	II
Wheatley Hall; 53.92535°N 1.79723°W		17th century	A stone house with a stone slab roof and two storeys. The windows in the ground floor are mullioned and transomed, and in the upper floor they are mullioned.	II
Milestone, Hardings Lane; 53.93800°N 1.83042°W		17th to 18th century	The milestone is by a road junction, and consists of a rectangular block of stone about 1 metre (3 ft 3 in) high. It is inscribed with pointing hands and distances.	II
Milestone, Keighley Road; 53.91694°N 1.83415°W		17th to 18th century	The milestone by the side of the road consists of a stone obelisk about 1 metre (3 ft 3 in) high. It is inscribed with pointing hands and the distances to Ilkley and Keighley.	II
Outbuilding next to Netherwood House; 53.92590°N 1.86457°W	—	1702	The outbuilding is in stone, and has a stone slab roof with coped gables and kneelers. There are two storeys and a cellar. The building contains a coach doorway with a segmental head, and mullioned windows containing sashes. In the south gable end external steps lead to an upper floor doorway, and there is another doorway below. In the gable apex are three small openings with moulded sills.	II
16 Church Street; 53.92642°N 1.82536°W		1709	A house, later used for other purposes, it is in stone with a stone slab roof. There are two storeys, a double-depth plan, and two bays. In the centre is a doorway with a chamfered surround and a dated Tudor arched lintel, and above it is an upright oval window. Flanking these are four-light mullioned windows in each floor, and stepped above the ground floor openings is a continuous hood mould.	II
Box Tree; 53.92613°N 1.82573°W		Early 18th century	A house, later extended, and used as a restaurant, it is in stone with quoins, and a stone slab roof with kneelers. There are two storeys, three bays, and a gabled extension on the left. The central doorway has a moulded architrave and a steep pediment, and is flanked by inserted rectangular bay windows. Above the doorway is a single-light window and to the sides are two-light mullioned windows.	II
Castle House; 53.92692°N 1.82562°W		c. 1740	A stone house in a terrace, with quoins, string courses, and a stone slab roof. There are two storeys and three bays. The central doorway has a Gibbs surround, the keystone and the tympanum of the pediment vermiculated. To the right is a smaller doorway with a simpler surround, and the window above the doorway also has a Gibbs surround. The other windows have architraves.	II
4–6 Church Street; 53.92640°N 1.82482°W		c. 1750	The building is in stone and has a stone slab roof with coped gables and kneelers. There are two storeys, three bays, and a single-bay extension to the right. In the ground floor, from the left, is a passage entry with a segmental arch, a shop window, a doorway with a cornice, and a bow window. The upper floor contains a three-light mullioned window above the archway, and to the right are two sash windows. In the extension are two sash windows in the upper floor, and a projecting shop front below.	II
12 Church Street; 53.92640°N 1.82515°W	—	18th century (probable)	A stone shop with a stone slab roof and two storeys. In the ground floor, on the left, is a wide opening with slab jambs and a lintel, to its right is a modern doorway, and further to the right is a bow window. The upper floor contains two windows, the left window the larger.	II
18 Church Street; 53.92642°N 1.82547°W	—	18th century (probable)	A stone house, later used for other purposes, with shaped gutter brackets, and a stone slab roof with coped gables. There are two storeys and three bays. The near-central doorway and the windows are modern.	II
19 and 21 Church Street; 53.92621°N 1.82480°W		18th century	A pair of stone cottages, later combined and used for other purposes. There are two storeys, two bays, and a rear extension. In the ground floor are two 19th-century shop fronts, with pilasters, and each has an entablature and a moulded cornice. Between them is a doorway, and to the right is a blocked passage entry with an inserted window. The upper floor contains two tripartite windows, the middle light taller and wider, and to the right is a smaller sash window.	II
Barn southwest of Gibb Field Farm House; 53.91654°N 1.79188°W	—	18th century (probable)	A stone barn with gutter blocks, a stone slab roof, and two storeys. It contains a tall opening with a segmental head and a window to the left. On the right is an outbuilding extending forward.	II
Annexe, Grange Farm House; 53.93832°N 1.81227°W	—	18th century (possible)	The building is attached to the farmhouse, and is in stone with a stone slab roof and two storeys. Steps lead up to the doorway, and the building contains one casement window.	II
Barn north of Grange Farmyard; 53.93859°N 1.81220°W	—	18th century	A stone barn with corner quoins and a stone slab roof. There are large openings in the north and south sides, with quoined surrounds, depressed heads, and keystones.	II
Barn north of High Stead Farm House; 53.91247°N 1.78538°W	—	18th century (probable)	The barn is in stone with a stone slab roof. There is a lean-to extension along the south side, and double doors under a wooden lintel on the north side.	II
Outbuilding, Hollin Hall Farm; 53.92714°N 1.84697°W	—	18th century (probable)	The outbuilding is in stone, and has a stone slab roof with coped gables. There are two storeys and an extension to the east. The windows are modern replacements.	II
Moor Cottage; 53.92112°N 1.82173°W	—	18th century	A house in painted stone with paired gutter blocks and a stone slate roof. The entrance front has a pediment gable with an oculus in the tympanum. There are two storeys and three bays. The central doorway has a fanlight, it is flanked by canted bay windows, and in the upper floor are sash windows. At the rear are two two-storey bay windows.	II
Mount Stead Cottage; 53.91365°N 1.78467°W	—	18th century (probable)	A stone cottage that has a stone slab roof with kneelers on the south gable. There is one storey and an attic, and a lean-to extension to the east. The windows are sashes, and one window has a mullion.	II
Wall running north from Mount Stead Cottage; 53.91376°N 1.78460°W	—	18th century (probable)	The wall runs north from the cottage towards Mount Stead. It is in stone and about 7 feet (2.1 m) high.	II
Gazebo, Myddleton Lodge; 53.93732°N 1.83372°W	—	18th century	The gazebo to the southeast of the house is in stone. It has a square plan, and a pyramidal roof of stone slabs. The gazebo contains a doorway on the west side with an architrave of moulded plaster, and elsewhere are modern vertical windows.	II
Netherwood House; 53.92576°N 1.86483°W	—	18th century	The house, which has been enlarged, is in stone with quoins, a parapet, and a hipped stone slab roof. There are two storeys and four bays. In the centre is a doorway with pilasters, a dated lintel, and a pediment with initials in the tympanum. This is flanked by two-story semi-hexagonal bay windows. In the left bay is a two-storey canted bay window.	II
House northeast of Netherwood House; 53.92595°N 1.86443°W	—	18th century (probable)	A stone house that has a stone slab roof with coped gables and kneelers. There are two storeys, a rear extension, and a short extension to the left. The original part has a symmetrical front and contains a central doorway, and three-light windows with the central light higher.	II
Outbuilding abutting House northeast of Netherwood House; 53.92594°N 1.86396°W	—	18th century (probable)	The outbuilding is in stone with a stone slab roof and two storeys. On the front are four windows and a doorway with a lunette above, and at the rear is a segmental-headed doorway.	II
Wheatley Grange; 53.92845°N 1.79237°W	—	18th century	A stone farmhouse with quoins, and a stone slab roof with coped gables and kneelers. There are two storeys and a symmetrical front of three bays. The central doorway has chamfered jambs, a fanlight, and a straight moulded hood. The windows are sashes with bracketed sills, and at the rear is a round-headed stair window.	II
Barn south of Wheatley Grange; 53.92823°N 1.79247°W	—	18th century (probable)	The barn is in stone with a stone slab roof. There are two storeys and an extension to the north. In the north gable end are two fixed windows in each floor.	II
Walling to drive, Wheatley Grange; 53.92867°N 1.79201°W	—	18th century (probable)	The walling is in stone with semicircular coping and is about 5 feet (1.5 m) high. It forms curves flanking the entrance, and runs along the west side of the drive almost to the house.	II
White Farm; 53.92198°N 1.83840°W	—	18th century (probable)	A house in painted stone, possibly with some brickwork, it has a slate roof, two storeys and an attic. The main range has three bays, a central doorway and porch, and sash windows. To the north is a gabled wing.	II
White Wells; 53.91692°N 1.82178°W		c. 1791	A bath house on Ilkley Moor, consisting of four sections of unequal heights, built in stone with stone slab roofs. The original buildings consisted of a two-storey section containing changing rooms, flanked by single-storey wings containing the baths, and without roofs. The baths were elliptical, about 8 feet (2.4 m) long, with steps at one end, hewn out of the rock, and fed by springs. In the 19th century they were roofed, and in 1829 another range was added, containing stables and waiting rooms.	II
14 Church Street; 53.92641°N 1.82523°W	—	c. 1800 (probable)	A stone shop with moulded gutter blocks, a stone slab roof, and two storeys. In the ground floor is a modern doorway and a bow window to the right, and the upper floor contains a sash window.	II
12 West View; 53.92126°N 1.82179°W	—	c. 1800 (probable)	A house at the end of a terrace, it is stone, with paired gutter blocks, and a stone slab roof with coped gables and kneelers. There are two storeys and a symmetrical front of three bays. The central doorway has half-columns, a fanlight, a frieze with foliage decoration, and an open pediment. It is flanked by later bay windows, and in the upper floor are sash windows.	II
Front garden railings, 12 West View; 53.92124°N 1.82198°W	—	c. 1800 (probable)	The railings on the north, south and west sides of the front garden are in iron. Alternate rods are spiralled, and they are otherwise plain.	II
Ilkley Hall; 53.92203°N 1.81988°W	—	c. 1825	A stone house with moulded eaves and a stone slab roof. There are two storeys, a front of three bays, and seven bays on the west front with a lower extension. To the left is a single-storey extension in the form of a canted bay, and a further single-storey bay to the left of that. In the centre of the front is a porch with pilasters, an entablature and a pediment, and the windows are sashes in moulded architraves.	II
Lister's Arms Hotel; 53.92601°N 1.82638°W	—	1825	The former hotel is in stone with pilaster strips at the ends, sill bands, and a hipped slate roof. There are three storeys, five bays, the outer bays slightly recessed, and flanking two-storey two-bay extensions. Steps lead up to the central round-arched doorway that has a fanlight, impost blocks and a keystone, and it is flanked by carriage lamps. The windows are sashes, and to the left of the doorway is a wide wooden canted bay window.	II
Former Stables, Lister's Arms Hotel; 53.92587°N 1.82707°W	—	1825 (probable)	The former stables form two sides of a courtyard. They are in stone with a hipped slate roof, and have two storeys. In the centre of the east range is a pediment-like gable. The stables contain four carriage entries, and over the centre are round-headed windows flanked by octagonal windows.	II
3 and 4 West View; 53.92215°N 1.82195°W	—	Early Victorian	A pair of similar but not identical houses in a terrace. They are in stone, each with a moulded eaves cornice, No. 3 also with eaves coping, and slate roofs with coped gables. They have two storeys, and each house has three bays, a central doorway with Tuscan pilasters, a fanlight, and a moulded straight hood. The windows are sashes.	II
Railings and gates, 3 and 4 West View; 53.92214°N 1.82218°W	—	Early Victorian	The gate at the entrance to the gardens has moulded decorated finials, as do the railings of the garden of No. 3. The railings of No. 4 have spear finials.	II
6 and 7 West View; 53.92184°N 1.82190°W	—	Early Victorian (probable)	A pair of houses in a terrace, they are in stone, with two storeys, and two bays each. The doorways have moulded straight hoods, and between them is a passage doorway with a fanlight and a rusticated arch on corbels.	II
Railings and gate, 6 and 7 West View; 53.92182°N 1.82213°W	—	Early Victorian (probable)	At the entrance to the garden are gate piers in Gothic style. They are flanked by low railings with dart finials.	II
Outbuilding, Grange Farm; 53.93850°N 1.81261°W	—	19th century (probable)	The outbuilding abutting the farmhouse is in stone, and has two parts. The south part has two storeys and a stone slab roof, and the north part has one storey and a slate roof.	II
Milepost near Hollin Hall; 53.92817°N 1.85172°W		19th century	The milepost is on the southeast side of Skipton Road (A65 road). It is in cast iron on a stone post, and has a triangular section and a rounded top. On the top is inscribed "SKIPTON & OTLEY ROAD" and "ILKLEY", and on the sides are the distances to Ilkley, Otley, Bolton Bridge, and Skipton.	II
Milepost at junction with Bolton Bridge Road; 53.92633°N 1.82924°W		19th century	The milepost is on the south side of Skipton Road (A65 road) at its junction with Bolton Bridge Road (B6382 road). It is in cast iron on a stone post, and has a triangular section and a rounded top. On the top is inscribed "SKIPTON & OTLEY ROAD" and "ILKLEY", and on the sides are the distances to Ilkley, Otley, Bolton Bridge, and Skipton.	II
Milepost opposite 256 Leeds Road; 53.92915°N 1.80641°W		19th century	The milepost is on the northwest side of Leeds Road (A65 road). It is in cast iron on a stone post, and has a triangular section and a rounded top. On the top is inscribed "SKIPTON & OTLEY ROAD" and "ILKLEY", and on the sides are the distances to Ilkley, Otley, and Skipton.	II
Wells House; 53.92003°N 1.82622°W		1854–56	Originally a hydropathic establishment, and later incorporated into Ilkley College, it was designed by Cuthbert Brodrick in Italianate style. The building is in stone with corner pilasters and a rusticated ground floor, above which are double string courses, and at the top is a moulded frieze with paired brackets, a cornice and a pierced balustrade. There are three storeys, a rectangular plan, and symmetrical fronts, the outer two bays on each front projecting, with an attic and turrets with finials at the corners. The windows in the ground floor have segmental heads, in the middle floor they have round heads and vermiculated surrounds, the top floor windows have flat heads, grooved pilaster strips, and decorative pendants, and in the attics are round-headed windows.	II
Crescent Hotel; 53.92595°N 1.82316°W		c. 1860	The hotel is on a corner site and is curved. It is built in stone, with sill bands, a bracketed eaves cornice, and a slate roof. There are three storeys, six bays to the left of the entrance bay, and four bays to its right. At the entrance is a porch with two pairs of Tuscan columns, an entablature and a modillioned cornice. The doorway is round-headed with a fanlight, and the porch is flanked by narrow round-headed windows. Above the porch are paired windows with flat hoods. The other windows in the ground floor have round-arched heads, moulded architraves, and keystones. In the middle floor they have segmental heads, moulded architraves and keystones, and in the top floor they have flat heads and plain surrounds.	II
Outbuilding, Crescent Hotel; 53.92597°N 1.82235°W	—	c. 1860 or earlier	The outbuilding is in stone, and has a stone slab roof with coped gables. There are two storeys, and it contains a wide coach doorway with a segmental relieving arch above, a doorway, a window, and modern garage entrances. In the upper floor is a central roundel with keystones, a casement window, and a doorway.	II
Ilkley railway station 53.92467°N 1.82203°W		1865	The station building is in stone with a bracketed cornice and a hipped slate roof. There is a single storey, with a transverse block in the centre projecting at both ends. This is flanked by five-bay ranges containing sash windows, with projections at the ends. In the centre the entrance is in the form of a Venetian window, the entrance flanked by Tuscan columns and pilasters, and above it is a semicircular window with a keystone. In the end projections are pilasters and entablatures, and inside the station the platforms have canopies.	II
Postbox; 53.93036°N 1.82341°W		1866–79	The post box was designed by John Penfold and has a hexagonal plan.	II
United Reformed Church; 53.92433°N 1.82463°W		1868–69	The church, designed by J. P. Pritchett junior, is mainly Early English in style. It is built in stone with slate roofs, and consists of a nave, gabled north and south aisles, an octagonal projection at the southeast, and a steeple incorporating a porch at the northeast corner. At each end of the church is a five-light window with Decorated tracery.	II
All Saints First School; 53.92692°N 1.82042°W		1871–72	The school and school house were later extended and altered. They are in stone with Welsh slate roofs, in Early English style, and have an irregular cruciform plan. The hall range has a single storey and a gabled wing to the left and a gabled porch to the right. At the south end is a gable with a five-light window and a sexfoil round window above, and on the north side is a tower porch with a pyramidal roof. The school house has two storeys, two bays and an L-shaped plan. Enclosing the site is a boundary wall with three gates and round-headed gate piers.	II
Westwood Lodge; 53.91909°N 1.82966°W		1875	A stone house, later a hotel, with slate roofs, two storeys, and attics. In the east front is a four-storey tower with a truncated pyramidal roof, containing a gabled porch in Gothic style with colonnettes. To the left is a projecting gabled bay. This contains a rectangular bay window with a decorative parapet, and the gable has pierced bargeboards. Further to the left is a single-storey nine-bay conservatory with colonnettes between the bays, a band of foliage at the level of the capitals, a frieze of cusped roundels, and a glass roof.	II
Northern Chapel, Ilkley Cemetery; 53.93099°N 1.81451°W		1876–78	The chapel is in sandstone with dressings in gritstone, and a roof of green slate. At the east end is a bell tower on the left, and an entrance in a Romanesque loggia, within which is a doorway with a pointed head. The rest of the chapel is in Gothic Revival style. The tower is square with side gables and it carries a colonnade with a hexagonal spire on a circular base. At the west end is a semicircular apse with three lancet windows.	II
Southern Chapel, Ilkley Cemetery; 53.93079°N 1.81450°W	—	1876–78	The chapel is in sandstone with dressings in gritstone, and a roof of green slate. At the east end is a bell tower on the right, and an entrance in a Romanesque loggia, within which is a doorway with a pointed head. The rest of the chapel is in Gothic Revival style. The tower is square with side gables and it carries a colonnade with a hexagonal spire on a circular base. At the west end is a semicircular apse with three lancet windows.	II
St John's Flats; 53.92081°N 1.82850°W	—	1878–79	A house designed by Richard Norman Shaw, it was converted into flats in about 1955. The building is in stone, and has two and three storeys with attics and basements. In the south front facing the road are five windows, the left one modern, the next an embattled oriel window with a carved underpart, and most of the other windows are mullioned and transomed. At the east end is a doorway, now blocked, that has an almost-flat arched head, a moulded pendant swelling in the centre, and a hood mould above.	II
St Margaret's Church; 53.92129°N 1.82655°W		1878–79	The church was designed by Richard Norman Shaw in Perpendicular style. It is on a sloping site, it is built in sandstone with lead roofs, and consists of a nave with a clerestory, north and south aisles, a northwest porch, a chancel with a north chapel and a south organ chamber projecting like transepts, and vestries and a boiler room in a basement below. In the angle of the porch is a polygonal stair turret, and between the nave and the chancel is an elaborate bellcote. The west window has ten lights, and the east window has nine.	II*
Ardenlea; 53.92052°N 1.83412°W	—	1881	A large house, later used for other purposes, it is in gritstone with Westmorland slate roofs, and is in Italianate style. There are two storeys and an attic, and the windows are sashes. The east front contains a central four-storey tower, a bow window, Venetian windows in the attic, and a doorway with Doric pilasters and an entablature. On the south front is a two-storey square bay window, to the left is a stair tower, and the left corner is canted with a pyramidal roof. The north front contains two full-height bay windows, and to the right is a three-storey extension with hipped roofs and ornate iron railings on the ridge.	II
Railings, walls and gates, Ardenlea; 53.92033°N 1.83373°W	—	1881	Running along the front of the grounds is a low stone wall with curved coping on which are sections of cast iron railings interspersed with full-height walling. There are two pairs of square stone gate piers, each with a moulded base and chamfered sides, rising to an octagonal section with banding and curved tops. The uppermost section is circular with Greek key decoration, surmounted by moulded circular caps with ogee tops. The pair of piers to the right also have iron finials.	II
Church of All Saints Hall; 53.92695°N 1.81968°W		1899	The hall is in stone with a slate roof, and is in Gothic Revival style. There is one storey, a central range and two gabled wings. The right gable end contains two two-light mullioned and transomed windows, and the left gable end has a five-light window, all under ogee mouldings. In the left angle is a projecting porch with a pointed doorway, and a gable with a coat of arms in the tympanum and a crocketed finial, and flanked by small turrets with ogee caps.	II
Heathcote and associated structures 53.92460°N 1.83635°W		1906–08	A large house designed by Edwin Lutyens, it is built in Guiseley sandstone with Morley stone dressings, quoins, banded rustication, and hipped red pantile roofs. The house is symmetrical and consists of a main block of three storeys and three bays, flanked by two-storey single-bay pavilions advanced by one bay to the front and the rear of the main block. Adjoining the house is a pair of cottages, with two storeys and a central round-headed tunnel. In the grounds is a single-storey motor house and workshop, and service buildings, including a laundry, and two glasshouses. In the garden to the south of the house is a terrace with steps and canals, two garden shelters, and an entrance to the grounds with iron gates flanked by piers. At the north entrance to the grounds are stone gate piers surmounted by urns, between them are decorative iron gates, and flanking them are walls, curving towards the road and then running along it.	I
Pier by garden of 1 Heath Park; 53.92351°N 1.83613°W	—	1906–08	The pier was designed by Edwin Lutyens. It is in stone and surmounted by a banded sphere.	II
Pier by garden of 11 Heath Park; 53.92357°N 1.83635°W	—	1906–08	The pier was designed by Edwin Lutyens. It is in stone and surmounted by a banded sphere.	II
Town Hall and Library; 53.92419°N 1.82106°W		1906–08	The building is in stone with hipped slate roofs and two storeys. It consists of three blocks, the middle block recessed. In the centre is a doorway with Ionic columns and a pediment, above which is an oriel window. The outer bays contain windows, round-arched in the ground floor, and on the roof is a clock turret. The block is flanked by three-storey towers with ogee caps, and outside these is another bay with windows. The outer blocks are similar to each other, and contain a central doorway, over which is a balustrade and a three-light window rising to form a lunette. This is flanked by panels containing carved figures, and to the sides are roundels.	II
Winter Garden; 53.92428°N 1.82164°W		1906–08	A theatre to the west of the Town Hall and Library, it is in stone with a slate roof and two storeys. In the centre is a recessed entrance, above which is an oriel window, and a shaped pediment. The outer bays contain windows separated by piers. Across the front of the building is a decorated metal canopy, and on the roof is a large skylight.	II
First World War memorial 53.92465°N 1.82888°W		1922	The war memorial is in the Memorial Garden and was designed by John James Joass. It is in Portland stone and over 19 feet (5.8 m) high. The memorial consists of a square cenotaph with a slightly tapering shaft, on a square plinth, on an octagonal stepped platform with stone bollards on the corners. On the base are blind panels, and on the shaft are bronze panels with inscriptions and the names of those lost in the First World War. On the top is a decorative urn.	II
Gate piers, gates, railings and steps, Memorial Gardens; 53.92451°N 1.82846°W		1922	The structures enclosing the Memorial Gardens were designed by John James Joass. On the north, south and east sides is wrought iron fencing. At the east end is a pair of square sandstone gate piers with rounded tops and wrought iron lamp standards, and between them are wrought iron gates. There are similar gates elsewhere, and on the south side is a flight of steps with side walls and railings.	II
Ilkley Lido; 53.93200°N 1.82016°W		1934–35	This consists of an outdoor concrete swimming pool with a mushroom-shaped plan, and associated buildings. The original filtration system of the pool has been retained. The whole is set in a rectangular enclosure which contains a café and changing rooms. The café is in brick with a double hipped roof, and has windows that fold back to a raised sun terrace. On each side of the pool is a changing room that is timber framed on a concrete plinth.	II
Second World War Memorial; 53.92466°N 1.82932°W		c. 1953	The memorial buildings are in the Memorial Gardens, and consist of a shrine and flanking pavilion shelters. The shrine is in Portland stone and has three bays. In the central bay is a round-headed arch, and the outer bays are lower and recessed and contain round-arched windows; all the arches have keystones. The central arch has decorative wrought iron gates, and in the windows are wrought iron railings. The shrine stands on hexagonal plinth behind which are low walls in Portland stone. Inside the shrine is a large tablet with an inscription and the names of those lost in the Second World War. The shelters are in sandstone with hipped tile roofs. They have fronts of four bays with two bays on the sides, and contain four doorways on the front and windows on the sides and at the rear.	II
Story of Wool; 53.92764°N 1.80344°W		1968	A mural in bronze-faced glass reinforced plastic by William Mitchell on the lecture theatre of the former technical centre of the International Wool Secretariat. It depicts a stylised flock of monumental sheep on vertical panels.	II
Seven headstones, All Saints Church; 53.92640°N 1.82465°W		Undated	The seven headstones are grouped against a wall in the southwest part of the churchyard.	II
