= Ilkley Literature Festival =

Festival held in Yorkshire, England

Coordinates: 53.9270°N 1.8225°W

The Ilkley Literature Festival is a literature festival held annually in Ilkley, Yorkshire. Inaugurated in 1973 by the poet W. H. Auden and until 1988 held every two years, the festival is the oldest and largest of its type in the north of England.

== Introduction ==
The Ilkley Literature Festival is an annual event in Ilkley. Attracting many important international literary figures, its two-week programme, starting at the end of September, now features more than 250 events, which take place in a variety of venues in Ilkley and surrounding towns and villages. The festival includes events for children and young people and a festival fringe.

== History ==
In 1971 Ilkley residents Michael Dawson (then-Director of the Yorkshire Arts Association) and Peter Harland (editor of the Telegraph & Argus and Chair of the Yorkshire Arts Literature Panel) began discussing the possibility of a festival for the town. Dawson had visited Cheltenham Literature Festival and Harland suggested trying something similar in Ilkley. A seven-week postal strike with no letters to answer gave Dawson the opportunity to draw up some concrete proposals. The Yorkshire Arts Association literature panel approved the plans and promised a grant provided the urban district council made a similar commitment. On 10 February 1972, a small group met at Dawson's house in Ilkley. They included Leeds University lecturer Robin Alston and Manor House Museum curator Arthur Kitching. Donald Baverstock, Director of Programmes at YTV who lived locally, also offered to help. At a meeting at the Ilkley Town Hall in March 1972, the group organised a steering committee and local councillor, Molly Renton (the only woman) became the Chair.

The first festival, which took place in April 1973 and was opened by W. H. Auden during the last year of his life. In 1988, the festival began to be held annually. Since 2003, the festival has been directed by Rachel Feldberg.

== Notable visiting authors ==
- Kate Adie (2006)
- George Alagiah (2006)
- Maya Angelou (2005)
- Simon Armitage (2006 and 2012)
- Paddy Ashdown (2012)
- W. H. Auden (1973)
- Alan Bennett (2017)
- Melvyn Bragg (2001, 2003 and 2006)
- Richard Dawkins (2017)
- Carol Ann Duffy (2005)
- Greg Dyke (2005)
- Nick Hornby (2006)
- Ted Hughes (1975)
- Clive James (2005)
- P. D. James (2005)
- Andrew Motion (2006)
- Jenni Murray (2006)
- V. S. Naipaul (2001)
- Jeremy Paxman (2006)
- Will Self (2001)
- John Sergeant (2005)
- Ned Sherrin (2005)
- John Simpson (2006 and 2010)
- Louis Theroux (2005)
- Tim Vine (2017)
- Fay Weldon (2005)
- Benjamin Zephaniah (2004 and 2012)
- Charlotte Sleigh (2008)

== Trivia ==
- Writer and broadcaster J. B. Priestley wrote to support the first festival and said: "Ilkley is the right size for a Festival town...large enough to provide various amenities and small enough to stroll around and run into everybody."
