= Ilkley Toy Museum =

Toy museum in West Yorkshire, England

Coordinates: 53.92385°N 1.82214°W

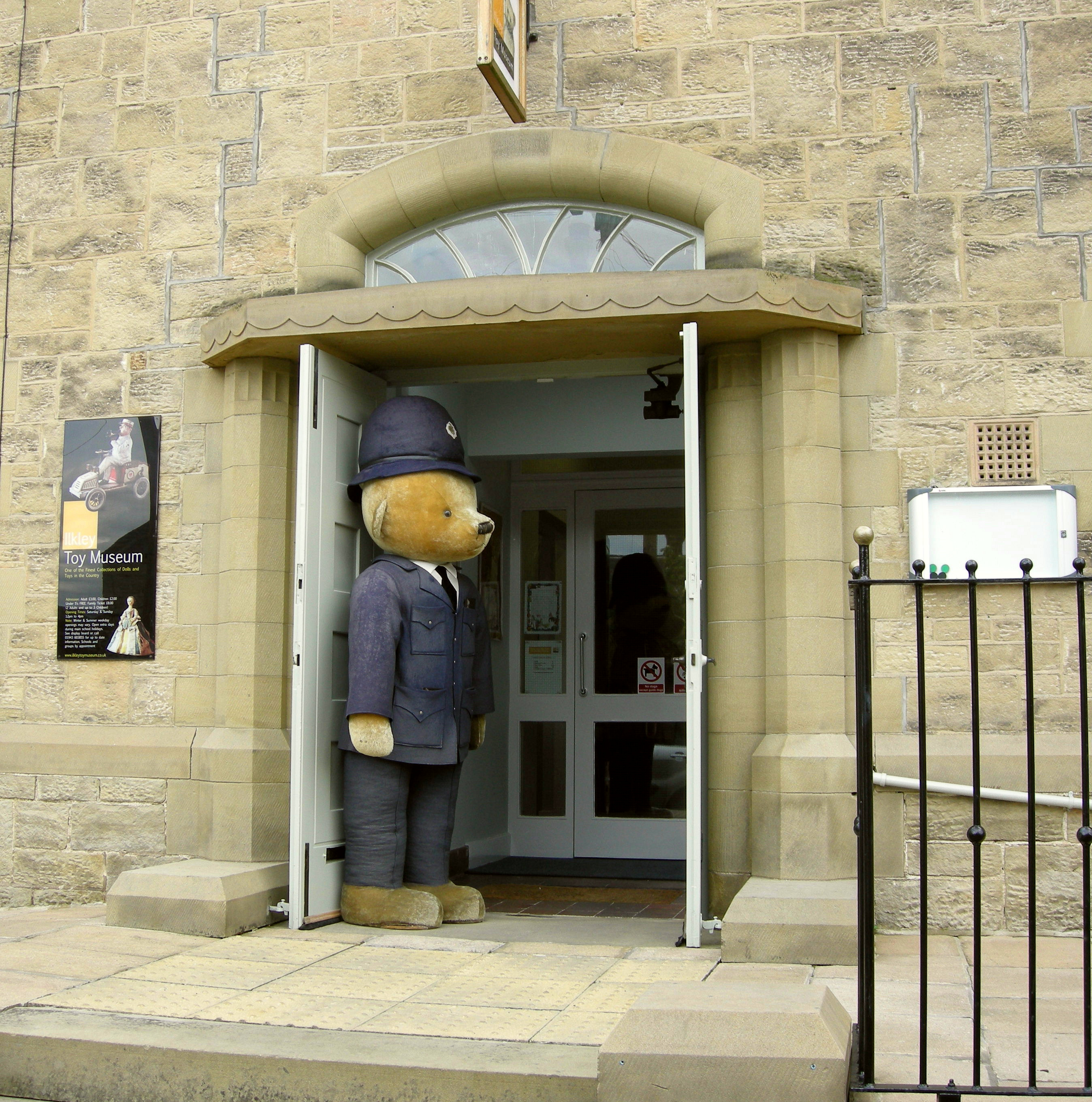
- Teddy bear standing outside Ilkley Toy Museum
- Established: 2002
- Location: Whitton Croft Road, Ilkley, West Yorkshire, England LS29 9HR
- Type: Toy museum
- Public transit access: Ilkley railway station, Ben Rhydding railway station
- Website: www.ilkleytoymuseum.co.uk

Ilkley Toy Museum in Ilkley, West Yorkshire, houses a private collection of toys dating from 350 BC to modern times, and is open to the public, schools, and groups.

== Galleries ==
=== Ground floor dolls' houses gallery ===
At the back is a 1940s English working model fairground automaton, which goes into action when one purchases a token and puts it in the slot placed under the window. There is also a Hornby clockwork train lift.

In this gallery is a large display of furnished dolls' houses, mainly Victorian, and mainly from Germany and England. They include Stafford House (1830), possibly named after Lancaster House, which was then a topical subject, being still in the process of building. There is an unusual dolls' house of Georgian appearance, with great, twisted pillars at the front, and Georgian furnishings and figures. The display also includes Sindy's House, manufactured around 1985.

Some of these dolls' houses are miniature shop displays, with minuscule and delicate objects on counters and shelves. There is thin glassware; there are miniature dolls; there is a tiny shopkeeper with little steel needles, holding real knitting. Tiny modern pieces of delicate crochet or tatting hang in some of these little shops as cloths and bags. The display includes a pet shop.

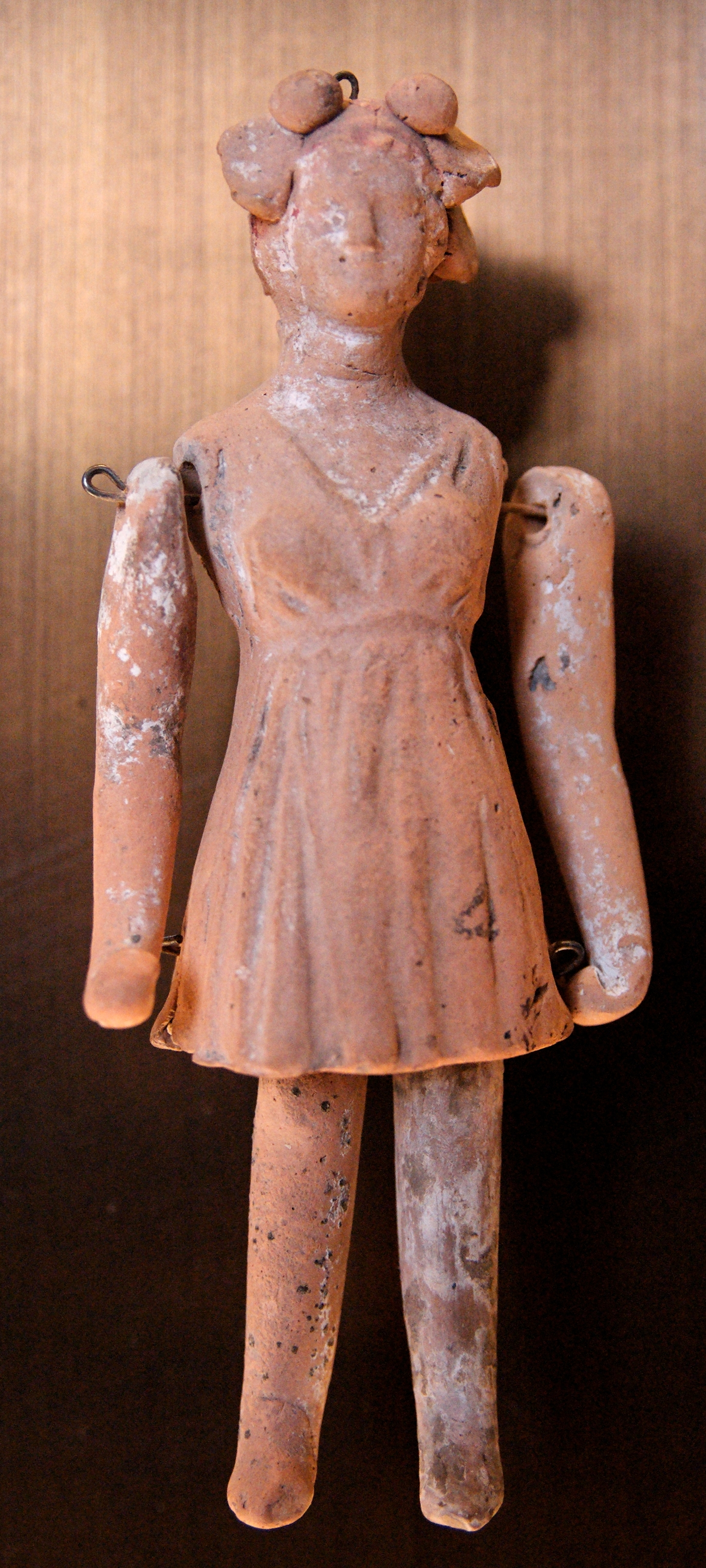
Terracotta Etruscan doll, 3rd century BCE, in the Louvre. The Ilkley Toy Museum doll is 4th century BCE

=== First floor toys gallery ===
Here are tin plate toys including the Märklin stove, and lead figures; games; wooden and paper toys in drawers. Some are Victorian, and some date from the 1950s. There are boys' dolls made to look like Bond villains, toy soldiers and 1960s toy cars including Corgi Silverstone.

In a central glass case is an Elastolin Wild West display. Among other items against the window wall is the flat-metal flotilla of Victorian or earlier warships and boats, set at adult eye-level on a glass shelf. There is an early 20th-century cardboard toy theatre in the gallery, by Benjamin Pollock.

=== First floor dolls gallery ===
The oldest exhibit is the 350 BCE articulated Etruscan ceramic doll. There is a display of early English wooden dolls, including Miss Barwick, dated c. 1750–1760. She was owned by the Barwick family of West Yeadon, and has a sedan chair with brocade furnishings embossed with a "B". Her face is sculpted with gesso on wood, her eyes are enamelled and her wig is made of real hair. There is also the Lady Potter Palmer doll, a Tudor stump baby. and Tete Jumeau bisque dolls once owned by a Russian family.

There is Blanche, the Steiff 1910 teddy bear, with her wartime history. She featured in the TV series Trainer, and appears in The Century of the Teddy Bear by Constance King. There is also a Farnell teddy bear of 1920 - a type perhaps more common in England before World War II. The Farnell bears had a hump at the back of the neck, and a lead-weighted tilt growler sewn into the back of the body. As you tipped your bear forward, it emitted a deep growling sound. The gallery also has Thomas the sad bear, and Eddie's Teddy.
