= Ilkley =

Town and civil parish in West Yorkshire, England

Coordinates: 53.925°N 1.822°W

- Town
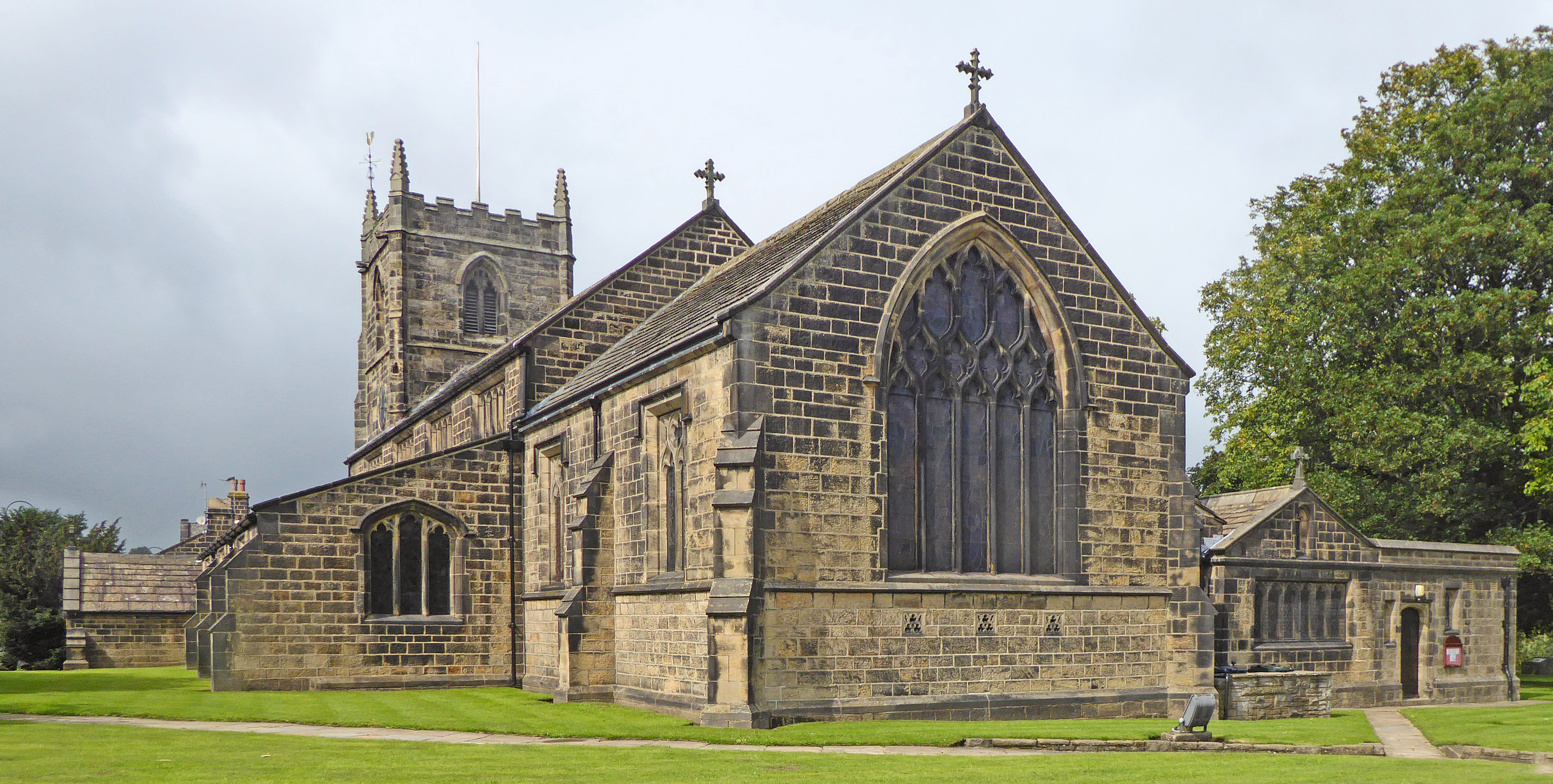
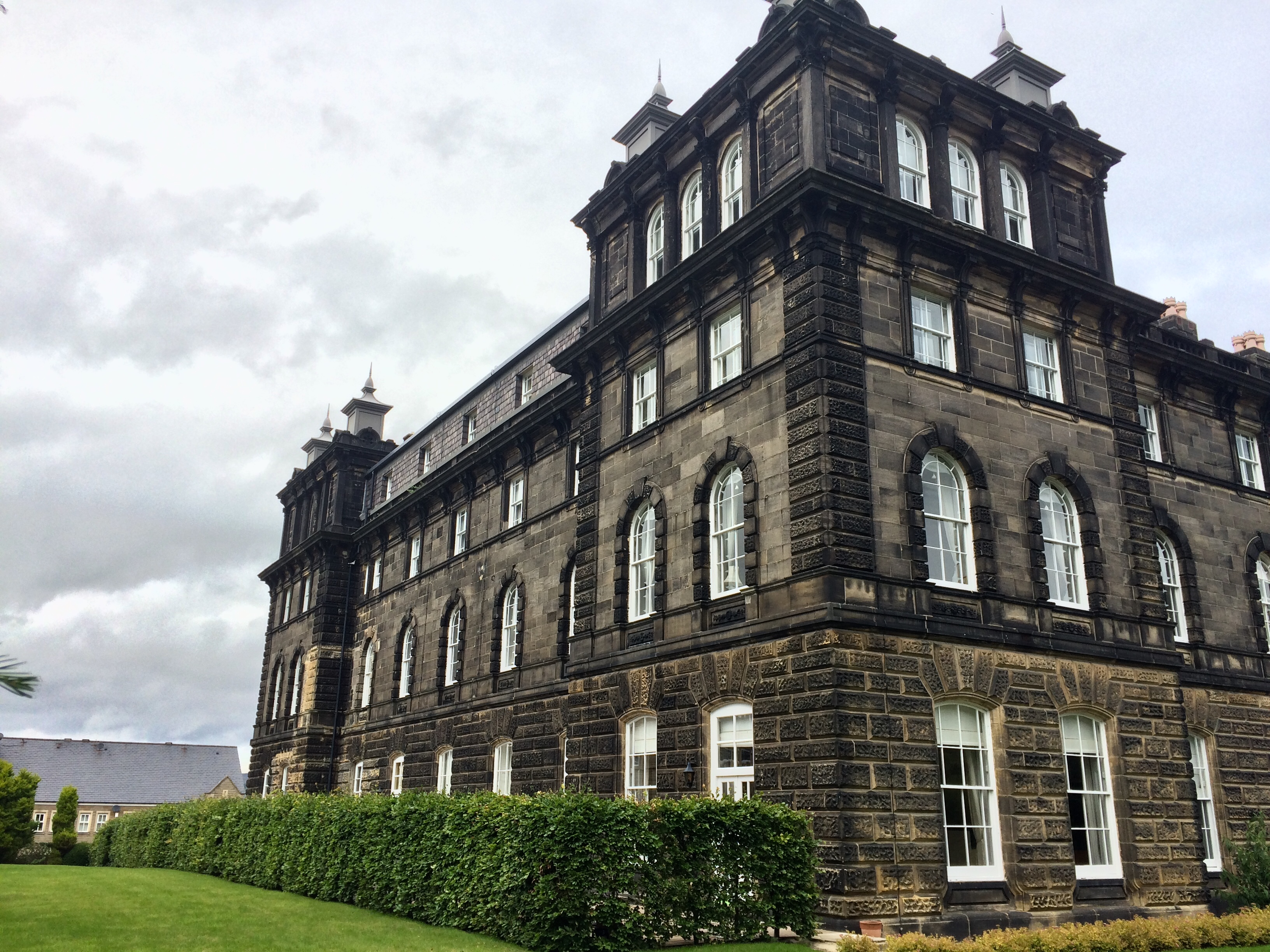
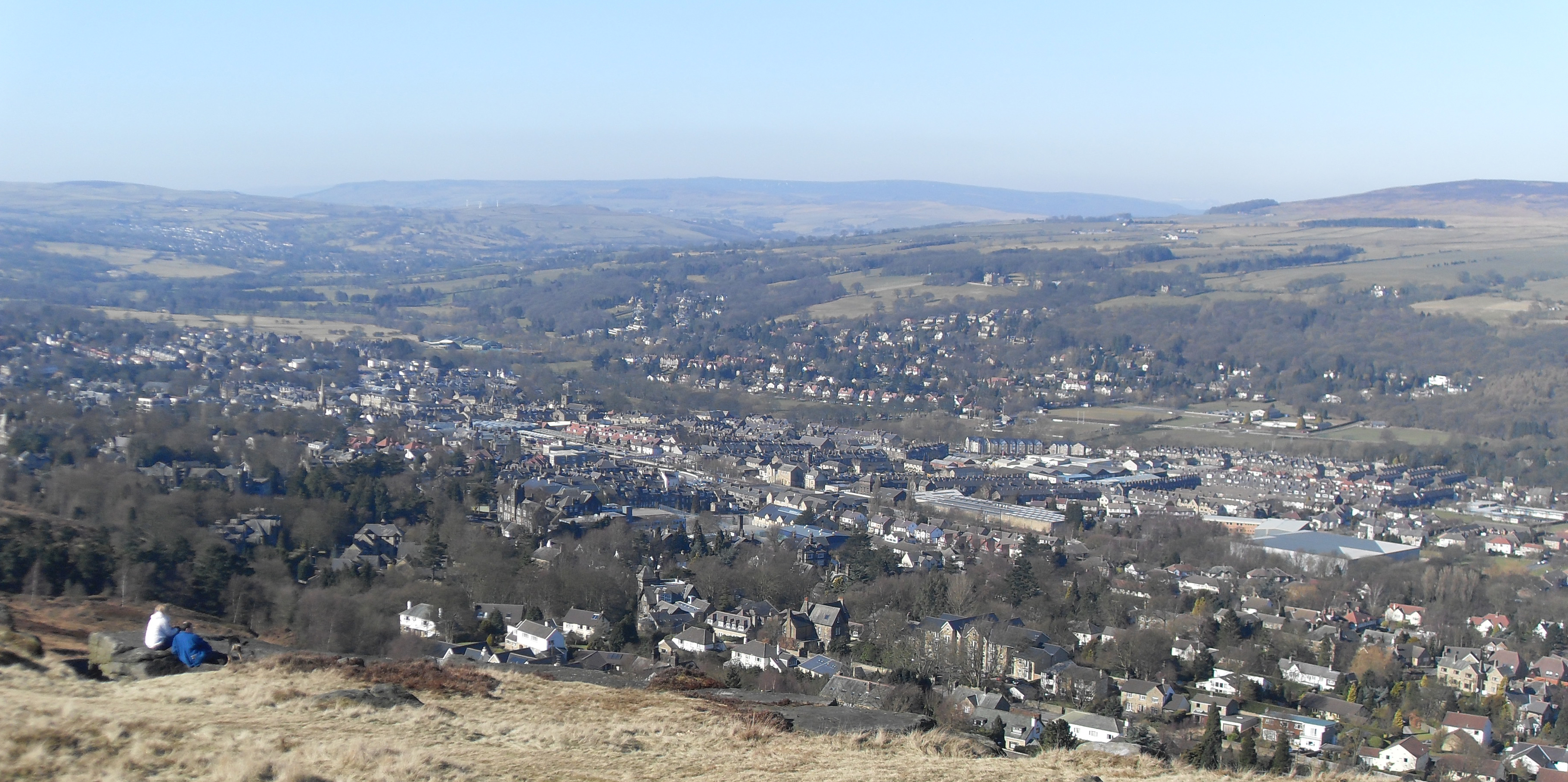
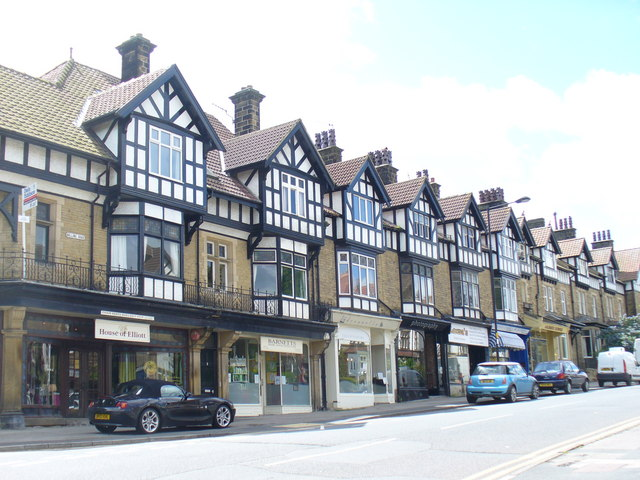
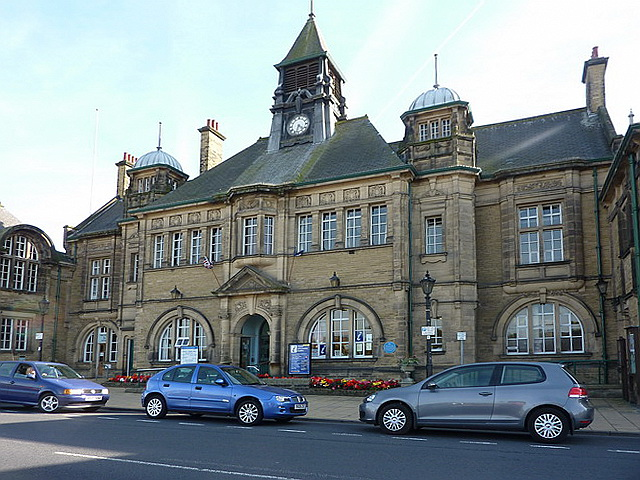
- All Saints’ Church Wells House View of Ilkley from Ilkley Moor Ben Rhydding Ilkley Town Hall

- Location within West Yorkshire
- Population: 14,809 (2011 census)
- OS grid reference: SE116477
- Civil parish: Ilkley
- Metropolitan borough: City of Bradford
- Metropolitan county: West Yorkshire
- Region: Yorkshire and the Humber
- Country: England
- Sovereign state: United Kingdom
- Post town: ILKLEY
- Postcode district: LS29
- Dialling code: 01943
- Police: West Yorkshire
- Fire: West Yorkshire
- Ambulance: Yorkshire
- UK Parliament: Keighley and Ilkley
- Councillors: Andrew Loy (Conservative); Richard Downey (Conservative); Jane Sellers (Conservative)
- Website: ilkley.org

Ilkley is a spa town and civil parish in the City of Bradford in West Yorkshire, in Northern England. Historically part of the West Riding of Yorkshire, Ilkley civil parish includes the adjacent village of Ben Rhydding and is part of the Ilkley and Addingham ward within the City of Bradford. Approximately 12 miles (19 km) north of Bradford and 17 miles (27 km) north-west of Leeds, the town lies mainly on the south bank of the River Wharfe in Wharfedale, one of the Yorkshire Dales.

Ilkley's spa town heritage and surrounding countryside make tourism an important local industry. The town centre is characterised by Victorian architecture, wide streets and floral displays. Ilkley Moor, to the south of the town, is the subject of a folk song, often described as the unofficial anthem of Yorkshire, "On Ilkla Moor Baht 'at". The song's words are written in Yorkshire dialect: its title translated is "On Ilkley Moor without a hat".

== History ==
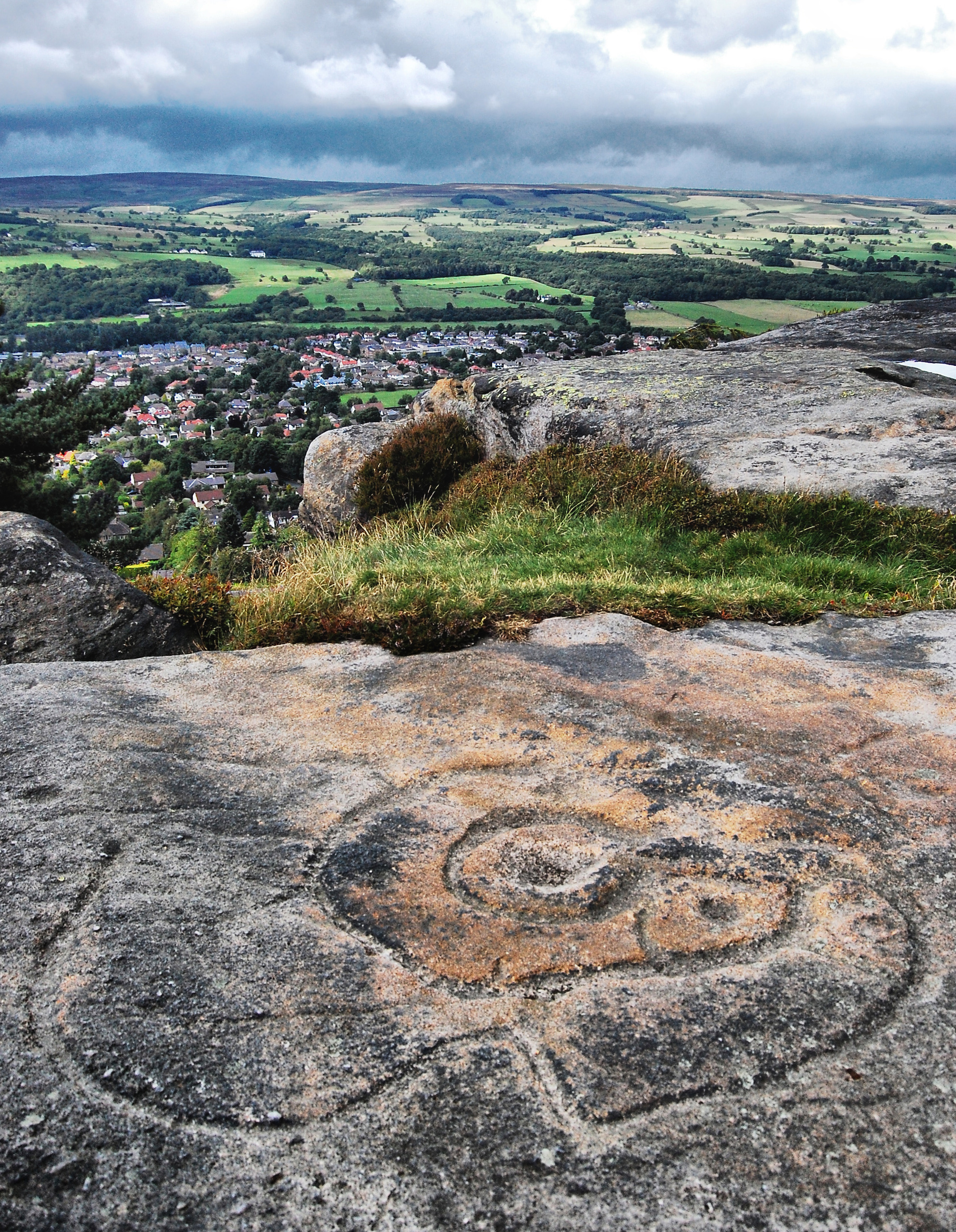
Bronze Age markings at Hangingstone Quarry, above Ilkley

The earliest evidence of habitation in the Ilkley area is from flint arrowheads or microliths, dating to the Mesolithic period, from about 11,000 BC onwards. The area around Ilkley has been continuously settled since at least the Neolithic, around 3000 BC; more than 250 cup and ring marks, and a curved swastika carving possibly dating to the period have been found on rock outcrops, and archaeological remains of dwellings are found on Ilkley Moor. A small stone circle (possibly a burial monument), known as the ‘Twelve Apostles’, was constructed 4,500 years ago, during the Early Bronze Age. Serious interest in the rock art of Ilkley began after the publication of the "Prehistoric Rock Sculptures of Ilkley" in 1879 by Romilly Allen in the Journal of the British Archaeological Association.

The remains of a Roman fort occupy a site near the town centre. Some authorities believe it is Olicana, dating to 79 AD, but the identification is not settled. A number of Roman altars have been discovered from the reigns of Antoninus Pius (138 to 161), and Septimius Severus and his son Caracalla (211 to 217). Ilkley Manor House stands on part of the site in Castle Yard and is home to various Roman artefacts, including an original altar dedicated to Verbeia, the goddess of the River Wharfe.

The name Ilkley derives from the Old English yllicalēah or illicalēah meaning 'Yllica's' or 'Illica's wood or clearing'.

Three Anglo-Saxon crosses from the 8th century that stood in the churchyard of All Saints' Church have been moved inside to prevent erosion. The church site, as a centre for Christian worship, extends to 627 AD, and the present mainly Victorian-era church incorporates medieval elements.

The Domesday Book of 1086 records Ilkley (Ilecliue/Illecliue/Illiclei/Illicleia) as being in the possession of William de Percy 1st Baron Percy. The land was acquired by the Middelton family of Myddelton Lodge, from about a century after the time of William the Conqueror. The family lost possession through a series of land sales and mortgage repossessions over a period of about a hundred years from the early 19th century. The agents of William Middelton (1815–1885) were responsible for the design of the new town of Ilkley to replace the village which had stood there before.

In the 17th and 18th centuries the town gained a reputation for the efficacy of its water. In the 19th century it became established as a fashionable spa town, with the construction of Ben Rhydding Hydro, a hydropathic establishment at Wheatley, a mile to the east, between 1843 and 1844. Charles Darwin underwent hydropathic treatment at Wells House when his book On the Origin of Species was published on 24 November 1859, whilst staying with his family at North View House (now Hillside Court). Tourists flocked to 'take the waters' and bathe in the cold-water spring. Wheatley was renamed Ben Rhydding after the Hydro, which has been demolished.

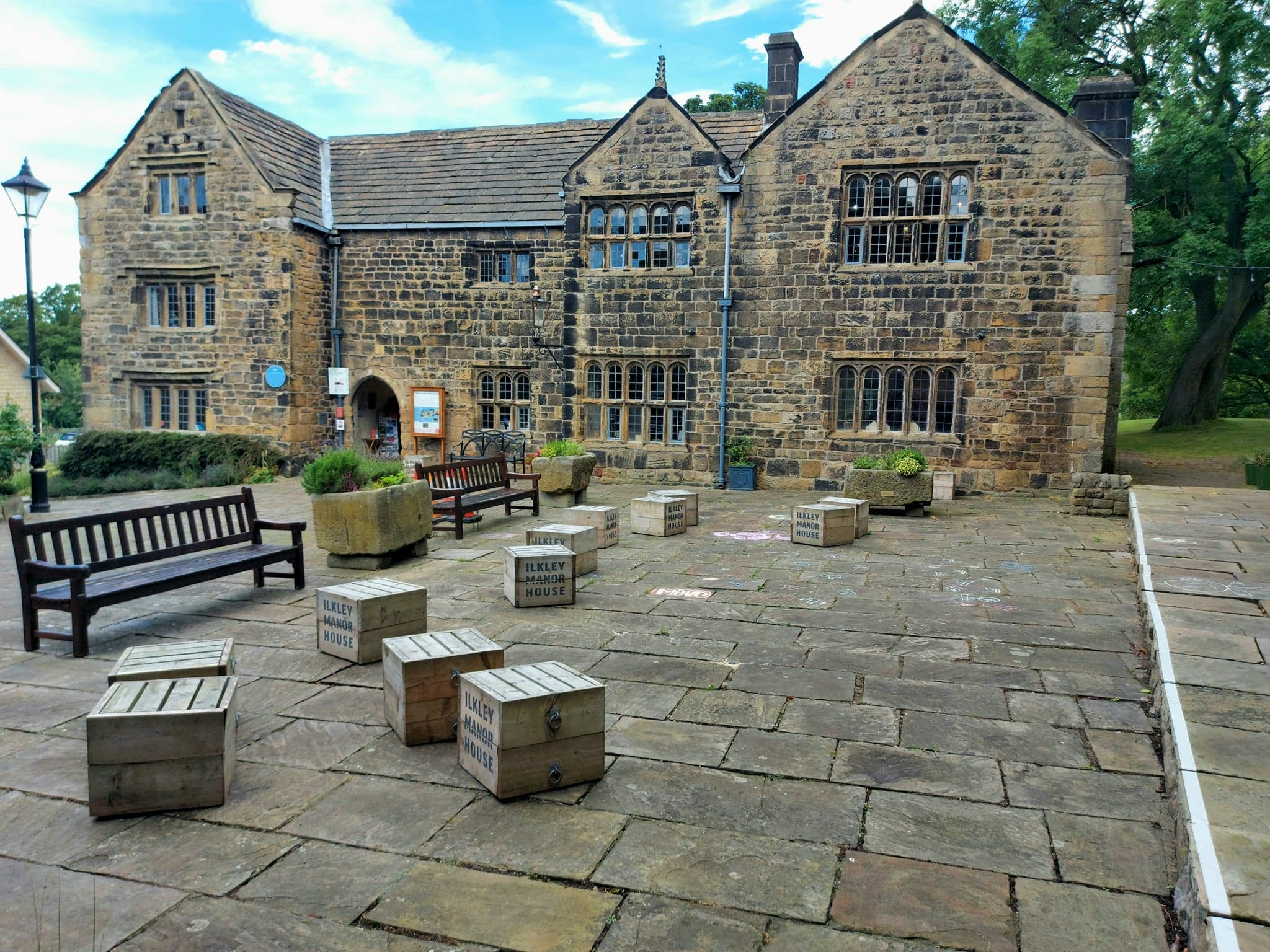
Ilkley Manor House, Castle Yard

Development based on the Hydro movement, and on the establishment of convalescent homes and hospitals, was accelerated in August 1865 by the construction of the Otley and Ilkley Joint Railway, which linked to the Leeds and Bradford Railway and the North Eastern Railway. The Midland Railway built a connection to Skipton via Bolton Abbey in May 1888.

Other Victorian visitors to the town included Madame Tussaud. The only remaining hydro building is the white cottage known as White Wells House. The cottage can be seen and visited on the edge of the moor overlooking the town.

== Governance ==
Ilkley Town Council

In May 2018, the parish council became a town council, with Cllr Stephen Butler serving as the first Town Mayor. The town consists of four wards and elects 14 councillors: Ilkley North (3 councillors), Ilkley South (3), Ilkley West (4) and Ben Rhydding (4). It meets in the 1908 Ilkley Town Hall on Station Road. The council precept is collected with the annual Council Tax to fund its running and to aid the development of local projects.

UK Parliament constituency

Ilkley is in the Keighley and Ilkley UK Parliament constituency, held since 2019 by Robbie Moore, the Conservative MP. He defeated John Grogan, who had himself defeated the previous Conservative MP, Kris Hopkins, in 2017. Hopkins was first elected in 2010, replacing Ann Cryer. Cryer held the seat between 1997 and 2010, and her late husband Bob held the seat between 1974 and 1983.

Previous governance

Before 1974 Ilkley was an urban district, a type of local government district. Ilkley Urban District Council shared local government responsibilities with the West Riding County Council. The Local Government Act 1972 dissolved urban districts and in 1974 Ilkley adopted its current status as a ward of the metropolitan borough of the City of Bradford. Services provided by the urban district council are now run centrally by the City of Bradford Metropolitan District Council.

Until 2006 Ilkley civil parish consisted of Ilkley ward, which includes Ben Rhydding, and the north half of Rombalds ward. The latter ward housed the villages of Burley-in-Wharfedale and Menston. The population of the parish in 2001 was therefore considerably higher than it is today, consisting of 24,954 residents. In 2006, Burley-in-Wharfedale and Menston established their own parishes and today Ilkley consists only of Ilkley ward (13,828 residents).

Local Councillors for the City of Bradford Metropolitan District Council

Following boundary changes in 2026, the town is part of the Ilkley and Addingham ward in the metropolitan borough of the City of Bradford and is represented by three Conservative councillors, Andrew Loy, Richard Downey and Jane Sellers.

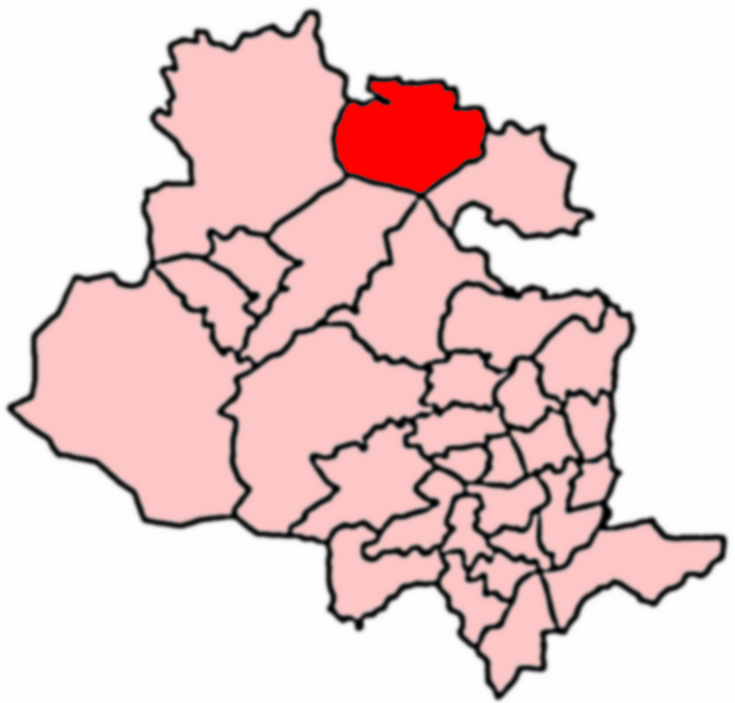
2004 Boundaries of Ilkley Ward.

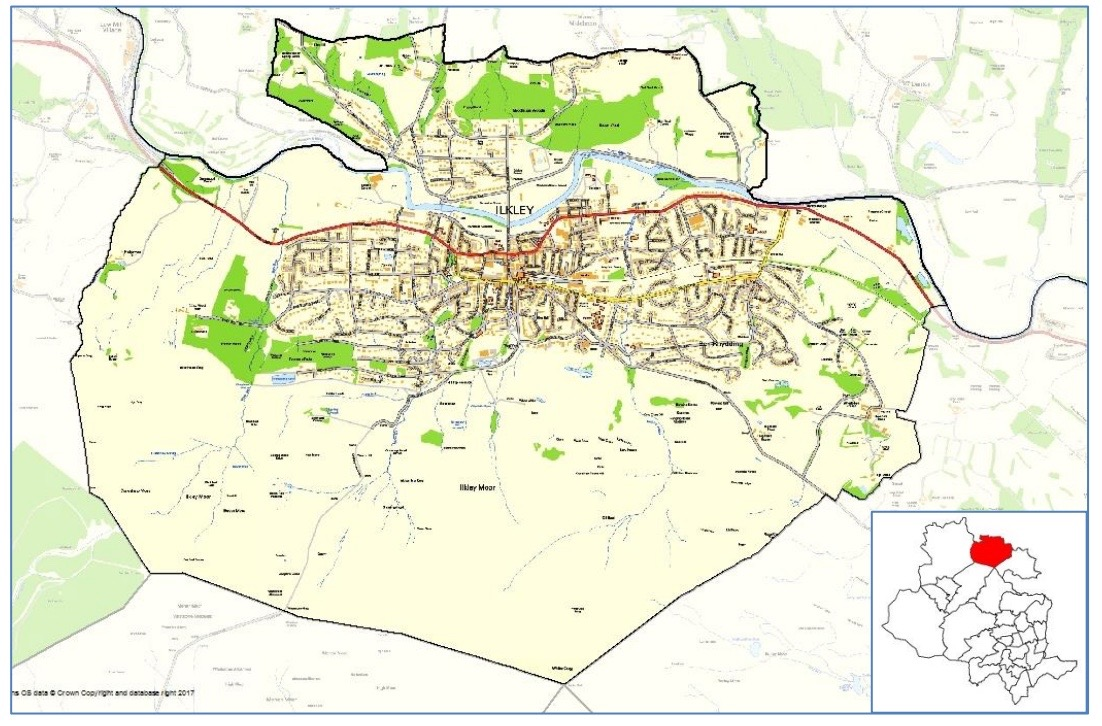
Ilkley Ward 2019 from CBMDC Ilkley Ward profile

| Election | Councillor | Councillor | Councillor |
|---|---|---|---|
| 2004 | Colin George Powell (Con) | Brian Martin Smith (Con) | Anne Gillian Hawkesworth (Con) |
| 2006 | Colin Powell (Con) | Martin Smith (Con) | Anne Hawkesworth (Con) |
| 2007 | Colin Powell (Con) | Martin Smith (Con) | Anne Hawkesworth (Con) |
| 2008 | Colin Powell (Con) | Martin Smith (Con) | Anne Hawkesworth (Con) |
| 2010 | Michael Peter Gibbons (Con) | Martin Smith (Con) | Anne Hawkesworth (Con) |
| 2011 | Mike Gibbons (Con) | Martin Smith (Con) | Anne Hawkesworth (Con) |
| 2012 | Mike Gibbons (Con) | Martin Smith (Con) | Anne Hawkesworth (Con) |
| January 2013 | Mike Gibbons (Con) | Martin Smith (Con) | Anne Hawkesworth (The Independents) |
| 2014 | Mike Gibbons (Con) | Martin Smith (Con) | Anne Hawkesworth (The Independents) |
| 2015 | Mike Gibbons (Con) | Martin Smith (Con) | Anne Hawkesworth (The Independents) |
| 2016 | Mike Gibbons (Con) | Martin Smith (Con) | Anne Hawkesworth (The Independents) |
| 2018 | Mike Gibbons (Con) | Martin Smith (Con) | Anne Hawkesworth (The Independents) |
| 2019 | Mike Gibbons (Con) | Kyle Jameson Green (Con) | Anne Hawkesworth (The Independents) |
| 2021 | Mike Gibbons (Con) | Kyle Green (Con) | Anne Hawkesworth (The Independents) |
| April 2022 | Mike Gibbons (Independent) | Kyle Green (Con) | Anne Hawkesworth (The Independents) |
| 2022 | Andrew John Patrick Loy (Con) | Kyle Green (Con) | Anne Hawkesworth (The Independents) |
| 2023 | Andrew Loy (Con) | David Nunns (Con) | Anne Hawkesworth (The Independents) |
| 2024 | Andrew Loy (Con) | David Nunns (Con) | Ros Brown (Green) |
| 2026 | Andrew Loy (Con) | Richard Downey (Con) | Jane Sellers (Con) |

indicates seat up for re-election. indicates councillor defection.

== Geography ==
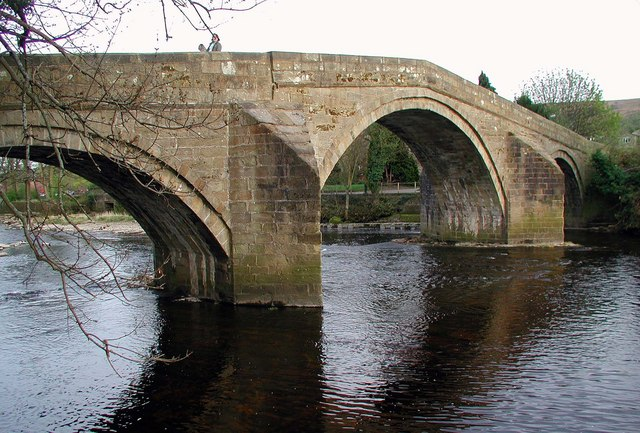
The Old Bridge, Ilkley

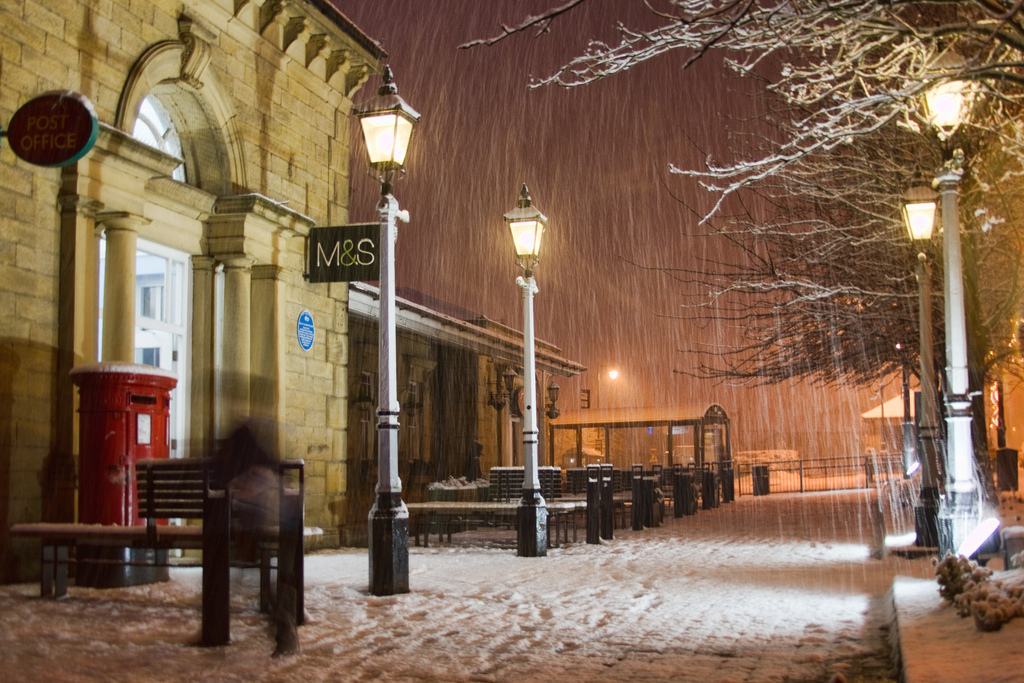
Early winter snowfall on Station Road in the town centre

Nearby are the hamlets of Middleton (1 mile (1.6 km)), Denton (2.7 miles (4.3 km)) and Bolton Abbey (6 miles (9.7 km)); the villages of Addingham (3.1 miles (5.0 km)), Burley-in-Wharfedale (3.8 miles (6.1 km)) and Menston (5.4 miles (8.7 km)); and the towns of Guiseley (7.6 miles (12.2 km)) and Skipton (8 miles (13 km)).

The town is within the travel-to-work radius of Leeds and Bradford. Leeds is 18 miles (29 km) away and Bradford 15.6 miles (25.1 km) by road, with a railway connection offering about 35 trains to each destination per day from Ilkley railway station. The railway, before the Beeching axe, also connected to Addingham, Bolton Abbey and Skipton to the west, and to Otley, Pool-in-Wharfedale, meeting the main Leeds to Harrogate line at Arthington.

The town partially straddles the River Wharfe in a valley, rising from the river at 230 feet (70 m) to 650 feet (200 m) above sea level, up Ilkley Moor (a bracken and heather covered moorland, with rocky outcrops, to the south) and to 540 feet (160 m) across Middleton Woods in the north. The river runs through the northern extent of the town from west to east, and is crossed by four bridges, in order: a 16th century three-arched stone bridge, now closed to road traffic; a 19th century single-span wrought-iron bridge; a suspension bridge for foot traffic only (a set of concrete stepping stones) and a prefabricated steel arched box-girder bridge. The river is prone to flooding the sports fields (and a few houses) that occupy the watermeadows. Below the historic Ilkley golf club house, in Middleton, the access to Nesfield is regularly restricted due to the river closing the road.

=== Demography ===
A person from Ilkley is called an Olicanian which is derived from Olicana, thought to be the name of the Roman fort Ilkley is built upon. The ethnic make-up of Ilkley's population is 98.02% White, 0.74% mixed, 0.72% Asian, 0.37% Chinese or other ethnic group and 0.14% Black. The largest age group is 45- to 59-year-olds (20.73%).

== Economy ==
Ilkley compared
| 2001 UK Census | Ilkley | Bradford (borough) | England |
| Population of working age | 9,224 | 326,778 | 35,532,091 |
| Full-time employment | 37.4% | 37.7% | 40.8% |
| Part-time employment | 12.6% | 11.9% | 11.8% |
| Self-employed | 11.9% | 6.8% | 8.3% |
| Unemployed | 1.8% | 4.4% | 3.3% |
| Retired | 20.0% | 12.8% | 13.5% |

The town is a tourist destination and is used as a base from which to explore the famous moor and the countryside beyond. Ilkley is a shopping town that sells everything from game, fine wine, expensive fashions and fine art. The Victorian parades of the Grove and Brook Street have a selection of speciality shops. The town's original Victorian arcade has been restored as an indoor shopping walkway complete with a fountain and hanging baskets. Bettys, the Yorkshire tea room, has a shop in the town. Ilkley has little by way of industry or commerce but employers include the Woolmark Company, Spooner Industries and NG Bailey. The town is also home to three breweries, Ilkley Brewery situated on the outskirts, Wharfedale Brewery which is housed within the grounds of a former 18th century farmhouse in the town centre and Bini Brew Co a modern craft brewery near the town centre.

According to the 2001 UK census, the industry of employment of residents aged 16–74 was 18.8% property and business services, 14.8% retail and wholesale, 13.4% education, 13.1% health and social work, 9.6% manufacturing, 5.7% finance, 4.8% construction, 4.8% public administration, 4.4% hotels and restaurants, 4.2% transport and communications, 0.6% energy and water supply, 0.5% agriculture, 0.1% mining, and 5.2% other. Compared with national figures, Ilkley town had a relatively high percentage of residents working in education and health and social work. The town had a relatively low percentage working in transport and communication and manufacturing. The census recorded the economic activity of residents aged 16–74, 2.2% students were with jobs, 3.7% students without jobs, 5.8% looking after home or family, 2.7% permanently sick or disabled, and 1.8% economically inactive for other reasons. Ilkley's 1.8% unemployment rate was low compared with the national rate of 3.3%. The City of Bradford has a relatively low proportion of people who were self-employed compared to the whole of England, but Ilkley's rate of 11.9% was well above both the district and national figures.

== Transport ==
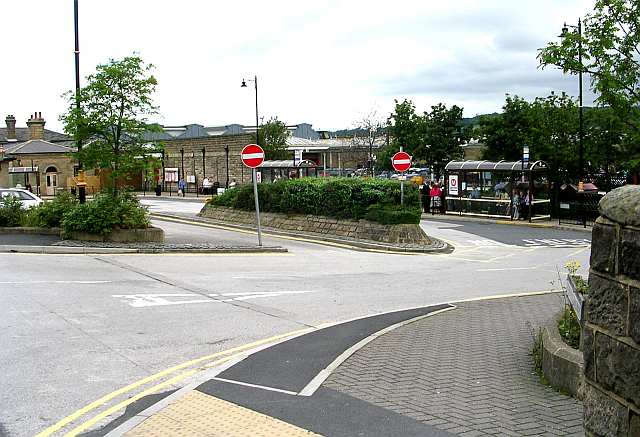
Ilkley bus station

Ilkley bus station, adjacent to the railway station on Station Road, is the focal point for services to Keighley, Leeds, Skipton, Grassington, Malham and Otley. The main operators are First West Yorkshire, Keighley Bus Company and North Yorkshire Council.

Ilkley lies on the A65 road, which runs between Leeds and Kendal. The nearest substantial motorways are the M62 at Bradford, the M1 at Leeds and the A1(M) at Wetherby.

The civil parish is served by two railway stations: Ilkley and Ben Rhydding. These are linked by the Wharfedale Line, along which Northern Trains operates services between Ilkley, Bradford Forster Square and Leeds stations.

Leeds Bradford Airport is located close to Ilkley.

== Sport ==
There is a wide variety of sports clubs and facilities in and around Ilkley. Notable clubs include the Ilkley Lawn Tennis and Squash Club, founded in 1880 (member of the Lawn Tennis Association), which hosts an Ilkley Squash Open that has attracted world-class players such as Peter Barker; there is also the gym and Ilkley Trophy, a distinguished tennis tournament for men (an ATP event) as well as women (an ITF W100 event). Furthermore, there are also the Ilkley Golf Club, Yorkshire's third oldest golf club founded in 1890, and where Colin Montgomerie for some years practised the game; Ilkley Rugby Club; and Ilkley Harriers Athletics Club. There are a number of football, rugby and hockey teams. Ilkley Cricket Club play in the Aire-Wharfe League. The nearby Ben Rhydding Sports Club in Ben Rhydding is the home of Ben Rhydding Hockey Club, founded in 1901, and Ben Rhydding Cricket Club. An Ilkley Karate Club is run by former UK champion Mark Outterside.

Public facilities include indoor and outdoor swimming pools, and outdoor tennis courts at Ilkley's Lido. Constructed in 1935, it is one of only four public open-air swimming pools in Yorkshire and is a tourist attraction during the summer holiday season.

Ilkley Town A.F.C. are a Charter Standard Community Football Club that provides football opportunities to over 650 members (male & female) from under 5's to SuperVets (over 45's). In 2021, the Ilkley Town AFC was admitted into the North West Counties League Division One North.

=== Cycling races ===
The town has seen a number of high-profile international cycle races pass through. The steep climb up to the Cow and Calf rocks at the edge of Ilkley Moor is normally the reason for the races to visit as it presents a short but challenging climb. For three consecutive years between 1994 and 1996, the climb was used as part of the Leeds Classic, which was part of the World Cup series of events. In both 2005 and 2007, the town hosted stages of the Tour of Britain race, with Ilkley Moor being a categorised climb on each occasion.

In 2014, the town had its biggest cycling moment to date when the Tour de France passed through. The route approached the town on the A65 from Otley and passed through the town centre along the A65. As a direct consequence of the success of the Tour de France its organisers, ASO, established the Tour de Yorkshire. Ilkley features in Stage 3 of the inaugural Tour, with the race set to enter from the west along the A65, before turning to climb up past the Cow and Calf.

The annual Tour de Yorkshire which is a spin-off from the 2014 Tour de France includes Ilkley as part of the route. In 2018 the stage 2 finish line was at the Cow and Calf rocks, its first ever summit finish.

== Culture and attractions ==
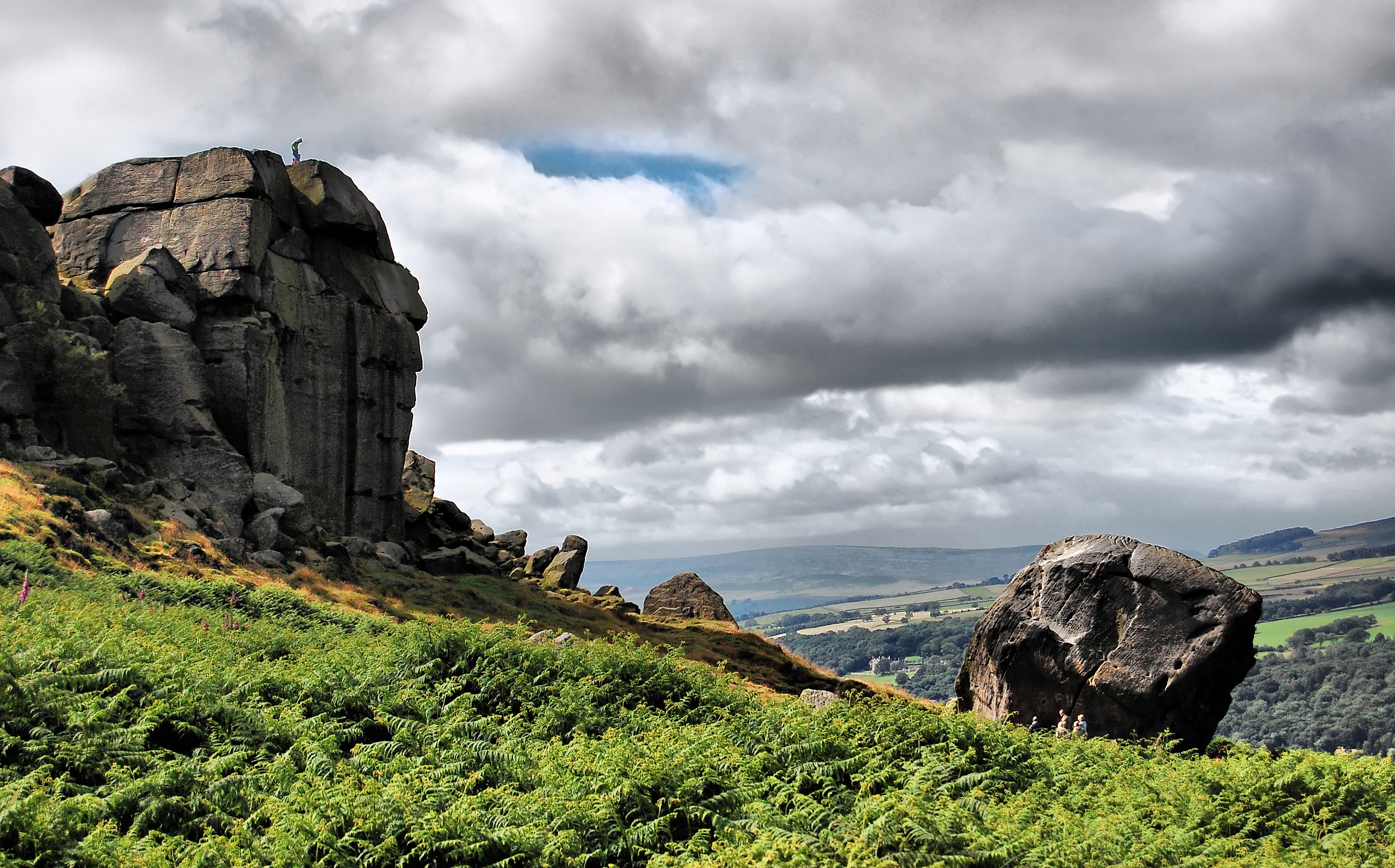
Cow and Calf rocks

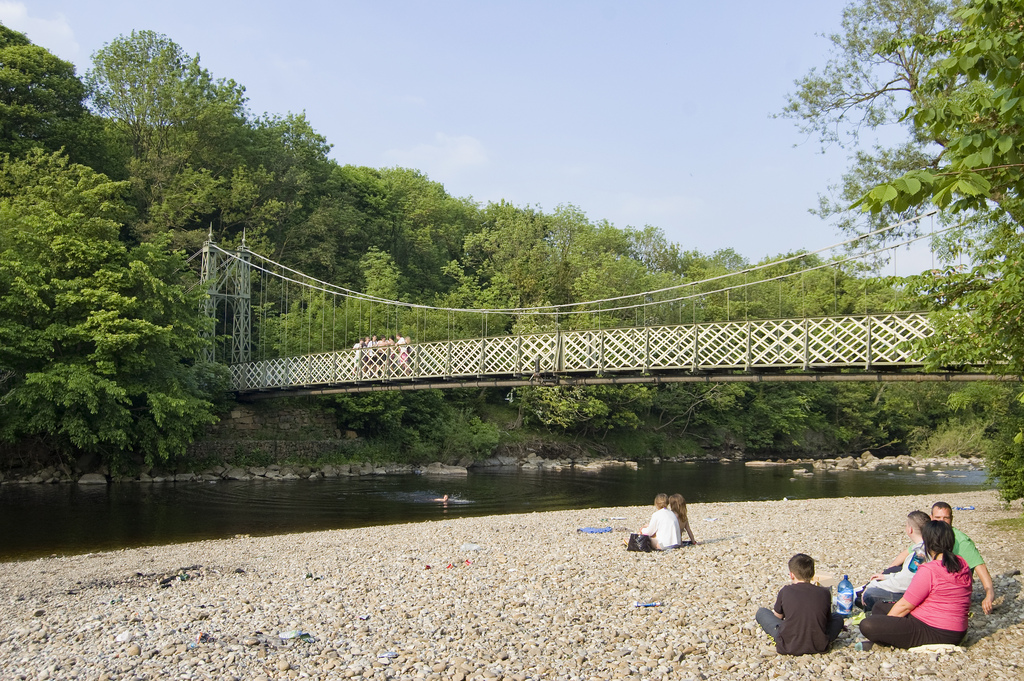
Old suspension bridge spanning the Wharfe in Ilkley.

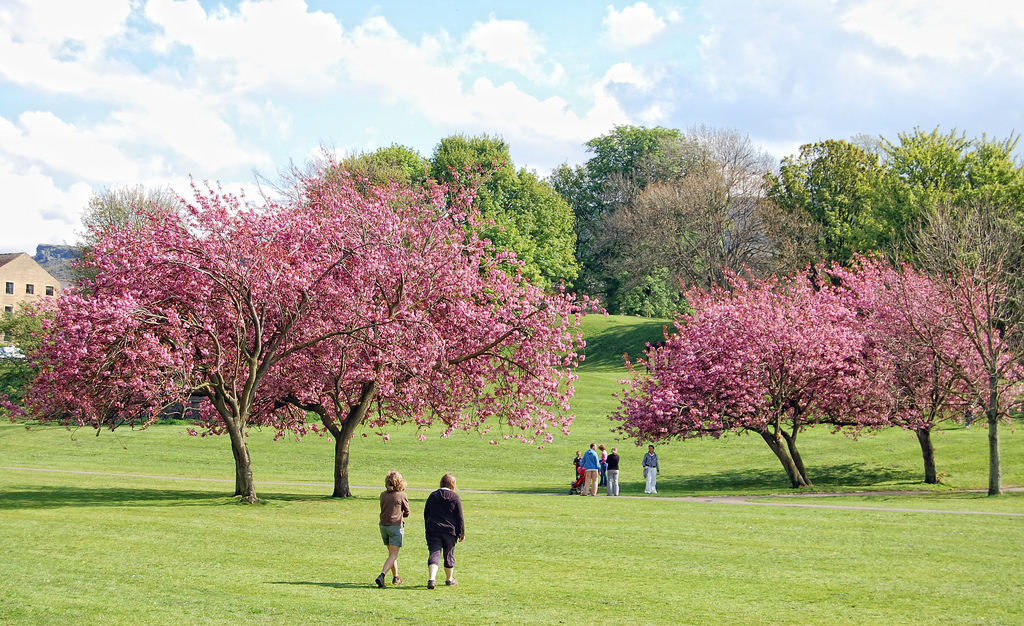
Vibrant cherry blossoms adorn the river bank close to the town centre.

Ilkley town centre is a tourist attraction with a high number of small independent shops. Of particular note is Lishman's of Ilkley, an award-winning butcher shop whose owner, David Lishman, became one of Rick Stein's superheroes in 2003. Ilkley is one of five towns to feature a Bettys tearoom and is home to the Michelin-starred Box Tree restaurant where Marco Pierre White trained. In 1991 Ilkley won the Entente Florale and in 1990 and 2004 the Britain in Bloom contest in the category of 'Town'. In 2006 Ilkley became a Fairtrade Town.

The Manor House, one of the town's oldest buildings, houses a museum and art gallery. The museum contains prehistoric artefacts and documents the Roman fort of Olicana – remains of which are exposed at the back of the building – as well as the rise of Ilkley as a Victorian spa town. Ilkley Toy Museum has a collection of toys dating from 350 BC and a collection of English wooden dolls.

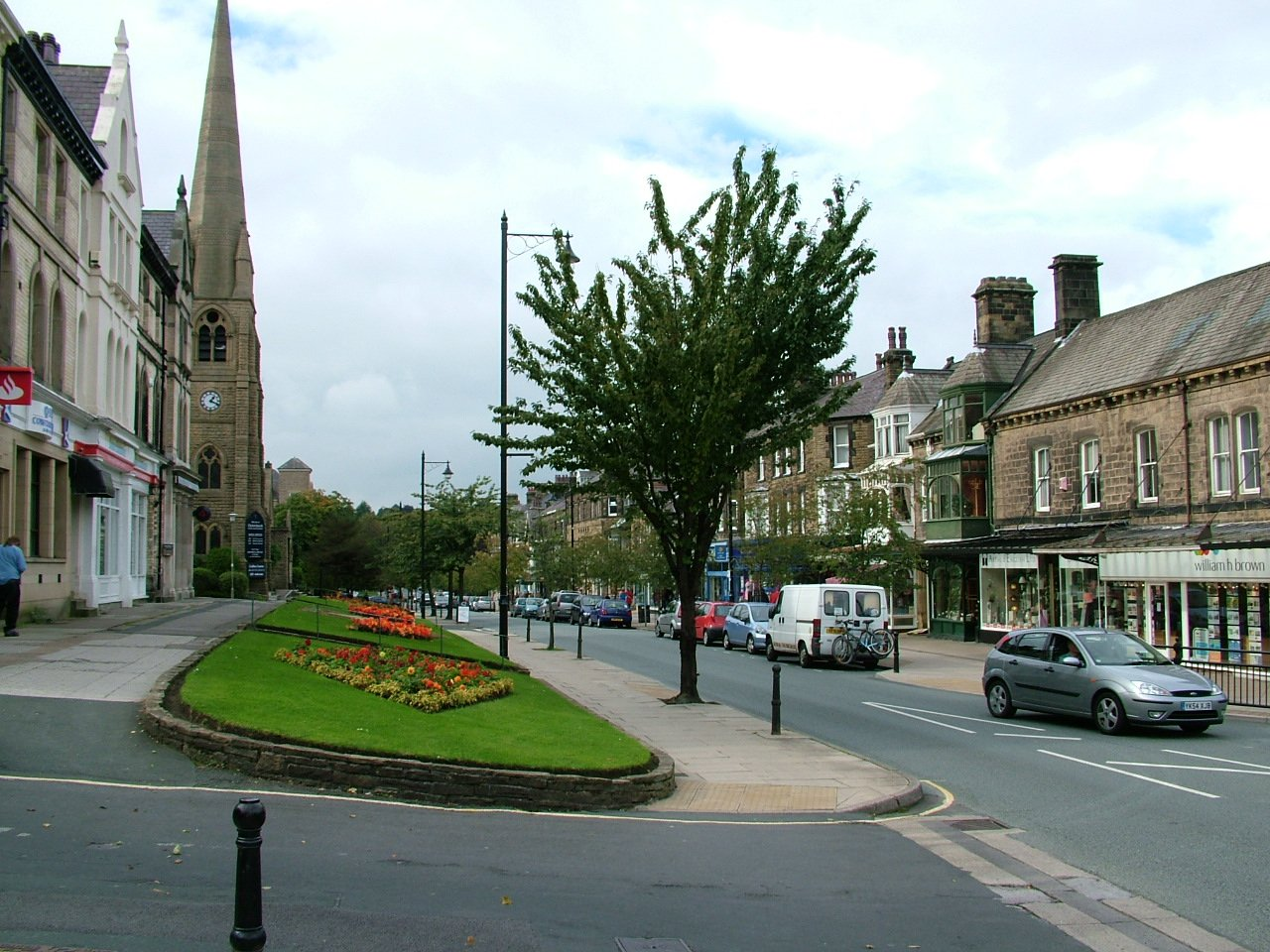
The Grove, Ilkley's principal shopping street, designed with wide pavements for promenading

The historic Ilkley Golf club house was built over a hundred years ago in Middleton, it overlooks the golf course which stretches on into North Yorkshire following along the side of the River Wharfe.

Ilkley's rural surroundings attract walkers and cyclists to the area. The landmark Cow and Calf rocks, which overlook the town on Ilkley Moor, consist of a large outcrop, which allegedly imitates a cow, and a boulder, which imitates a calf. The site is also visited for its rock climbing routes. The Old Bridge just outside the town centre is the official start to the Dales Way, an 84-mile (135 km) walk through the dales to Bowness-on-Windermere in the Lake District.

Ilkley Memorial Gardens commemorate men of the town killed in both the First and Second World Wars. Designed by John James Joass and laid out in 1922, the gardens are listed at Grade II on the Register of Historic Parks and Gardens of Special Historic Interest in England. Darwin Gardens, to the south of the town, is a Millennium Green which commemorates the town's links with English naturalist Charles Darwin. The Green features a maze, whose design was influenced by the Swastika Stone carving, and includes monuments with an evolutionary theme.

Ilkley is home to the largest and oldest literary festival in the North of England, the Ilkley Literature Festival. The 1984 British comedy film A Private Function, written by Alan Bennett, was filmed in Ilkley and Ben Rhydding. The town was also one of the locations used for the 2003 British comedy film Calendar Girls. The BBC programme Psychoville is set, in part, in Ilkley.

Ilkley Playhouse is a live community theatre located on Weston Road in the centre of Ilkley, hosting a wide range of plays, musical and other events.

A complementary medicine festival has been held in Ilkley since 1988 and is currently held twice a year, attracting 2,000 visitors.

Since 1969 Ilkley has been twinned with Coutances in France.

In December 2020 it was announced that a stretch of the River Wharfe at Ilkley would become the first river bathing place to be added to the list of designated bathing places in England under the Bathing Water Regulations 2013, which hitherto included coastal sites and lakes. This followed a campaign by the Ilkley Clean River Campaign.

== Local media ==
Local news and television programmes are provided by BBC Yorkshire and ITV Yorkshire. Television signals are received from one of the two local relay transmitters (Wharfedale and Addingham).

Local radio stations are BBC Radio Leeds on 95.3 FM, Greatest Hits Radio Harrogate & The Yorkshire Dales on 107.1 FM, Capital Yorkshire on 105.6 FM, Heart Yorkshire on 107.6 FM, Drystone Radio on 102 FM and My Ilkley Radio, a community based radio station that broadcasts online.

The IIkley Gazette is the town's local weekly newspaper.

== Education ==
=== Schools ===
A free school was first established in Ilkley by a Mr Marshall who in 1608 bequeathed £100 for its endowment. Current schools include four primary schools, All Saints' C of E Primary School, Ashlands Primary School, Ben Rhydding Primary School, Sacred Heart Catholic Primary School, Ben Rhydding; three preparatory schools, Moorfield School, Westville House School, Middleton, and Ghyll Royd School and Pre-School. Augustus Wooldridge Godby founded Ghyll Royd School in 1889. He was Headmaster until his death on 5 November 1922. Formerly an all boys School, Ghyll Royd has been a co-educational preparatory school since 1999, accepting children from two years old until they leave at eleven in Year 6. Ilkley also has one secondary school, Ilkley Grammar School.

=== Further education ===
In 1975, David Gayle founded the Yorkshire Ballet Seminars which brought distinguished names in dance, like Alicia Markova, to Ilkley College of Education. In 1978, Ilkley College of Education merged with Bingley College of Education to become Ilkley College. In 1982, Ilkley College merged with Bradford College to become Bradford and Ilkley Community College. In 1999, the Ilkley campus of Bradford and Ilkley Community College closed despite opposition. The campus had occupied a 15.64 acres (6.33 ha) site at Wells House, which was sold for housing after its closure.

== Religion ==
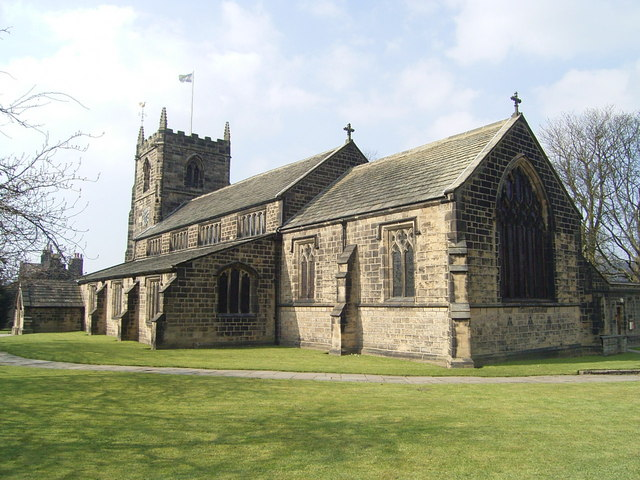
All Saints' Parish Church

According to Census 2001, 75.64% of Ilkley residents are Christian. The second largest group are people with no religion who account for 15.53% of residents. 7.48% did not state their religion and 1.34% fall into a variety of other religious groups.

=== Places of worship ===
Ilkley's medieval parish church All Saints', largely reconstructed in the Victorian era, houses artefacts of the site's ancient Christian heritage including three Saxon crosses and today operates within the Anglican Communion. An expanding congregation in the 19th century triggered plans in 1873 for a second church which became St Margaret's Church, designed by Richard Norman Shaw and completed in 1879. Worship at the church is conducted in the Anglo-Catholic tradition and in 2005 was led by David Hope, Baron Hope of Thornes. When the Archbishop of York resigned he became vicar at Ilkley until his retirement in 2006.

Other places of worship in Ilkley include Ben Rhydding Methodist Church (Methodist), Christchurch (Methodist/United Reformed), Ilkley Baptist Church (Baptist), Kingdom Hall, Ilkley (Jehovah's Witnesses), St John's Parish Church, St Margaret's Church, Ben Rhydding (Anglican), the Church of the Sacred Heart (Roman Catholic) and the Ilkley Society of Friends' (Quaker) Meeting House, which opened in 1869. Churches Together in Ilkley exists to encourage co-operation amongst member churches.

The former Wesleyan Chapel at the junction of Skipton Road and Bolton Bridge Road was built in 1834 but in 1892 it became Ilkley's first museum. In 1914 it became a commercial garage and is now a cycle store.

== Arms ==
Coat of arms of Ilkley
| Notes Originally granted 4 December 1956 to the Ilkley Urban District Council. Crest On a wreath Argent and Gules a mount of rocky Moorland Proper thereon issuant from a crown palisado Or a bull salient Gules the horns Gold. Escutcheon Gules a Stone Celtic Cross Proper between two fountains on a chief Argent a lion passant guardant Sable armed and langued of the first. Motto Per Salubritatum Opes (Through Health, Wealth) |

== See also ==
- Listed buildings in Ilkley
- List of people from Ilkley
