= White Wells =

Spa bathhouse in Ilkley, West Yorkshire, England

Coordinates: 53.91690°N 1.82177°W

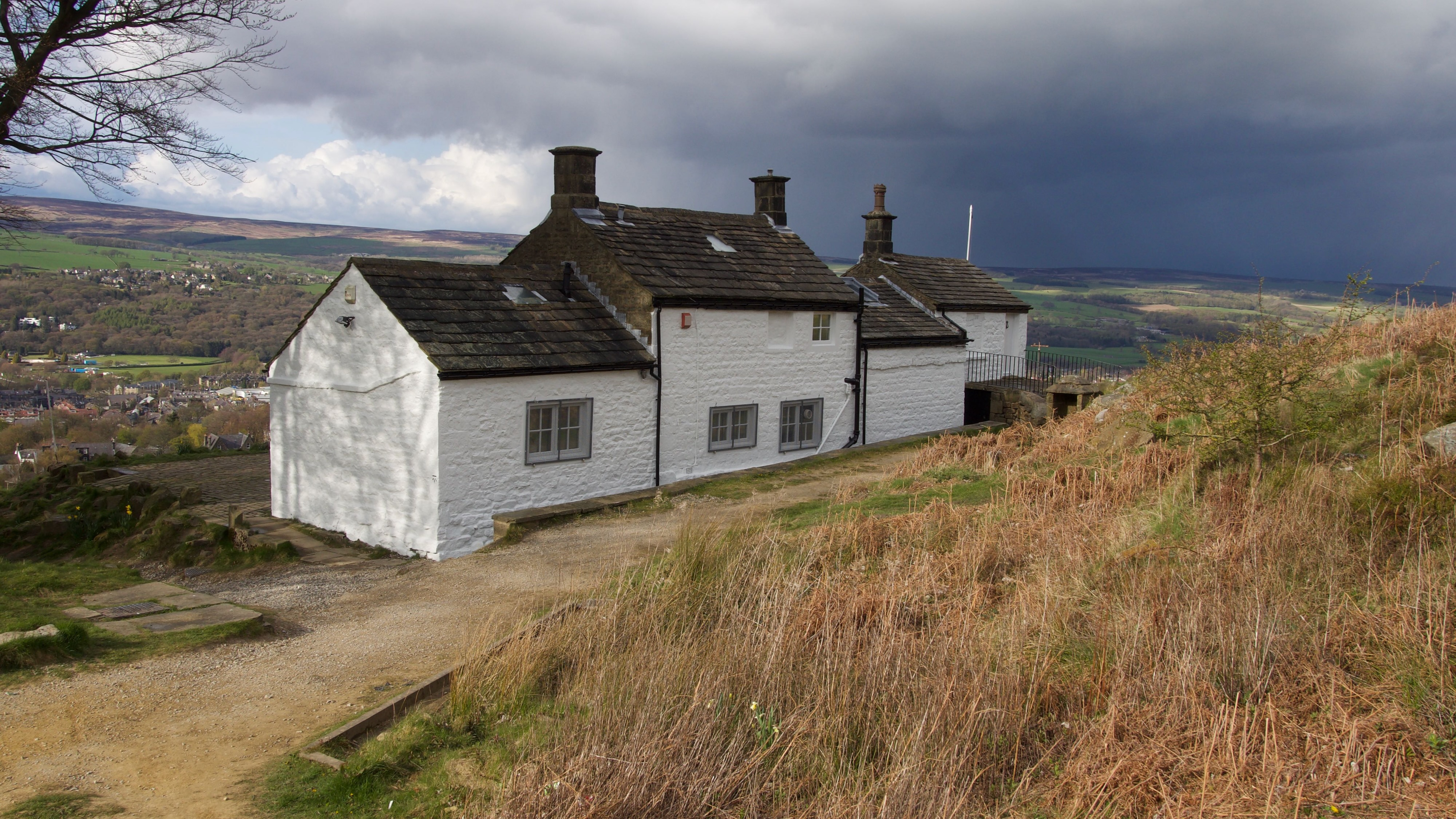
White Wells cottages, as they appear today.

White Wells is a spa bath on Ilkley Moor in West Yorkshire, England.

White Wells was built around 1700 at the back of the current Spa Cottage as an open air spa bath. They were later enclosed, A single plunge pool survives today inside the Cottage.

== History ==
The original White Wells spa bath was built by landowner Peter Middleton (c.1655-1714).

In 1791, Robert Dale built two baths on the current site, enclosed by walls on three sides but not roofed over. Dale placed an advertisement in the Leeds Intelligencer of 26 April 1791 in which he claimed that the medicinal properties of the 'Spaw' could heal 'bad eyes', 'tumours and sores', 'scrophula' and 'all cases where the spine is affected.[sic]'

In 1793. Anne Harper, the nine year old daughter of butcher William Harper, drowned in the spa bath. The Spa Cottage contains a memorial plaque dedicated to Harper.

== New Year's Day ==
The plunge pool is used to welcome in the New Year and is noted as the most popular day of the year for plunging.

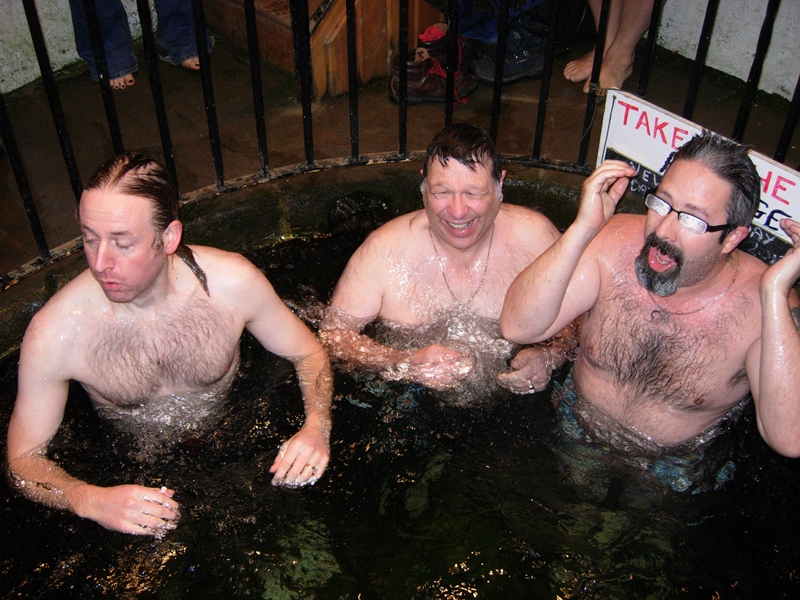
People plunging in the spa pool, New Year's Day 2012

== See also ==
- Listed buildings in Ilkley
