= Ilkley Town Hall =

Municipal building in Ilkley, West Yorkshire, England

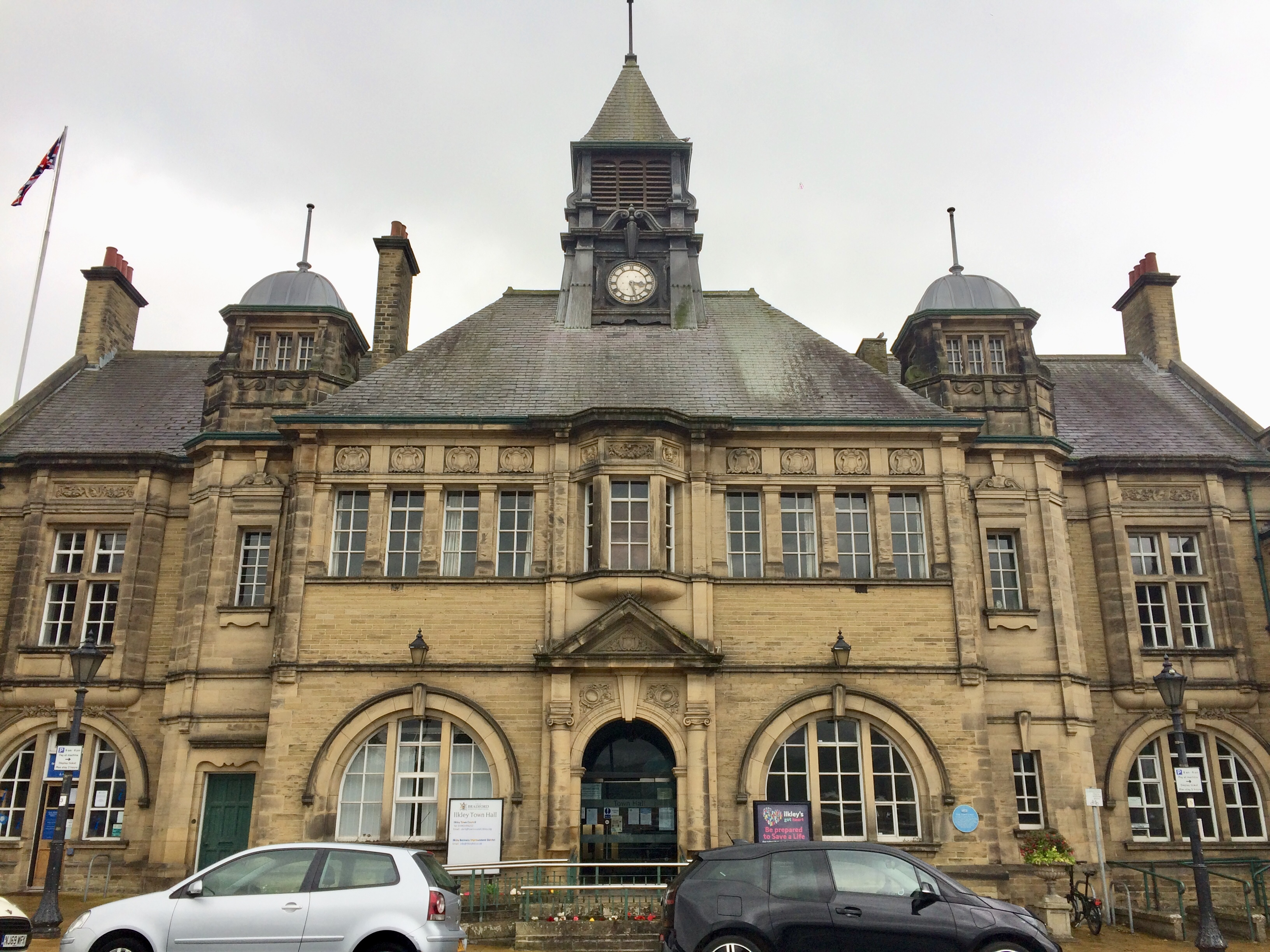
- Ilkley Town Hall from Station Road in 2020

General information
- Architectural style: Mixed, Franco-Flemish classical
- Classification

Listed Building – Grade II
- Designated: 20 May 1976
- Reference no.: 1314237
- Location: Ilkley, England
- Coordinates: 53.924230°N 1.821060°W
- Construction started: 1906
- Opened: 27 April 1908
- Cost: £10,053

Design and construction
- Architect: William Bakewell

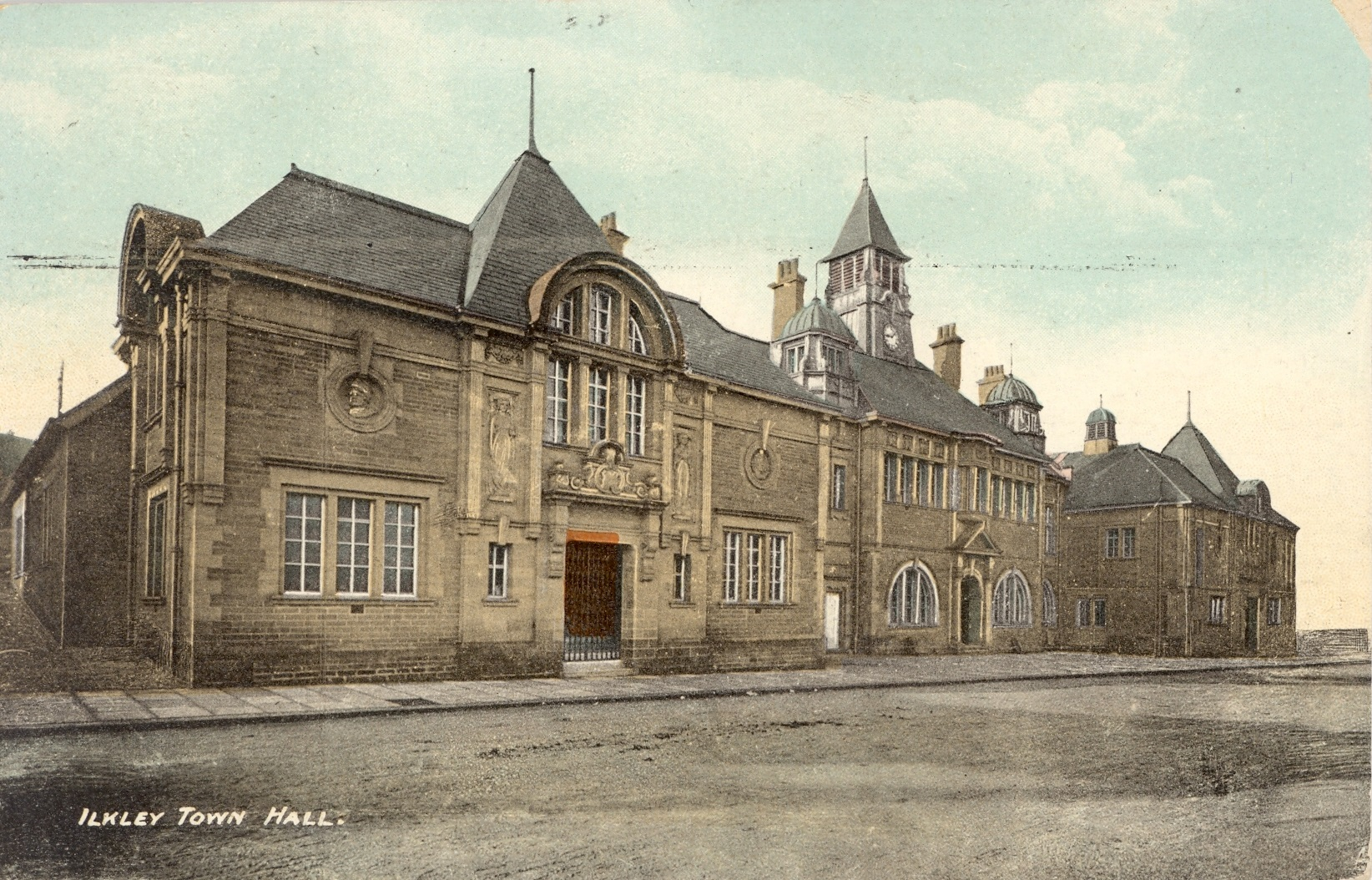
Postcard of the new buildings from Station Road. From L-R: library, Town Hall, King's Hall. Winter Garden was added to the right in 1914.

Ilkley Town Hall, on Station Road, Ilkley, West Yorkshire, is a Grade II listed municipal building designed by William Bakewell of Leeds. It forms the centre of a small complex of public buildings, which also includes Ilkley Library (a Carnegie library), and the King's Hall & Winter Garden theatre. The library, Town Hall and King's Hall opened in 1908 opposite Ilkley railway station; the Winter Garden was added to the west in 1914.

== Description ==
The frontage to Station Road is a symmetrical composition featuring the central Town Hall, with two wings – the library to the left and the King's Hall to the right. Everything is of two storeys and constructed of local ashlar stone with mullioned windows and steep, hipped slate roofs. The main entrance is recessed within Ionic columns and topped with a pediment. The roof ridge contains a central clock turret, containing an illuminated hour-striking clock and bell installed in 1907 by Potts & Sons of Leeds.

The Winter Garden, which being a later addition does not form part of the symmetrical layout, is attached to the right-hand side in a similar style. It has a decorated metal canopy which projects over the pavement.

== History ==
=== Background ===
Governance in Ilkley began with the Local Board established in 1848, which held meetings above a shop in Brook Street. The Board was replaced in 1894 by Ilkley Urban District Council (UDC), which met in rented rooms on The Grove. The town, which being a fashionable, affluent spa resort on the southern edge of the Yorkshire Dales with a population of 7,455, lacked the status symbol of proper public buildings, and the UDC was in need of a permanent base from which to administer the town. There was also no free public library (though a private library was open to subscribers) or municipal assembly hall.

=== Design and construction ===
The Sedbergh Estate, which was opposite the railway station and formerly owned by the leading Bradford businessman Edward Hirst Wade, contained a farmyard with the crumbling Sedbergh House and various broken-down outbuildings. In July 1896, John Thomas Jackson, a local businessman and councillor, bought the estate at auction for £7,800, and sold part of it on to Ilkley UDC in March 1897 for £6270. The Council swiftly demolished Sedbergh House to allow for Station Road to be widened, but for several years allowed the future town hall site to lie empty while debate continued about what size and design it should take. The Council finally decided to move forward with building on the site in 1902, now with Cllr Jackson as its chair, after learning of the possibility of a generous donation from Andrew Carnegie, a philanthropist who endowed 660 libraries in Britain.

In November 1903, the UDC promoted an architectural competition with a prize of £100 to design a town hall, library and assembly hall. Holding competitions was a popular method of getting the best design from a surplus of architects; sixty entries were received. The assessor and judge of the competition was George Bertram Bulmer, President of the Leeds and Yorkshire Architectural Society. In May 1904 it was announced first place should go to William Bakewell of Leeds, second place to Reginald T Longden of Burslem, Stoke-on-Trent, and third place to Warwick & Hall of London. Bakewell's design, entitled "Economy", was one of Edwardian elegance.

The estimated cost before construction was £13,000 (equivalent to £1,769,000 in 2023). The finance for the buildings came from two main sources: £3,000 for the library was donated by Andrew Carnegie, and the outstanding £10,000 from a 30-year bank loan to the UDC. As it was a time of economic depression, contracts were awarded to local builders, with stipulations that workers should be paid at least the local rate, and with the mason bound to use stone from local quarries on Ilkley Moor.

In April 1905 a deputation of ratepayers presented a petition to postpone building. They were concerned by a severe depression in trade, the reduction in rates because of empty houses, an abnormal increase in poor and education rates and the special Boer War taxes. Nevertheless, the sanction to borrow the requisite £10,000 was received in July and the contractors were appointed to begin work in August. A foundation stone laying ceremony was held in 1906, carried out by Councillor Jackson.

Further funding was found to be required to purchase additional land to the rear to make space for a stage in the King's Hall, and construction was also delayed when an accident occurred in January 1907; a cornice stone was being hoisted into position when it fell through the scaffolding, which collapsed. Four men fell, two men were trapped under the stone and killed.

=== Opening ===
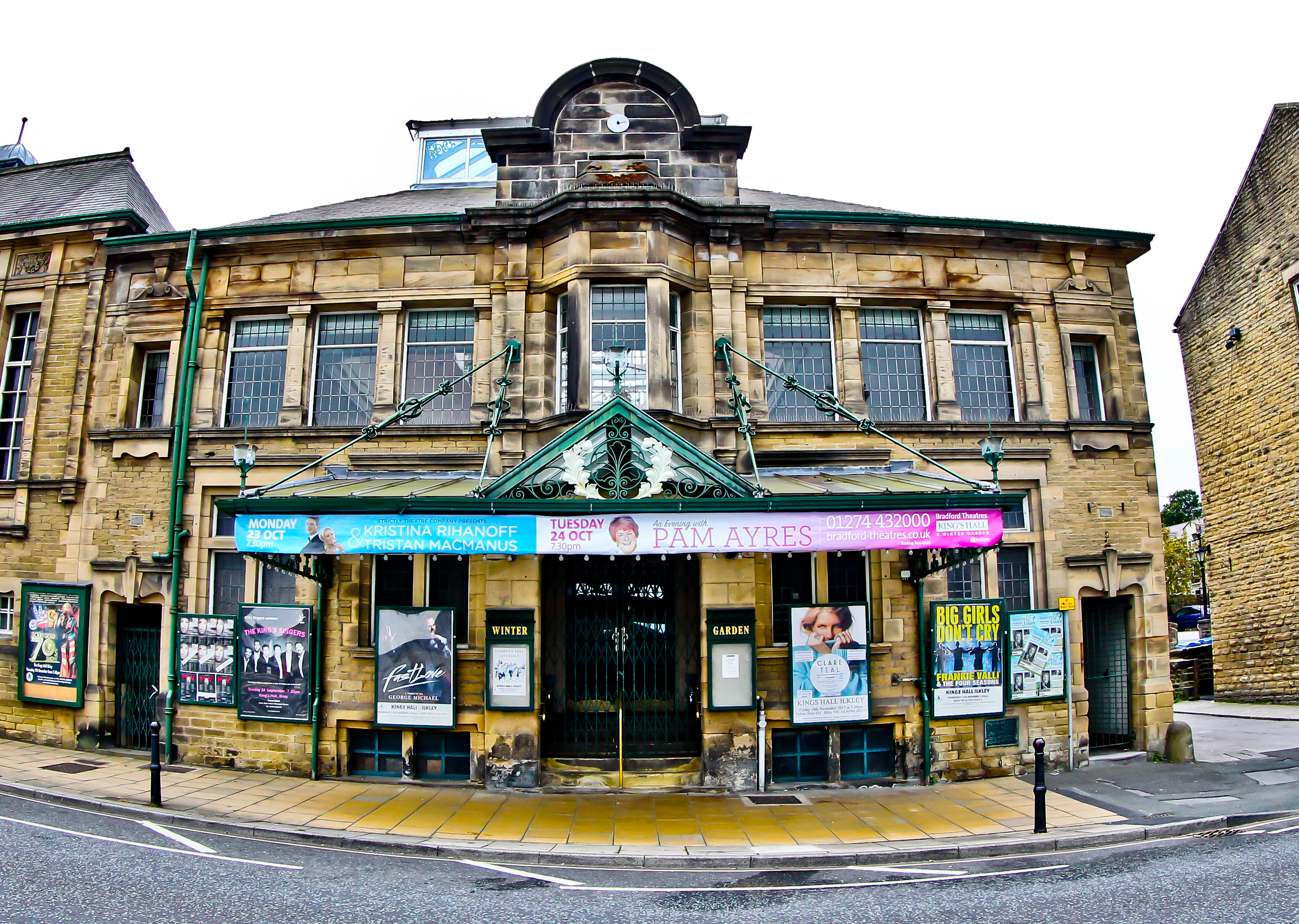
The Winter Garden theatre entrance in 2017, to the west of the King's Hall

As soon as 5 October 1907, the library was opened, though the building was incomplete, by Robert Collyer, a well-known Unitarian clergyman, when he was visiting England from America to receive a doctorate from the University of Leeds. This was followed by the opening of Town Hall on 27 April 1908 by Jackson, who was presented with a key of solid silver and fine gilt. At this celebration, the members of the Council gave speeches and walked down The Grove in procession from their former rented premises to the new building, which was illuminated in the evening by flashing electric lights. The adjacent King's Hall also opened in 1908 and gave the town a venue for theatrical productions and public meetings. Celebrations relating to the openings included a half-day paid holiday for local residents and a free performance for ratepayers of The Belle of Mayfair.

As part of its research for the new building, council members had visited other local town halls, and had admired the recently rebuilt council chamber in Batley. This led to the order of its furniture from Waring & Gillow. The interior had cost £3,900 to furnish and the fitting out was complete by the time of the Ilkley UDC's first council meeting in the new chamber on 6 May 1908. It occupied the building until abolition in 1974, when its functions were taken by City of Bradford Metropolitan District Council. An Ilkley Town Council was re-established for the parish, which now uses the meeting room, retaining its original furniture, oak panelling and central lantern light.

=== Later history ===
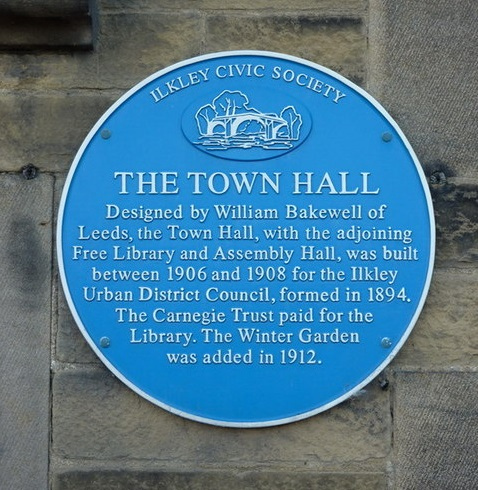
Blue plaque erected by Ilkley Civic Society and unveiled by Alan Titchmarsh in 2004

Subsequent to opening, the King's Hall was the location of various rallies, including ones addressed by Suffragette Adela Pankhurst, William Booth of The Salvation Army, and Robert Baden-Powell. It has also held the Wharfedale Music Festival since opening, and had cinema equipment installed in 1910. To its west was a terrace garden which was replaced by the Winter Garden, opening with another ceremony on 22 June 1914, coinciding with the official birthday celebrations of George V. This acted as an annexe to the King's Hall for meetings, dances (sprung floor) and refreshment serving.

The Town Hall complex is recorded in the National Heritage List for England as a Grade II listed building, having been designated on 20 May 1976. Grade II is the lowest of the three grades of listing, and is applied to "buildings that are nationally important and of special interest". The Winter Garden was given a separate listing on the same date, also at Grade II.

In 1991, the fine key from the 1908 opening ceremony of the Town Hall surfaced in an Alaskan antiques dealership. It had been presented by the architect to Jackson, the driving force behind the creation of the municipal building, and bore detailed enamel work of a photograph of the buildings, the seal of the council, and a portrait of Jackson. It was designed by J W Hudson, a watchmaker and jeweller on Brook Street, and expresses civic pride and gratitude.

A local cultural charity group named the Friends of the King's Hall and Winter Garden was set up in 2000 due to anxieties about neglect of the buildings' condition. It co-operates closely with the officers of Bradford Metropolitan District Council, and raises money to fund restorations and refurbishments.

Currently, the Town Hall is home to Ilkley Visitor Information Centre, Town Clerk's office, and Town Council's meeting chamber. Further services were provided by Bradford MDC until 2014, such as a staffed reception and cash office, but withdrew these, stating "the limited public use of the reception does not justify staff costs".

== See also ==
- Listed buildings in Ilkley
