= Ben Rhydding =

Village in West Yorkshire, England

Coordinates: 53.924697°N 1.798911°W

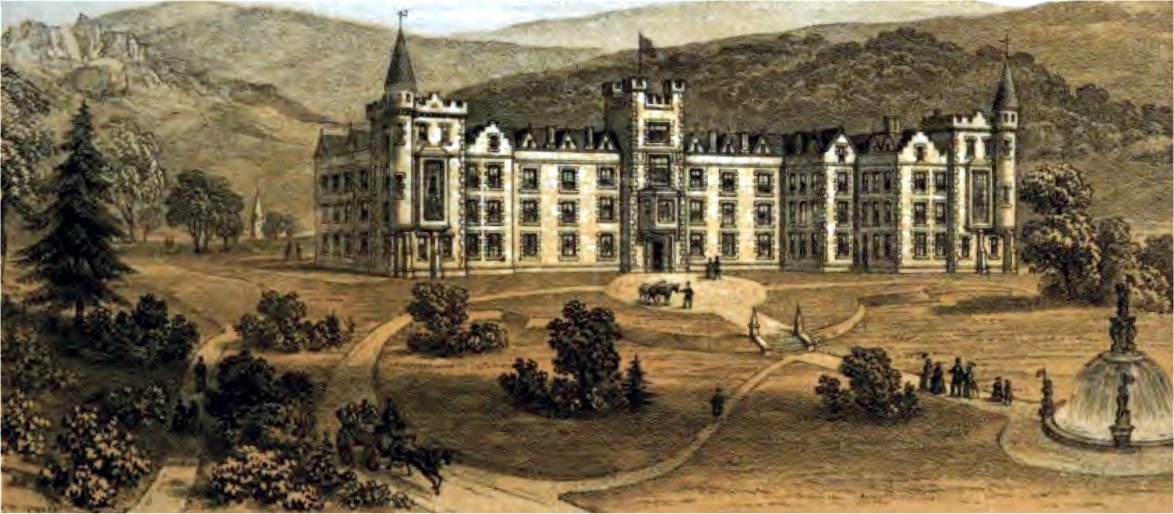
- The Ben Rhydding Hydro circa 1858 – since demolished

- Location within West Yorkshire
- OS grid reference: SE13304763
- Civil parish: Ilkley
- Metropolitan borough: City of Bradford
- Metropolitan county: West Yorkshire
- Region: Yorkshire and the Humber
- Country: England
- Sovereign state: United Kingdom
- Post town: ILKLEY
- Postcode district: LS29
- Dialling code: 01943
- Police: West Yorkshire
- Fire: West Yorkshire
- Ambulance: Yorkshire
- UK Parliament: Keighley and Ilkley

Ben Rhydding is a village in the City of Bradford, West Yorkshire, England. It is part of the Ilkley urban area and civil parish.

The village is situated on a north-facing valley side beneath the Cow and Calf rocks and above and to the south of the River Wharfe. It was in the historic West Riding of Yorkshire.

== History ==
The village's former name was Wheatley. In the 19th century it was noted for its hydropathic establishment, the Ben Rhydding Hydro, which opened on 29 March 1844 at a cost of £30,000. It was the third major hydropathic establishment in England, "perhaps the most deeply respected and certainly the longest-lived". Ben Rhydding, the name given to the establishment, also given to the railway station built to serve it and by which the village subsequently became known, is allegedly the ancient name of the uplands above Wheatley. In a 1900 history of Upper Wharfedale, a footnote describes the circumstances, citing Collyer's History of Ilkley:

Dr. Collyer writes that when Ben Rhydding was building, and the founders were casting about for a name, the matter came up in the "pint-pot parliament", which had sat at the Wheat Sheaf in Ilkley time out of mind. Mr. Hamer Stansfeld (the founder) wanted "a good an ancient name", and was particularly wishful to know what the upland was called in the old times on which Ben Rhydding is built. Nancy Wharton, our hostess, said she knew, and gave us the name Ben (not Bean) Rydding [sic]. It had passed out the common memory, but had survived by some good hap in Nancy's mind, and it was from this little seed the name sprang again which has become famous.

== Amenities ==
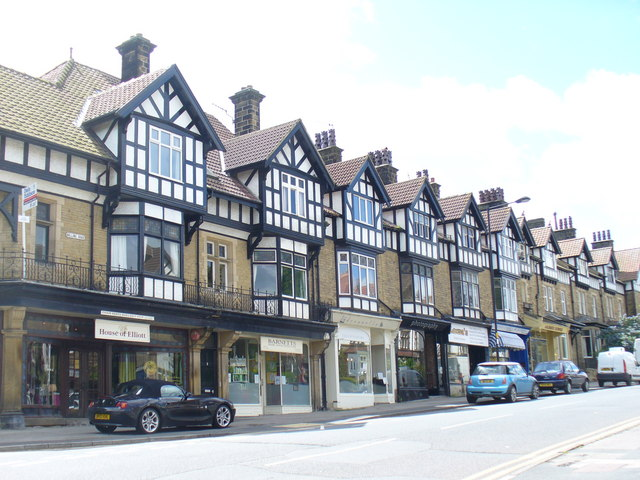
Suburban shopping parade on Bolling Road, Ben Rhydding

Ben Rhydding is served by a railway station, public house, two petrol stations, two churches and local shops but relying on nearby Ilkley for shopping and civic facilities.

== Sport ==
Ilkley Town A.F.C. is a football club based at Coutances Way, and compete in the Northern Counties East League.

Ben Rhydding Hockey Club is a field hockey club that is based at Countances Way, and competes in the Men's England Hockey League, the Women's England Hockey League, the North Hockey League and the Yorkshire & North East Hockey League.

Ben Rhydding Cricket Club is also based at Coutances Way.

== See also ==
- Listed buildings in Ilkley
