= History of Ilkley =

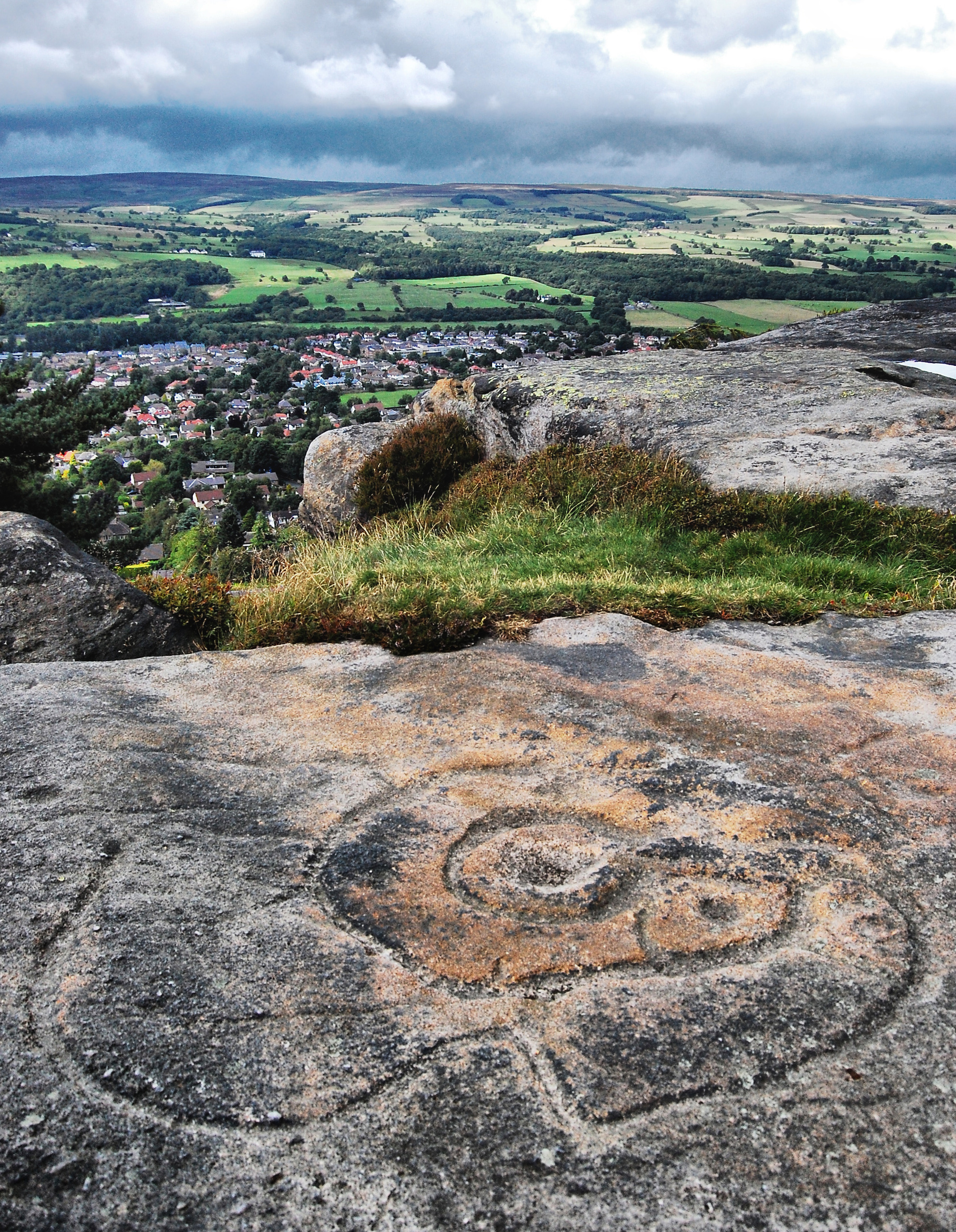
Bronze Age markings at Hangingstone Quarry, above Ilkley

Ilkley is a town and civil parish in West Yorkshire, in the north of England. It has been inhabited since at least the Mesolithic period; was the site of a Roman fort; and much later was an early example of a spa town. In more recent times it serves as a residential district within the travel to work areas of Bradford, Leeds and Keighley.

Early variants of the place name 'Ilkley' include Hillicleg (c. 972) and Illiclei (Domesday Book). These possibly denote a "woodland clearing of a man called Yllica or Illica" (Old English person's name + lēah).

== Prehistory ==
The earliest evidence of habitation in the Ilkley area is flint arrowheads or microliths, dating to the Mesolithic period, from about 11,000 BC onwards. A selection of arrowheads and information about prehistoric Ilkley can be seen in the Heritage Room at Ilkley Manor House. The area around Ilkley has been continuously settled since at least the early Bronze Age, around 1800 BC; more than 250 cup and ring marks, and a curved swastika carving dating to the period, have been found on rock outcrops, and archaeological remains of dwellings are found on Ilkley Moor. A druidical stone circle, the Twelve Apostles Stone Circle, was constructed 2,000 years ago. Serious interest in the rock art of Ilkley began after the publication in 1879, by John Romilly Allen, of "The Prehistoric Rock Sculptures of Ilkley" in The Journal of the British Archaeological Association.

Robert Collyer notes that Ilkley was at the centre of the territory of the Brigantes, and states that it was one of ten strongholds of the tribe. He notes that the town was on a pre-Roman trackway running from the north through Catterick to Chester and Holyhead.

== Roman period ==
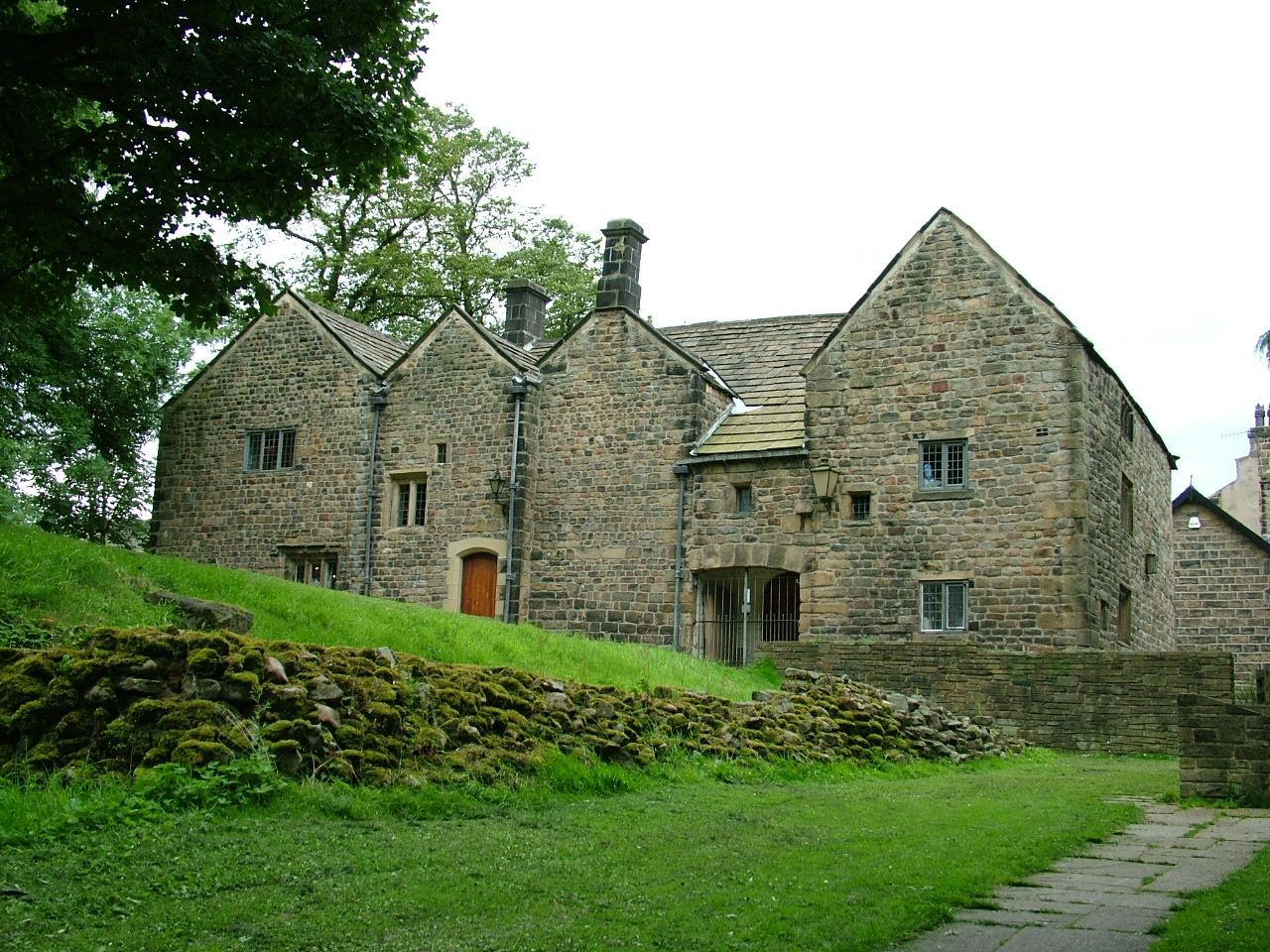
Remains of a Roman wall located to the south of the Manor House, Ilkley

Ilkley had traditionally been identified with the Olicana of Ptolemy's Geography, but an inscription on the "Verbeia Stone" puts this into question (see below). The same inscription now lends Roman Ilkley the name by which it is generally referred: Verbeia. 'Olicana' is now generally identified with Olenacum (Elslack, near Skipton, North Yorkshire).

In the Roman period, Ilkley lay at a crossroads of Roman roads, connecting to Catterick and Adel; Skipton and Gisburn; Aldborough, Knaresborough and Blubberhouses; and Morton leading to Manchester.

The remains of a Roman fort exist on a site now near the centre of the town. The fort went through several stages of construction, destruction, and reconstruction, as attested by various dedication inscriptions. The first fort was timber-built in c. 80 AD, and then abandoned c. 100. It was reoccupied in 169, burnt down c. 196–7, and rebuilt in stone before the end of January 198. A final rebuilding and reorganisation of the fort occurred c. 300.

The fort is small, roughly 2.75 acres (1.11 ha), and occupies a steep bank above the River Wharfe, with the river on the north side. Its east and west sides are bounded by two brooks, which flow north to the Wharfe. The foundations of the fort on the bank are very conspicuous, and remains of Roman brick, glass, and earthenware have been found on the edges of the brow. The Medieval Ilkley Manor House and All Saints Parish Church stand within the precincts of the fort.

A number of Roman altars, inscriptions, and monuments have been discovered in Ilkley. Perhaps the most notable is the 'Verbeia Stone', a gritstone altar with an inscription, the translation of which reads: "Sacred to Verbeia: Clodius Fronto, prefect of the Second Cohort of Lingonians (set this up)". Verbeia was the Romano-British goddess of the River Wharfe; her name potentially being etymologically related to that of the river. A statue found near the altar may have represented her; the figure, with stylised features and an over-large head, wears a pleated robe and holds a snake in each hand. It is possible that Verbeia is the same deity as Boand, a pre-Christian Irish goddess of the Boyne River. A 1608 replica of the Verbeia Stone, commissioned by William Middleton of Myddelton Lodge, is kept alongside the original altar in the Heritage Room of Ilkley Manor House.

An early second or late first century sandstone tombstone is Ilkley's only known Roman epigraph to make reference to civilian life. The tombstone bears the relief of a woman wearing a tunic, sitting in a rounded chair. Her hair is in long plaits, which she holds in her hands. The fragmentary inscription reads: "To the spirits of the departed: Ved[.]ic[..], daughter of …, aged 30, a tribeswoman of the Cornovii, lies here". This tombstone is also kept in Ilkley Manor House.

== Anglo-Saxon period ==
Collyer notes that there is not one sure word about Ilkley in the 800 years after the improvement of the fort by Virius Lupus; but that by the Norman period the area had an Anglo-Saxon name, derived from the Roman and Old British names; was a parish with church and priest; and contained four centres of life and industry, namely Ilkley, Nessfield, Middleton and Stubham. He conjectures that Ilkley's place on the track and road system of the time would have meant that it was affected by the waves of invasions of Britain which took place throughout the Dark Ages, with Angles, Saxons and Danes settling and bequeathing names to the locality, whilst at the same time perhaps squeezing out the indigenous population and those of Roman descent.

Ilkley's Anglo-Saxon church is taken by Collyer to date to a consecration in 627, and most probably arising out of preaching by Paulinus Three Anglo-Saxon crosses formerly in the churchyard of All Saints, but now removed into the church to prevent erosion, date to the 8th century.

== Norman period and the Middelton family ==
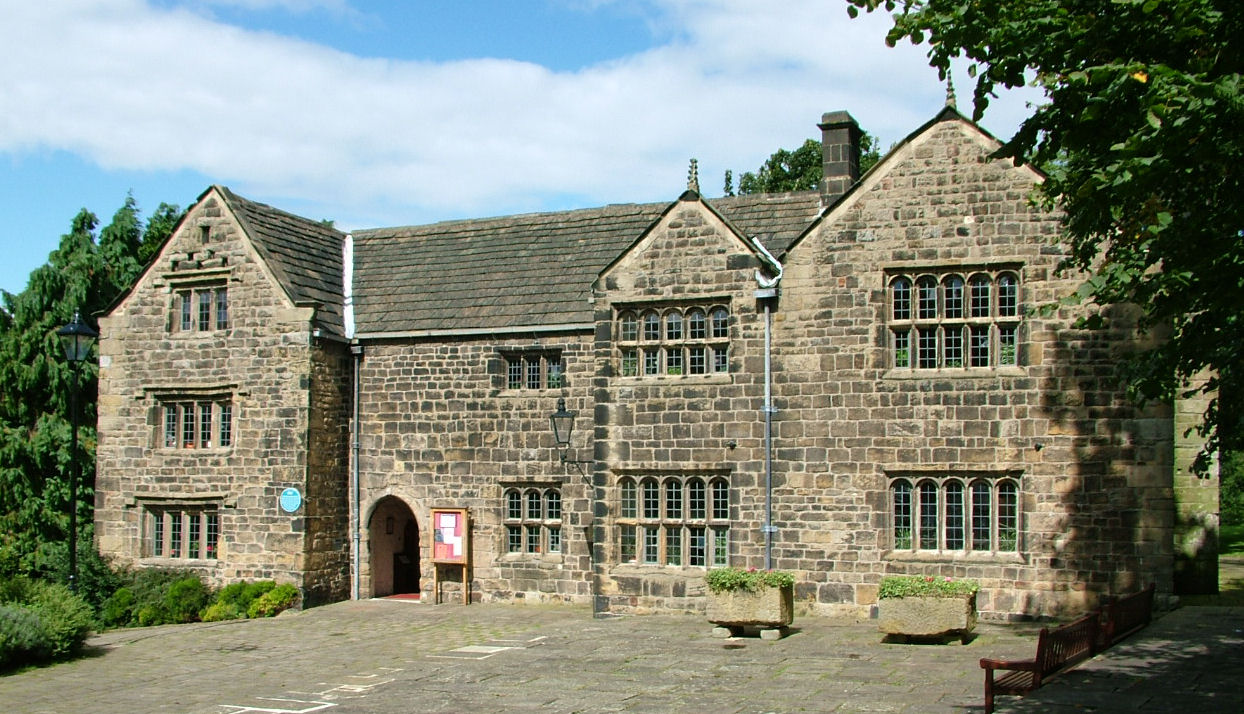
The Manor House, Ilkley

Ilkley formed part of the Wapentake of Skyrack; its lands to the north of the river fell into the wapentake of Claro. In Domesday Book, dating to 1086, Ilkley (Ilecliue/Illecliue/Illiclei/Illicleia) is listed as being in the possession of William de Percy, 1st Baron Percy. By 1242 the land had passed to the Kyme family, of whose number Philip de Kyme appointed the first rector of the parish church on 11 December. The land was acquired by the Middelton family of Myddelton Lodge, from about a century after the time of William the Conqueror. The family lost possession through a series of land sales and mortgage repossessions throughout a period of about a hundred years from the early 19th century. The agents of William Middelton (1815–1885) were responsible for the design of the new town of Ilkley to replace the village which had stood there before.

== Spa town and the railway ==
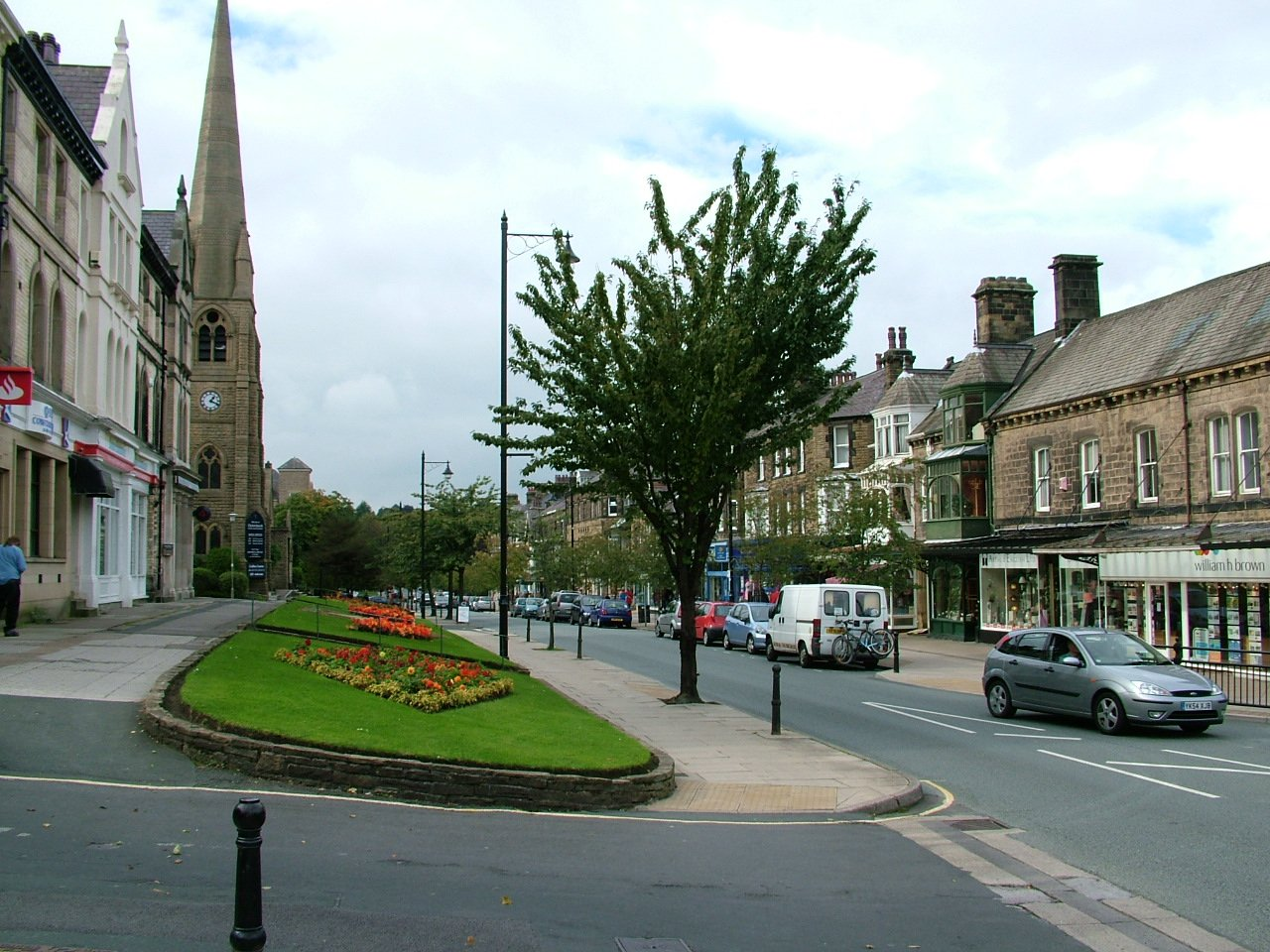
The Grove, Ilkley's principal shopping street, designed with wide pavements for promenading

In the 17th and 18th centuries the town gained a reputation for the efficacy of its water. The Middleton family constructed and for many years maintained White Wells, an early example of a spa building containing dressing rooms and a bath fed from a spring, in the 18th century. The Middletons encouraged visitors by permitting shooting on the manor and fishing in the river. Prior to the spa boom, however, Ilkley was "a little, old and ragged village" of single-storey thatched cottages.

In the 19th century the town became established as a fashionable spa town, with the construction a mile to the east of the town, at Wheatley, of the vast Ben Rhydding Hydro or Hydropathic Establishment between 1843 and 1844. Tourists flocked here to "take the waters" and bathe in the cold water spring. Wheatley today is called Ben Rhydding after the Hydro (since demolished).

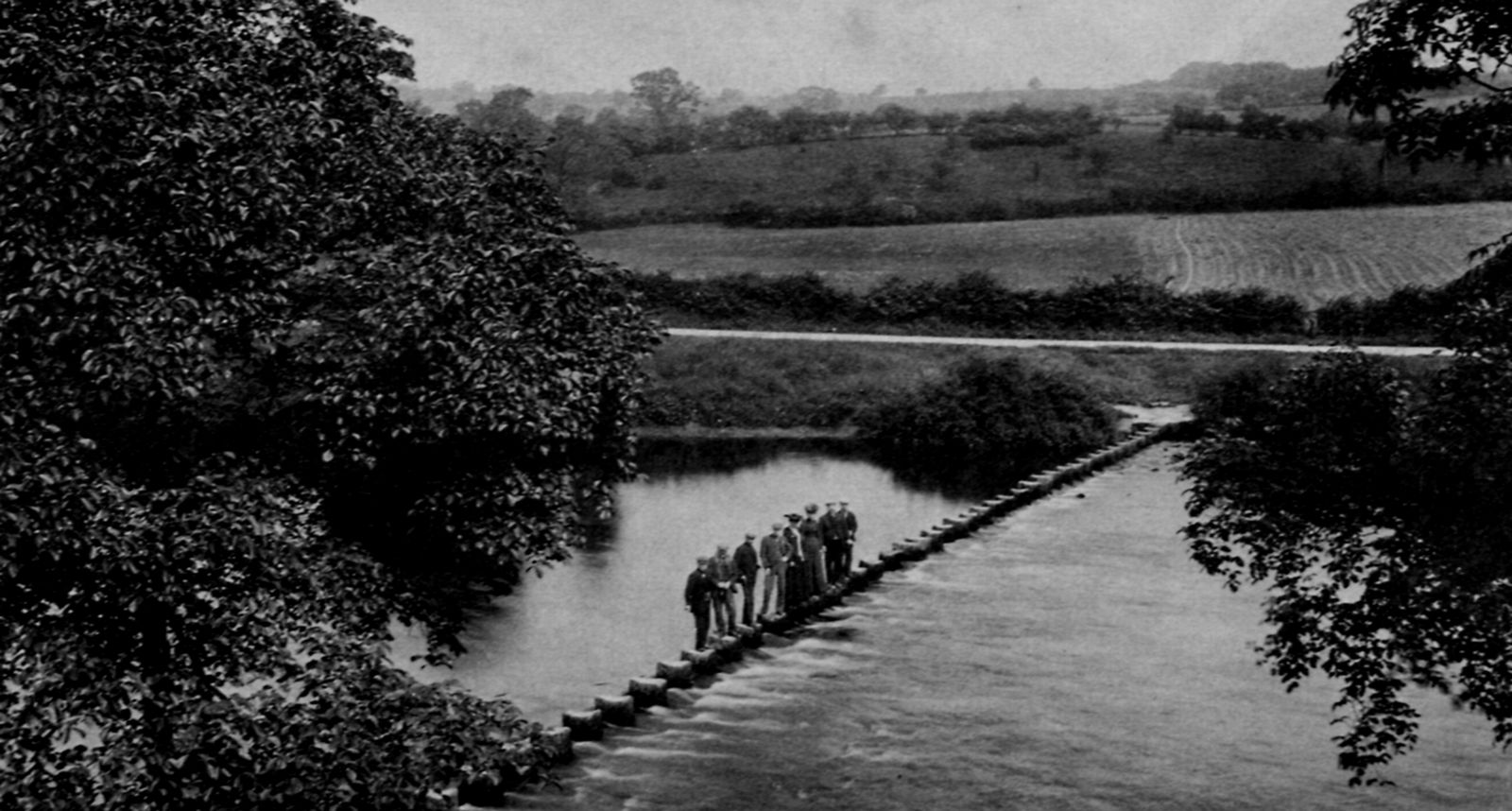
Ilkley Stepping Stones (period 1850–98) by Francis Frith

Development based on the Hydro movement, and upon the establishment of a number of convalescent homes and hospitals, was accelerated when the railway from Leeds and Bradford opened in 1865. Charles Darwin underwent hydropathic treatment at Wells House when his book On the Origin of Species was published on 24 November 1859, staying with his family at the nearby North View House (now Hillside Court). Other Victorian visitors to the town include Madame Tussaud. Today, the only remaining Hydro is the white cottage known as White Wells House, which can be seen and visited on the edge of the moor overlooking the town.

== 20th century ==
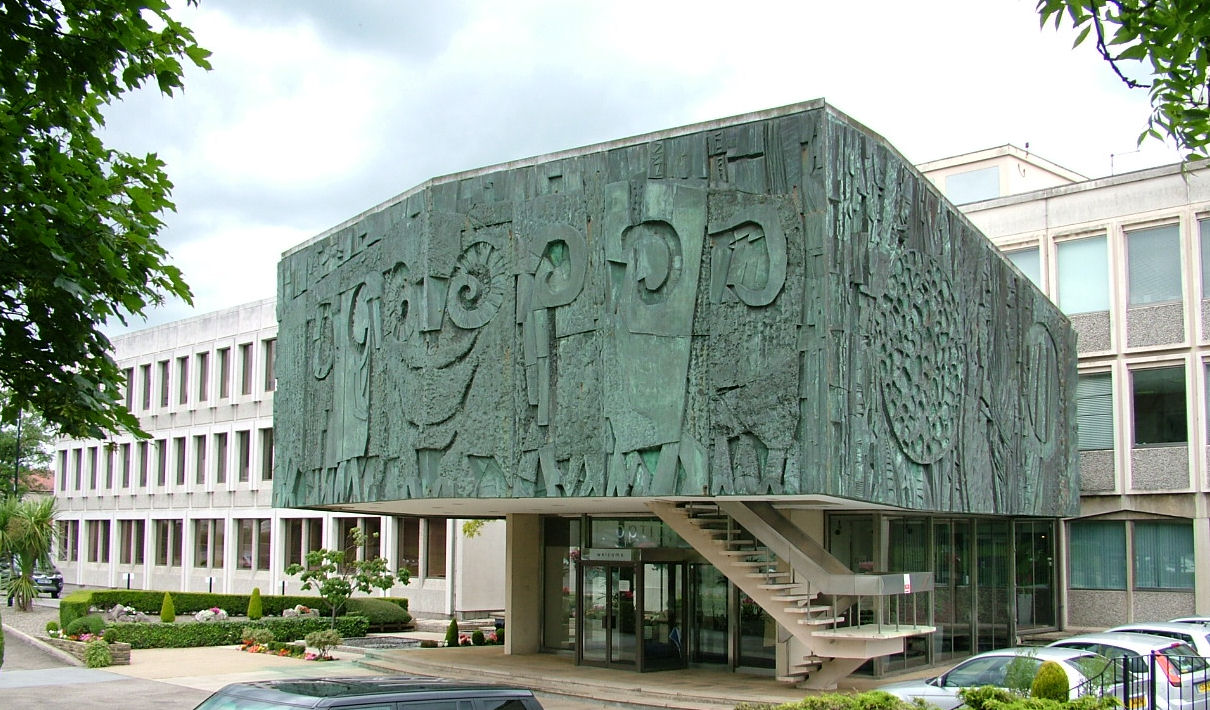
International Wool Secretariat building in Ben Rhydding, Ilkley

During 1906–08 architect Edwin Lutyens built Heathcote, a particularly large Neoclassical style villa, for John Thomas Hemingway, a Bradford wool merchant. It is a Grade II* listed building.

T. S. Eliot in 1916 delivered six extension lectures in Ilkley, on the theme of modern French literature. He considered Wensleydale to be the "Mozart of cheeses".

Between 5 and 17 August 1923, philosopher and educator Rudolf Steiner delivered a series of fourteen lectures at Ilkley which were published as A Modern Art of Education. They provided a comprehensive overview of Waldorf education. In his report of the event, which embodies the language of his distinctive philosophical approach, he commented on the town's archaeological heritage:

in the remains of dolmens and old Druidic altars lying around everywhere, [Ilkley] has traces of something that reminds one of the ancient spirituality that has, however, no successors. It is most moving to have on the one hand the impression [of the industrialism] I just described and then, on the other, to climb a hill in this region so filled with the effects of those impressions and then find in those very characteristic places the remains of ancient sacrificial altars marked with appropriate signs.

In 1967 Jimi Hendrix played at the Troutbeck Hotel, now a nursing home, although the show was cut short by the police. The local newspaper headline read "Pop Fans Ran Amok in Hotel" after audience members allegedly ripped off doors, pulled out electrical fittings and smashed furniture after a police sergeant stepped on stage and stopped Hendrix midway through a number.

1973 saw the start of the annual Ilkley Literature Festival, the largest in Northern England. W. H. Auden gave his last English reading there that same year.

There was an alleged UFO incident on Ilkley Moor on 1 December 1987. A retired police officer claimed that he was abducted by aliens while on a morning walk and briefly held on their craft before being returned to the moor. The man took a photograph of the moor which he said shows one of the aliens that abducted him.
