= List of museums in West Yorkshire =

This list of museums in West Yorkshire, England contains museums which are defined for this context as institutions (including nonprofit organisations, government entities, and private businesses) that collect and care for objects of cultural, artistic, scientific, or historical interest and make their collections or related exhibits available for public viewing. Also included are non-profit art galleries and university art galleries. Museums that exist only online (i.e., virtual museums) are not included.

Name	Image	Town/City	Region	Type	Summary
Abbey House Museum		Kirkstall	City of Leeds	History	Victorian-period street scenes with shops and house displays,
Bagshaw Museum		Batley	Kirklees	Multiple	Local history, natural history, decorative arts from India, China, Africa and Japan, and an Ancient Egyptian exhibition
Bankfield Museum		Halifax	Calderdale	Multiple	Historic house museum, includes Duke of Wellington's Regiment Museum, textiles, toys and local history exhibits
Batley Art Gallery		Batley	Kirklees	Art	website, Changing exhibitions of art, mainly by local artists and societies. As of July 2025 "currently closed and has no date for re-opening".
Bolling Hall		Bradford	City of Bradford	Historic house	14th-century manor home reflecting five centuries of family life
Bracken Hall Countryside Centre and Museum		Baildon	City of Bradford	Natural history	Natural history, archaeology, geology, local history, nature centre and children's environmental education programs
Bradford Industrial Museum		Eccleshill	City of Bradford	Industry	Features relics of local industry, especially printing and textile machinery, kept in working condition for regular demonstrations to the public, also vehicles including classic cars, motor bikes, bicycles, buses, trams and a locomotive
Bramham Park		Bramham	City of Leeds	Historic house	Early-18th-century Baroque mansion
Brontë Parsonage Museum		Haworth	City of Bradford	Biographical	Lives and novels of the Brontë family
Bullecourt Museum		Milnsbridge	Kirklees	Military	Military artefacts
Calderdale Industrial Museum		Halifax	Calderdale	Industrial	Industrial heritage
Cartwright Hall		Bradford	City of Bradford	Art	Civic art gallery, collection includes Victorian and Edwardian works, Old Masters, 20th-century British painters and sculptors, Asian art and textiles
Castleford Forum Museum		Castleford	City of Wakefield	Local	History of Castleford, from the Bronze Age to the modern day; local library below.
Cliffe Castle Museum		Keighley	City of Bradford	Multiple	19th-century Victorian, neo-Gothic castle with period rooms, exhibits of local history, natural history, geology, crafts and trades, archaeology, Ancient Egypt, stained glass, costumes, local pottery
Colne Valley Museum		Golcar	Kirklees	Industry	Three converted 19th-century weaver's cottages with 1850s weaving equipment and period rooms
Colour Experience		Bradford	City of Bradford	Education	Visual displays and exhibits showing how the eyes perceive colour, visitors need to pre-book
David Brown Tractor Club Museum		Meltham	Kirklees	Agriculture	David Brown tractors and memorabilia
Dean Clough		Halifax	Calderdale	Art	Former 19th-century carpet factory and mill buildings now housing art galleries, a theatre and music spaces, as well as offices
Dewsbury Bus Museum		Dewsbury	Kirklees	Transportation	website, preserved bus and coach collection, displayed on open days and events. School visits available
Dewsbury Minster		Dewsbury	Kirklees	Religious	website, heritage centre exhibits about the church's history
East Riddlesden Hall		Keighley	City of Bradford	Historic house	Operated by the National Trust, 17th-century manor house, gardens
Elizabeth Love Museum		Pontefract	Wakefield	History and Antiques	website, An extensive Castleford pottery collection, Longcase clocks, furniture and Objet D'art within the Pontefract Castle's Guardhouse
Eureka! The National Children's Museum		Halifax	Calderdale	Children's	Focus on play based learning and informal learning experiences
Fulneck Moravian Museum		Fulneck Moravian Settlement	City of Leeds	Ethnic	website, Moravian memorabilia, embroidery and crafts, Victorian parlour and kitchen, historic local artefacts, 1822 hand-pulled fire engine
Gallery II		Bradford	City of Bradford	Art	Contemporary art gallery at the University of Bradford
Gissing Centre		Wakefield	City of Wakefield	Biographical	Childhood home and exhibits about novelist George Gissing, operated by the Wakefield Historical Society
Gibson Mill		Hebden Bridge	Calderdale	Local	Operated by the National Trust, 19th-century textile mill visitor centre with local history exhibits, located in Hardcastle Crags
Harewood House		Harewood	City of Leeds	Historic house	18th-century grand country house designed by architects John Carr and Robert Adam, furniture by Thomas Chippendale and grounds by Capability Brown, features a bird garden
Henry Moore Institute in Leeds		Leeds	City of Leeds	Art	Sculpture gallery
Heptonstall Museum		Heptonstall	Calderdale	Local	Local history
The Hepworth Wakefield		Wakefield	City of Wakefield	Art	Art gallery with collection of sculptures by Barbara Hepworth
Horsforth Village Museum		Horsforth	City of Leeds	Local	information, local history
Huddersfield Art Gallery		Huddersfield	Kirklees	Art	website, collection focus is 20th-century British art, including paintings, drawings, prints and sculpture
Ilkley Toy Museum		Ilkley	City of Bradford	Toy	Toys and dolls dating from 350 BCE to modern times
Ingrow Loco Museum		Ingrow	City of Bradford	Railway	Collection of locomotives, operated by the Bahamas Locomotive Society
Keighley Police Museum		Keighley	City of Bradford	Law enforcement	"Temporarily closed" in 2014.
Keighley and Worth Valley Railway		Oxenhope	City of Bradford	Railway	Heritage railway, Oxenhope railway station features museum of rolling stock, locomotives and artefacts
Kirkstall Abbey		Kirkstall	City of Leeds	Religious	Ruins of a medieval Cistercian monastery, exhibits on the history of the abbey and the lives of the monks
Last of The Summer Wine Exhibition		Holmfirth	Kirklees	Media	Collection of artefacts about the British television sitcom Last of the Summer Wine
Launds Inn Museum		Golcar	Kirklees	Historic house	Restored 14th-century inn with exhibits of local history. As of July 2025 the museum website appears not to have been updated since 2019, but it is still listed in the council's directory.
Leeds Art Gallery		Leeds	City of Leeds	Art	Collection includes 19th- and 20th-century British Art
Leeds City Museum		Leeds	City of Leeds	Multiple	Local history, natural history including Leeds Tiger, archaeology from Ancient Greece and Rome, African artefacts
Leeds College of Art		Leeds	City of Leeds	Art	Presents many contemporary shows each year in two gallery locations
Leeds Industrial Museum at Armley Mills		Armley	City of Leeds	Industry	Includes textile machinery, railway equipment and heavy engineering displays
Lotherton Hall		Aberford	City of Leeds	Historic house	Country house estate with Victorian and Edwardian interior and decorative arts, costume collection, formal and wildflower gardens, wooded grounds, a red deer park and a bird garden
Manor House Museum		Ilkley	City of Bradford	Local	Local history, archaeology, art exhibits
Mental Health Museum		Wakefield	City of Wakefield	Medical	History and artefacts from the West Riding Pauper Lunatic Asylum
Middleton Railway Museum		Hunslet	City of Leeds	Railway	Heritage railway and shed with locomotives and rolling stock
Museum of Rail Travel		Ingrow	City of Bradford	Railway	Historic railway carriages and artefacts
Museum of the History of Science, Technology and Medicine		Leeds	City of Leeds	Education	Part of the University of Leeds; teaching materials, history of education and teaching methods. Was in existence in 2019, current status unknown.
National Coal Mining Museum for England		Overton	City of Wakefield	Mining	Former coal mine with underground tours
National Media Museum		Bradford	City of Bradford	Media	Photography, cinema, television, animation, advertising, and related technology and artefacts
Nostell Priory		Nostell	City of Wakefield	Historic house	Operated by the National Trust, 18th-century Palladian house with interiors by Robert Adam, collection of Chippendale furniture, 18th-century dolls' house, 300 acres (1.2 km^{2}) of parkland
Oakwell Hall		Birstall	Kirklees	Historic house	Elizabethan manor house and period gardens
Otley Museum		Otley	City of Leeds	Local	Local history
Peace Museum		Bradford	City of Bradford	Peace	History and development of peace, non-violence and conflict resolution
Pontefract Museum		Pontefract	City of Wakefield	Local	Local history, mining, culture, archaeology,
Red House Museum		Gomersal	Kirklees	Historic house	1830s cloth merchant's home with Brontë connections
Royal Armouries Museum		Leeds	City of Leeds	Military	Armour, swords, spears, warfare from ancient to modern times
Salts Mill		Saltaire	City of Bradford	Art	19th-century textile mill now housing the 1853 Gallery with works by David Hockney, Gallery 2 with a collection of Saltaire paintings and drawings, and the Saltaire Exhibition with local history exhibits
Shibden Hall		Shibden	Calderdale	Historic house	15th-century timber-framed house, park include West Yorkshire Folk Museum with rural life displays
Smith Art Gallery		Brighouse	Calderdale	Art	Permanent exhibition of Victorian paintings, changing exhibits of local and regional artists
Standedge Tunnel Visitor Centre		Marsden	Kirklees	Transportation	Construction of the Standedge Tunnels and the history and life along the Huddersfield Narrow Canal
Stanley & Audrey Burton Gallery		Leeds	City of Leeds	Art	Part of the University of Leeds, collection includes European and British painting, drawings and prints, dating from the 17th century up to the present day
The Tetley		Leeds	City of Leeds	Art	Centre for contemporary art and learning, located in the former headquarters building for Tetley's Brewery, included the Tetley Collection with relics from the brewery's past; closed 2023.
Temple Newsam House and Estate		Leeds	City of Leeds	Historic house	Tudor-Jacobean house with grounds landscaped by Capability Brown, working rare breeds farm, collections of fine and decorative arts, especially paintings, furniture, silver, ceramics, textiles and wallpapers
Thackray Museum		Leeds	City of Leeds	Medical	History of medicine, including Victorian treatments and patients, childbirth, surgery
Thwaite Mills		Leeds	City of Leeds	Industry	Fully restored working water-powered textile mill and associated buildings
Todmorden Toy & Model Museum		Todmorden	Calderdale	Toy	Shop and museum, includeds toys, model trains; closed 2018.
Tolson Museum		Huddersfield	Kirklees	Multiple	Local history, natural history, transportation, textiles, archaeology
Wakefield Museum		Wakefield	City of Wakefield	Multiple	Local history, culture, natural history collections of Charles Waterton
West Yorkshire Print Workshop		Golcar	Kirklees	Art	Printmaking and crafts art centre with gallery
Yorkshire Sculpture Park		West Bretton	City of Wakefield	Art	Changing exhibits of sculpture, both outdoors and indoors

== Defunct museums ==
- Clarke Hall, Wakefield, 17th-century country house and gardens, closed in 2012
- Harmonium Museum, Saltaire, collection of reed organs and harmoniums, closed in 2011
- Keighley Private Classic Car Museum, Keighley, also known as Yorkshire Car Collection
- Rugby League Heritage Centre, Huddersfield, closed in 2013 due to sale of building, seeking new location
- Transperience, Low Moor, Bradford, closed in 1997
- Wakefield Art Gallery, closed March 2009, collections moving to the Hepworth Wakefield
- Yorkshire Motor Museum, also known as Scopos Mills Motor Museum, Batley, closed in 2010

== See also ==
- Category:Tourist attractions in West Yorkshire
