= Wakefield Museum =

Local museum in Wakefield, England

Coordinates: 53.68405°N 1.503781°W

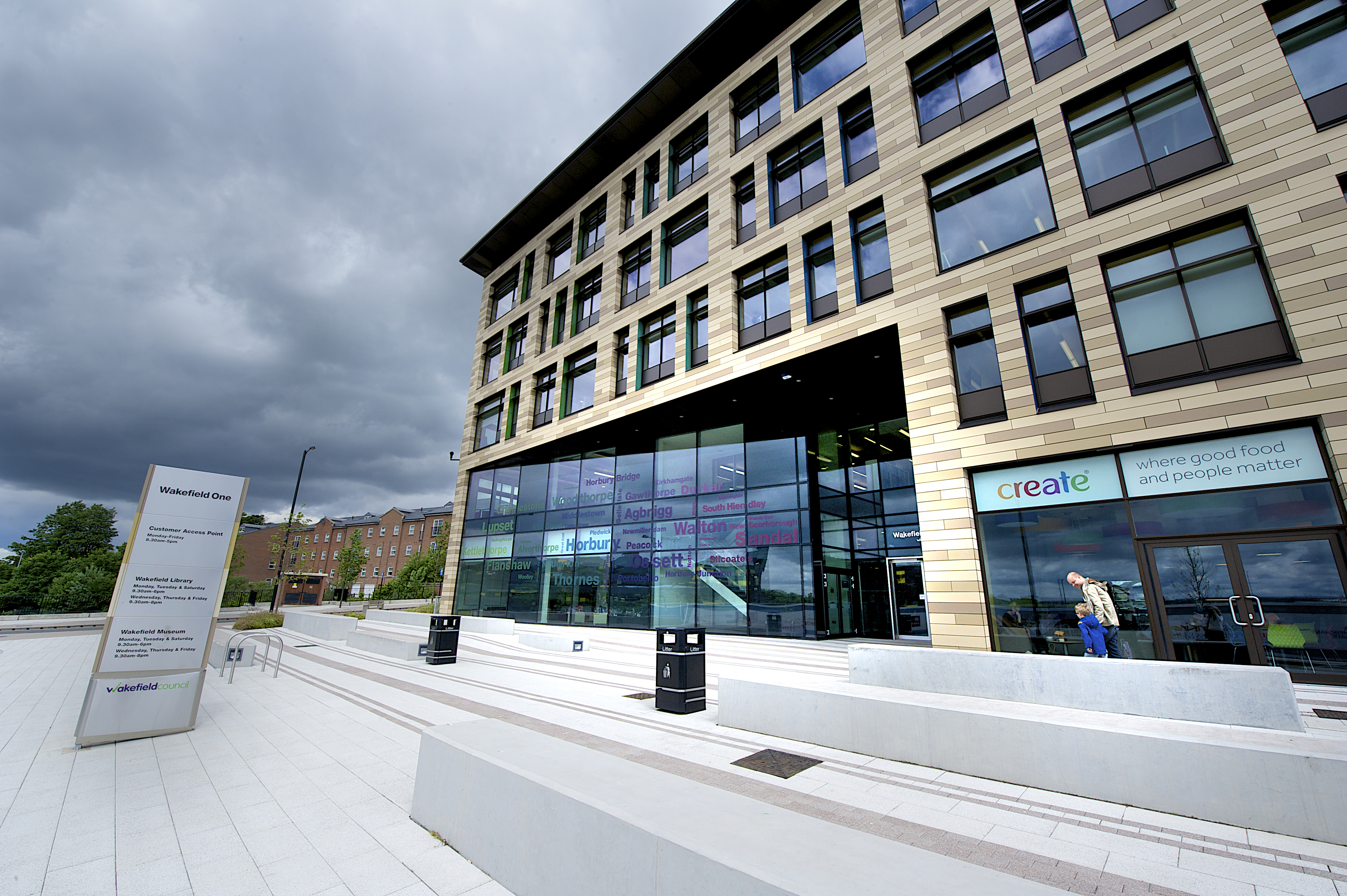
View of the Wakefield Museum

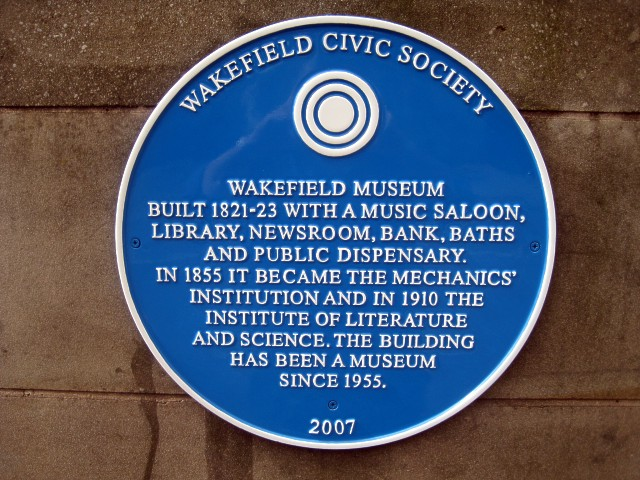
Blue plaque on the old museum from the Wakefield Civic Society.

Wakefield Museum is a local museum in Wakefield, West Yorkshire, north England, covering the history of the city of Wakefield and the local area from prehistoric times onwards.

== History ==
From 1955 Wakefield Museum was housed in the former Wakefield Mechanics' Institute, a 19th-century listed building. Wakefield Museum has been in its current home, the Wakefield One civic building, since 2013. The relocated museum was officially opened by Sir David Attenborough in March 2013.

== Overview ==
The museum covers the story of Wakefield, looking at the Manor of Wakefield in the Tudor period, HM Prison Wakefield, Wakefield as the West Yorkshire Police Headquarters, Wakefield Trinity Wildcats, The Battle of Wakefield, Wakefield's writers and theatres and more.

There is a dedicated area to Charles Waterton – a pioneering Victorian eco-warrior, explorer and Yorkshireman. Waterton developed a nature park (arguably the first in Europe) at his home, Walton Hall near Wakefield. His collection of preserved animals some made up from different animal parts can be seen. The caiman which Waterton rode ashore in South America is displayed under the floor, allowing visitors to get a unique view of this special object. The collection belongs to Stonyhurst College which has loaned the collection to the museum since 1967. The loan is planned to end at the end of 2022.

Other exhibits include an 1809 post box believed to be the oldest example in Britain, a pair of boots which belonged to Rugby league player, Don Fox, and a medieval posy ring from Sandal Castle.

== See also ==
- List of museums in West Yorkshire
