= Gordon Rintoul =

Director of National Museums Scotland

Gordon Rintoul CBE FRSE
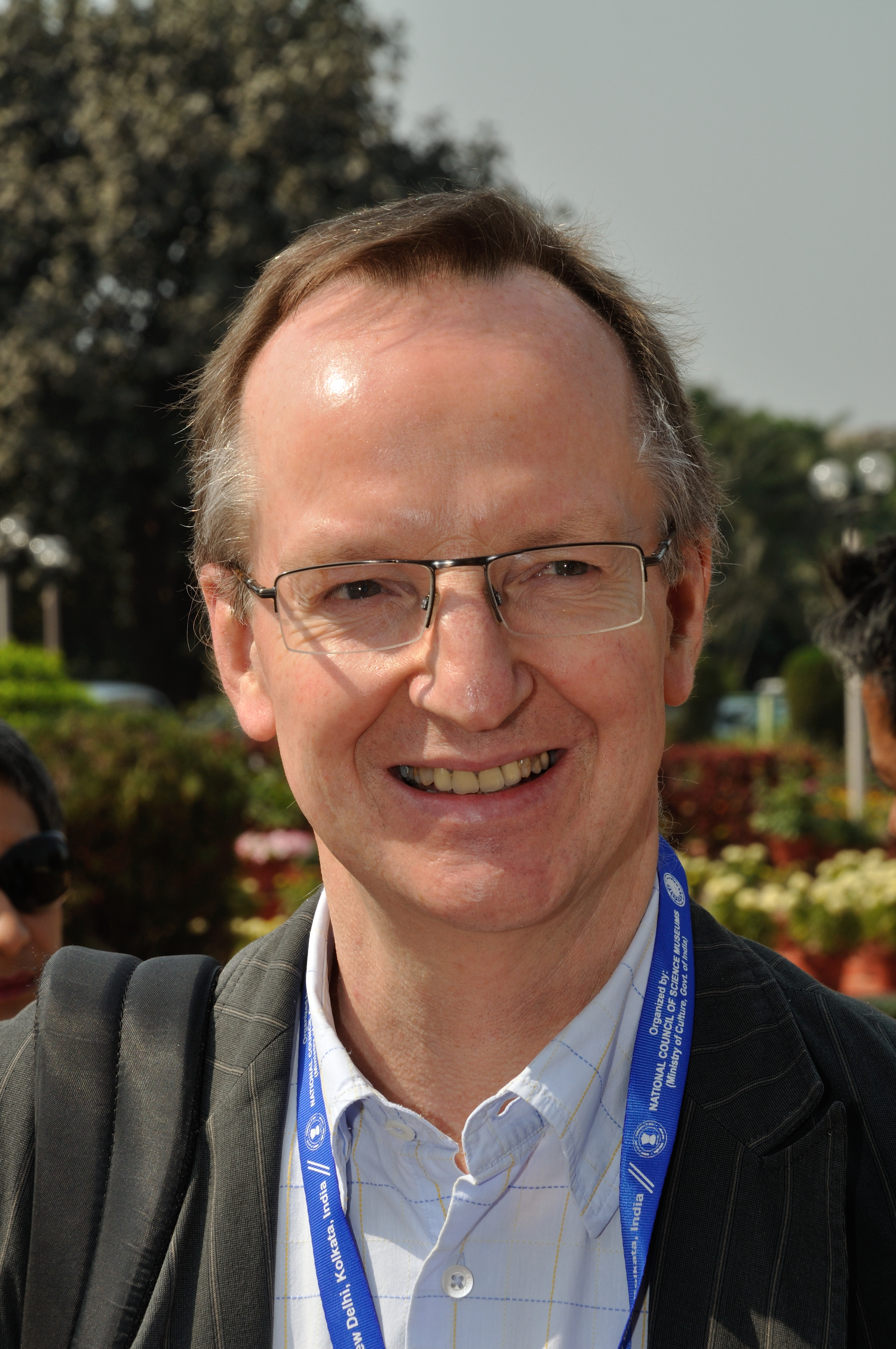
- Born: Glasgow
- Education: Allan Glen's School; University of Edinburgh (physics); University of Manchester (history, science and technology)

Gordon Rintoul (born 29 May 1955) CBE FRSE is the former Director of National Museums Scotland in Edinburgh, Scotland.

Rintoul was born in Glasgow, Scotland in 1955 and was educated at Allan Glen's School, a science-orientated school in the city. He studied physics at the University of Edinburgh and received a PhD from the University of Manchester in the history of science and technology. In 1984, he was appointed as curator of the Colour Museum in Bradford, West Yorkshire. Between 1987 and 1998, he was Director of Catalyst, a museum in Widnes, Cheshire on the chemical industry. In 1989, he was awarded the Diploma of the Museums Association.

In 1998, he became Chief Executive of the Sheffield Galleries and Museums Trust.

In 2001, he led the opening of the Millennium Galleries, an art gallery in Sheffield, South Yorkshire, with funding from the Millennium Commission and in partnership with the Victoria and Albert Museum. He became Director of National Museums Scotland in 2002, where he has led the project to restore the Royal Museum.

== Honours and awards ==
Rintoul was appointed Commander of the Order of the British Empire (CBE) in the 2012 Birthday Honours for services to the museum sector. He won the top award from the Glenfiddich Spirit of Scotland Awards in 2014. In 2018 he was elected a Fellow of the Royal Society of Edinburgh.
