= Ilkley Manor House =

Heritage museum in West Yorkshire, England

Coordinates: 53°55′38″N 1°49′29″W

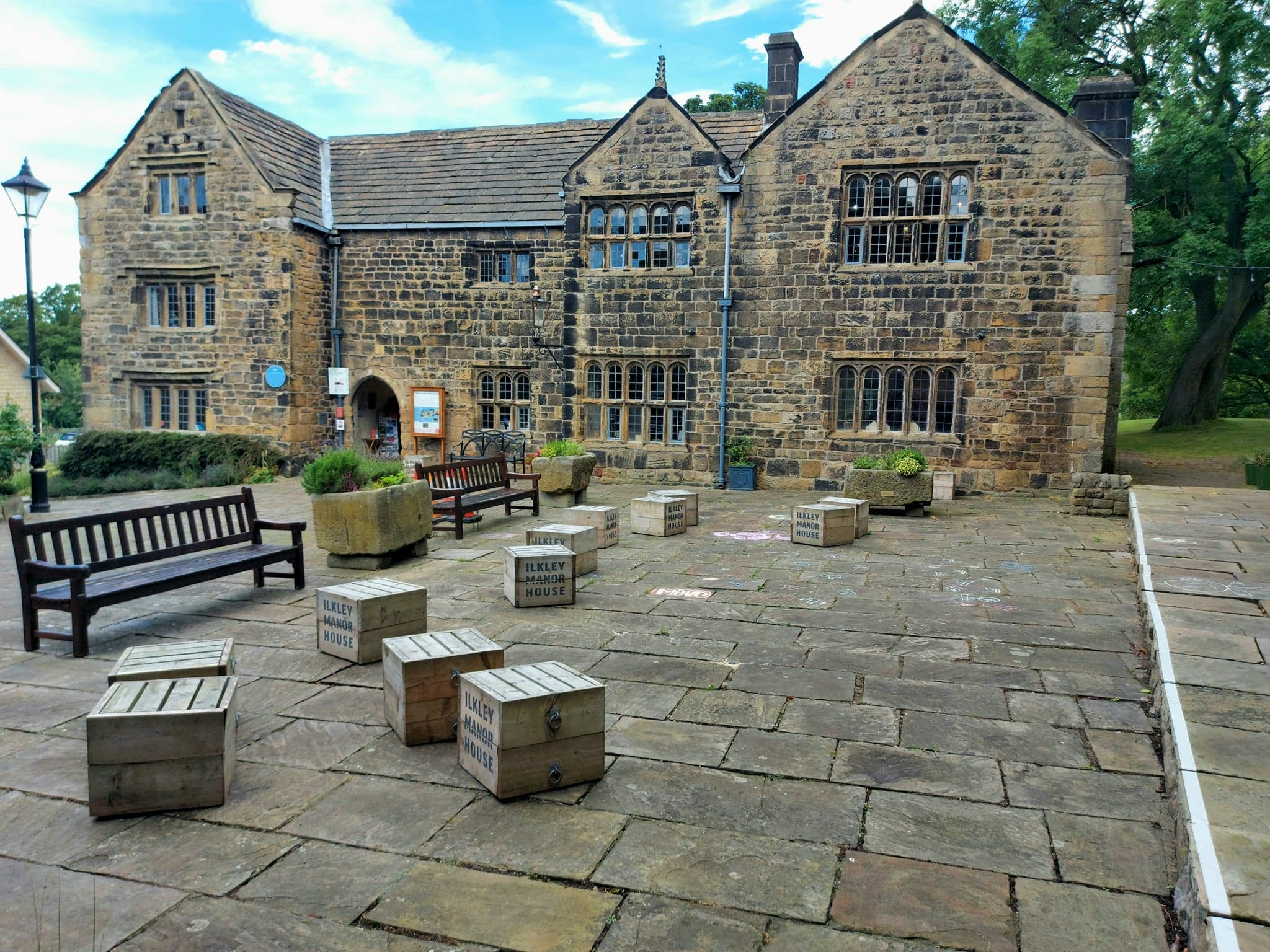
- The front or south-facing side of Ilkley Manor House, Ilkley, with a view of the Castle Yard courtyard.
- Former name: Manor House Museum and Art Gallery
- Established: 1961
- Location: Castle Yard, Ilkley, West Yorkshire, England LS29 9DT
- Type: Heritage centre, Historic house museum, Interpretation centre, Art gallery
- Public transit access: Ilkley railway station; Ben Rhydding railway station
- Website: www.ilkleymanorhouse.org

Ilkley Manor House, Ilkley, West Yorkshire, England, is a local heritage museum, art gallery, and live venue, and was established in the present building in 1961 to preserve local archaeological artefacts after the spa town expanded and much Roman material was lost. It was managed by Bradford Council Museums and Galleries department but had to be closed in 2013 owing to lack of funds. In order to keep the building open to the public, the Ilkley Manor House Trust was formed, and in April 2018, Bradford Council transferred the Manor House and three adjacent cottages to the Trust as a community asset transfer.

== History of the Ilkley Museum ==
The following are key events in the history of the Ilkley Museum before the artefacts were moved to Ilkley Manor House:

- 1892: A museum was established by the Museum Committee, whose president was Dr G. Carter, under the auspices of the Ilkley Ratepayers' Association. This had become urgent when the expansion of the spa town of Ilkley caused disturbance of Roman and other remains under the town. It was said that Roman material was being carried away by the cartload, and local antiquarians had been attempting to rescue and preserve some of these artefacts but they had nowhere to display them. The present manor house building, known then as the Old Castle, was the committee's first choice but it was too expensive and so they bought the Old Wesleyan Chapel which had been built in 1834. The opening ceremony was on Thursday 25 August 1892. The Rev. Dr Collyer, who gave the opening speech, asked his audience to guard both the rescued artefacts and the archaeological remains that were still buried under Ilkley. The first curator was Herbert Oxley, who was paid £1 per week. On 14 September it was renamed the Ilkley Museum and Antiquarian Society.
- 1893: The earliest exhibits were: local geological and botanical specimens; drawings of local stones with Neolithic or early Bronze Age cup and ring engravings; local Roman relics including a triple vase; relics of a local character, James Fletcher the fiddler, known as Blind Jim. The Museum had his portrait and 18th century chair.
- 1896: Ilkley Urban District Council took over the museum. Oxley, the curator, died and was replaced by his wife.
- 1908: The museum was moved to the upper floor of the new Public Library, which had been opened in 1907. William Graham took over as curator; he held the post until 1942.
- 1922-28: Donations had expanded the collection, but the museum could not afford to move to larger premises. An unmanageably large collection of non-local objects interfered with classification, labelling, and display of its local core items: the Roman artefacts. Furthermore, the Ilkley Gazette had received a letter of complaint that the museum was more like a curiosity shop and therefore the collection had to be reduced. Many non-local items were returned to owners or sold to Keighley Museum, which was based in Victoria Hall on Hard Ings Road at that time, such as the Ellison collection of classified geological specimens. Other items held at the museum include: photographs of notable local people; a stuffed albatross; valuable coins; a Queen Victoria mug; Japanese armour; Anglo-Saxon cross carvings; a "famous Roman triple vase [...] found near the Assembly Hall in Weston Road"; a serpent (musical instrument); boomerangs; a sawfish. Arthur M. Woodward, the classifier of the Roman artefacts, was absent in Greece when this article was written, so there may have been intimations of an administrative power struggle involved in the publication of this piece in the Gazette.
- 1939–1948: The museum exhibits were packed away to make room for wartime administration. The curator, William Graham, died and was not replaced. Items in storage became muddled together or went missing.
- 1949: The museum was re-established, with Grace Simpson restoring order and Elsie Fletcher becoming Honorary Curator. It was reopened on 4 June 1949 as Ilkley Museum.
- 1954: Elsie Fletcher started the Olicana Museum Society, which later became the Olicana Historical Society. This society, which still exists today, focuses on archaeological and historical heritage and organises talks and excursions.
- 1955–1961: The Old Castle — Ilkley Manor House's current building - became available to the Museum but was facing demolition and required cash and conversion from cottages into one building. Costs were quoted at £7,000-£10,000, but there were contributions from Ilkley Urban District Council and Percy Dalton, and a grant from the Ministry of Works. The Manor House Museum and Art Gallery was opened on 8 July 1961.

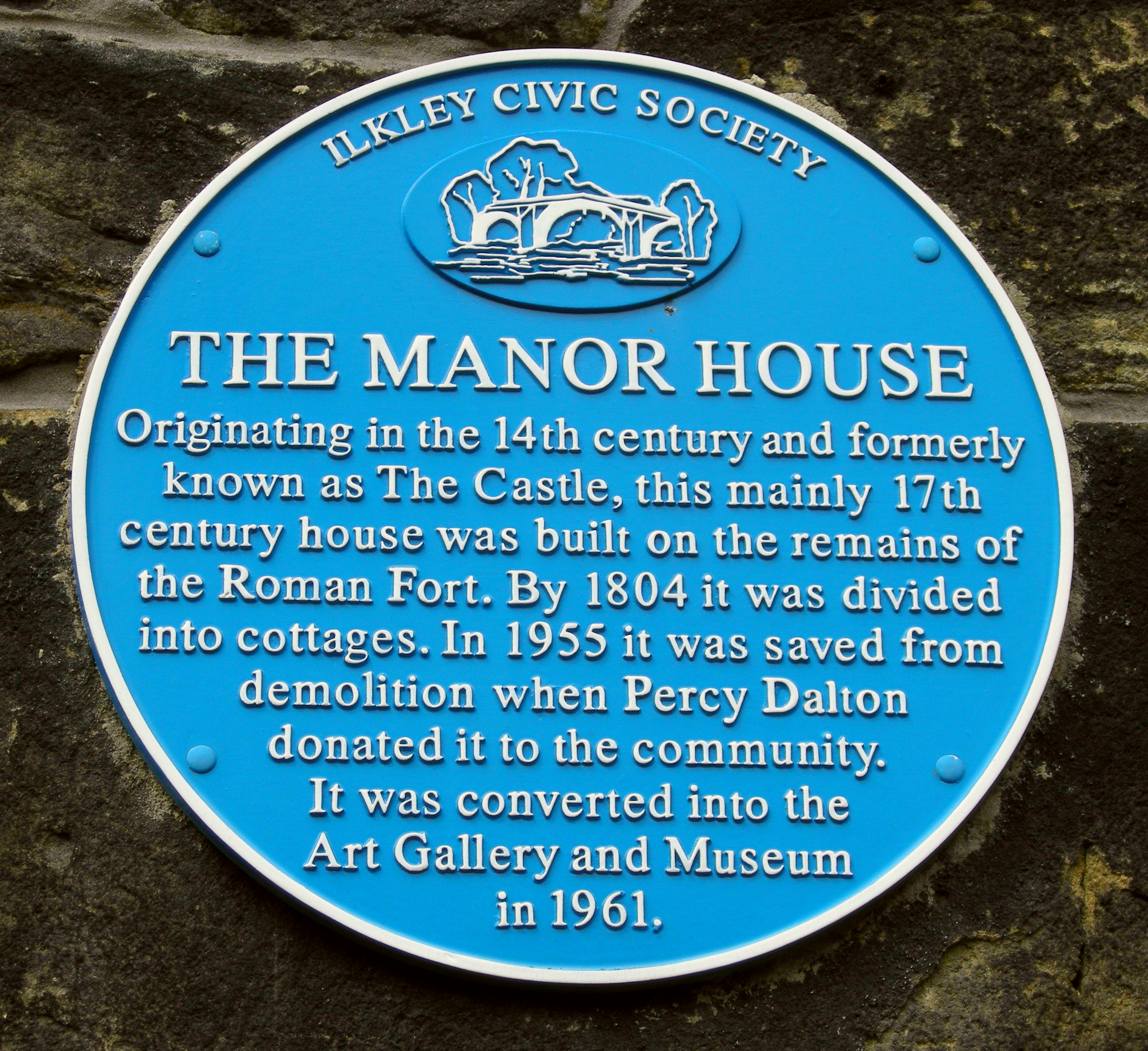
The Museum's blue plaque

== Ilkley Manor House from 1961 ==
The following list details key events in Ilkley Manor House's history since it was converted into a museum and art gallery in 1961:

- 1961–1974: The restored Old Castle building itself became the main exhibit of the Museum. By 1963, both upper rooms were art galleries and Arthur Kitching, the second curator of the Manor House Museum, started in his role. He himself was a respected artist and exhibited his work at the House.
- 1963: The Friends of the Manor House was formed.
- 1974-77: The caretakers had lived upstairs in the west wing of the Manor House but their rooms were turned into offices. Also in 1974, the Arts and Museums Division of the Bradford Metropolitan District was formed and so the Manor House was able to get some of its lost exhibits back, and benefited from communal museum resources. In 1977, Arthur Kitching stepped down as curator.
- 2013: Bradford Metropolitan District Council announced that due to lack of funds, Ilkley Manor House would receive no more funding. A group was set up to campaign for funding and halt the closure of the House.
- 2016: Ilkley Manor House Trust is formed.
- 2017: Bradford Council allows the Manor House to be transferred to the Trust and run as a community asset.
- 2018: After being closed for five years, Ilkley Manor House is reopened by its patron, Alan Titchmarsh.
- 2021: The Friends of the Manor House is disbanded.
- 2022-present: In early 2022, the Manor House launched the Supporters' Scheme and the two Verbeia altar stones (the Roman original and the 1608 replica) were moved to be placed together in the Heritage Room.

== Current exhibits ==
The majority of the local historical artefacts are now housed in the Heritage Room which is on the ground floor of the solar wing. There are items dated from the Neolithic period, to Roman, to Medieval, as well as Victorian, Edwardian, and more recent years.

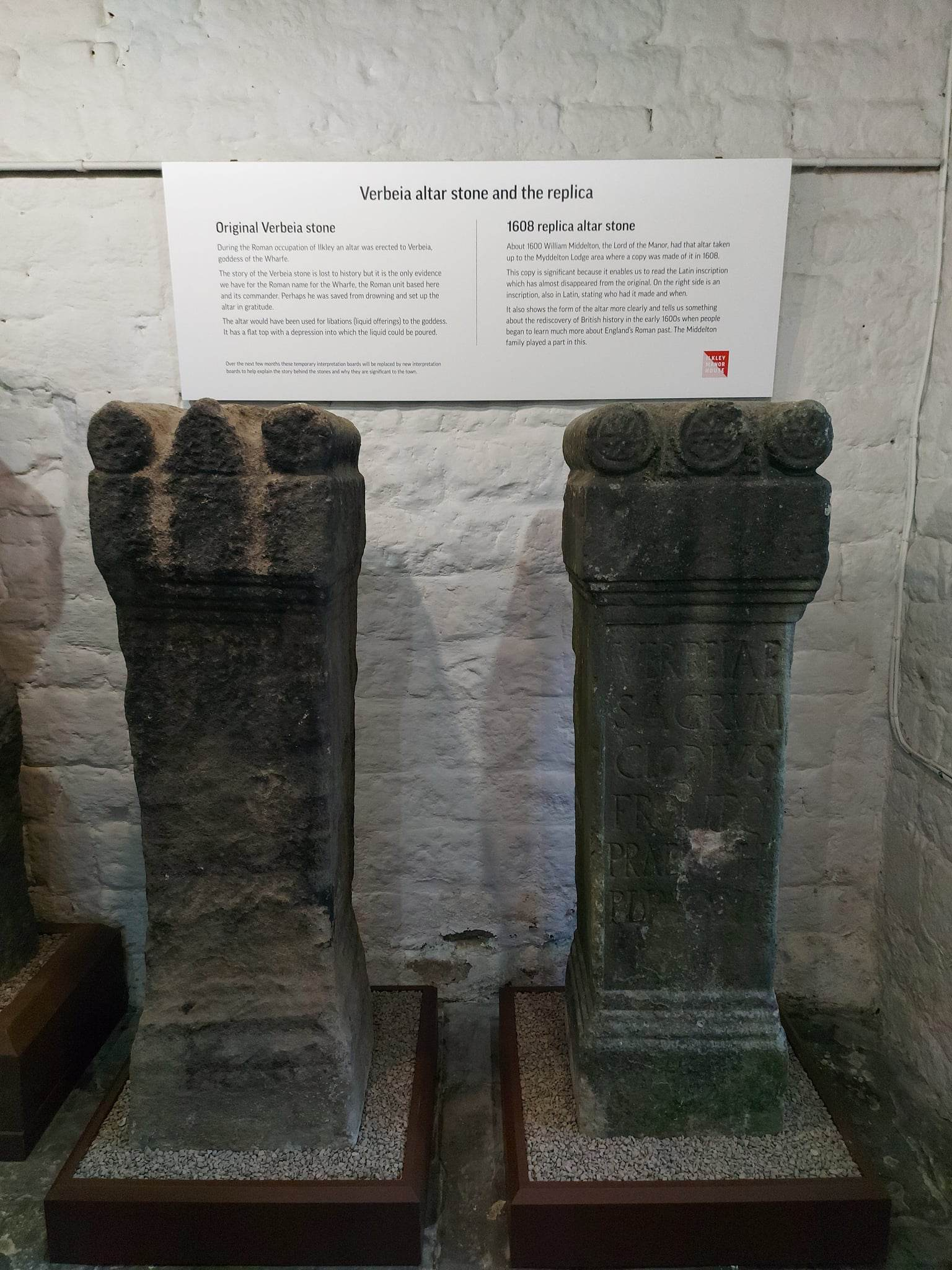
The original Roman altar on the left and the 1608 replica on the right. The original is dedicated to the goddess of the River Wharfe, Verbeia.

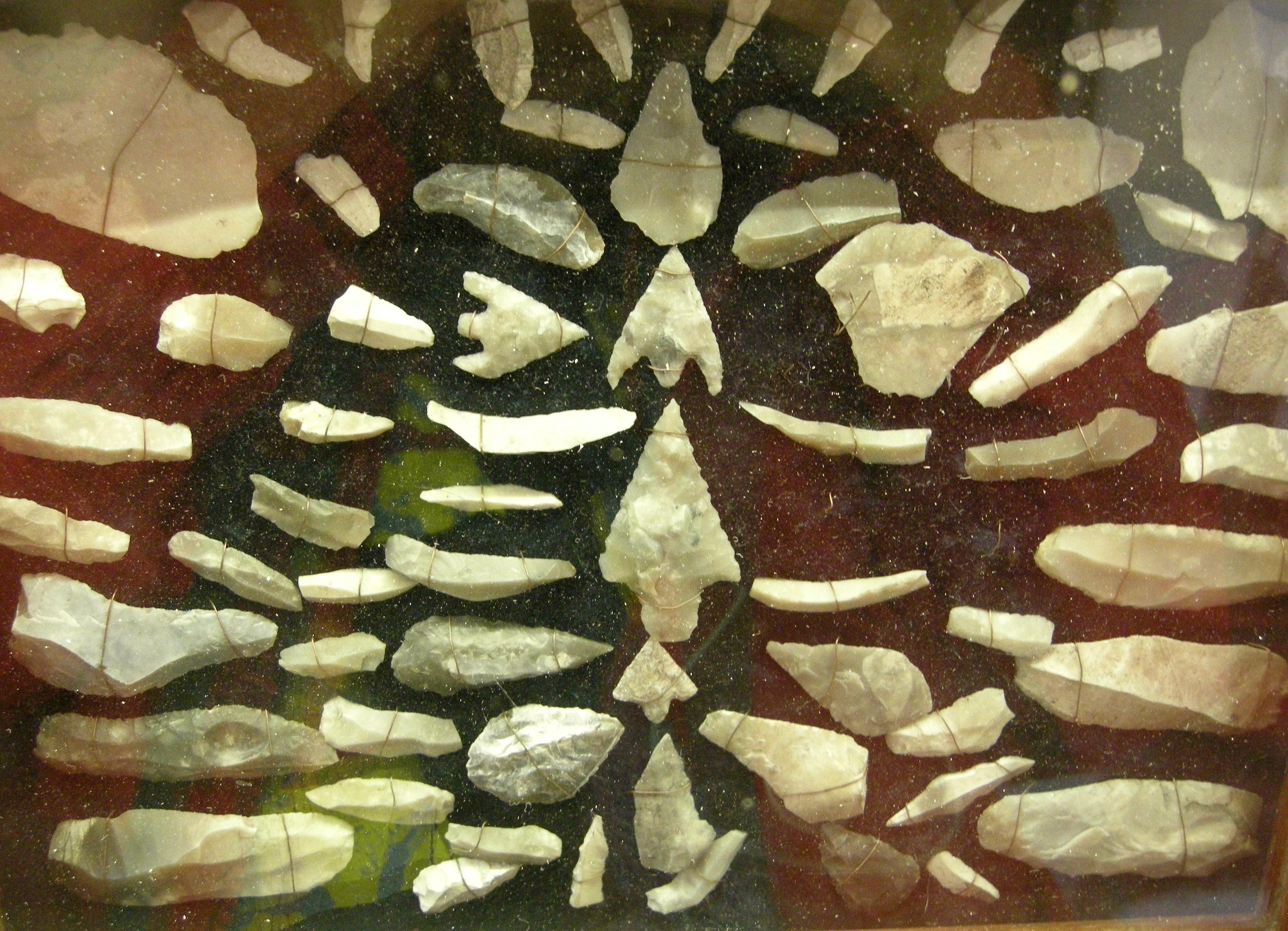
Neolithic arrowheads

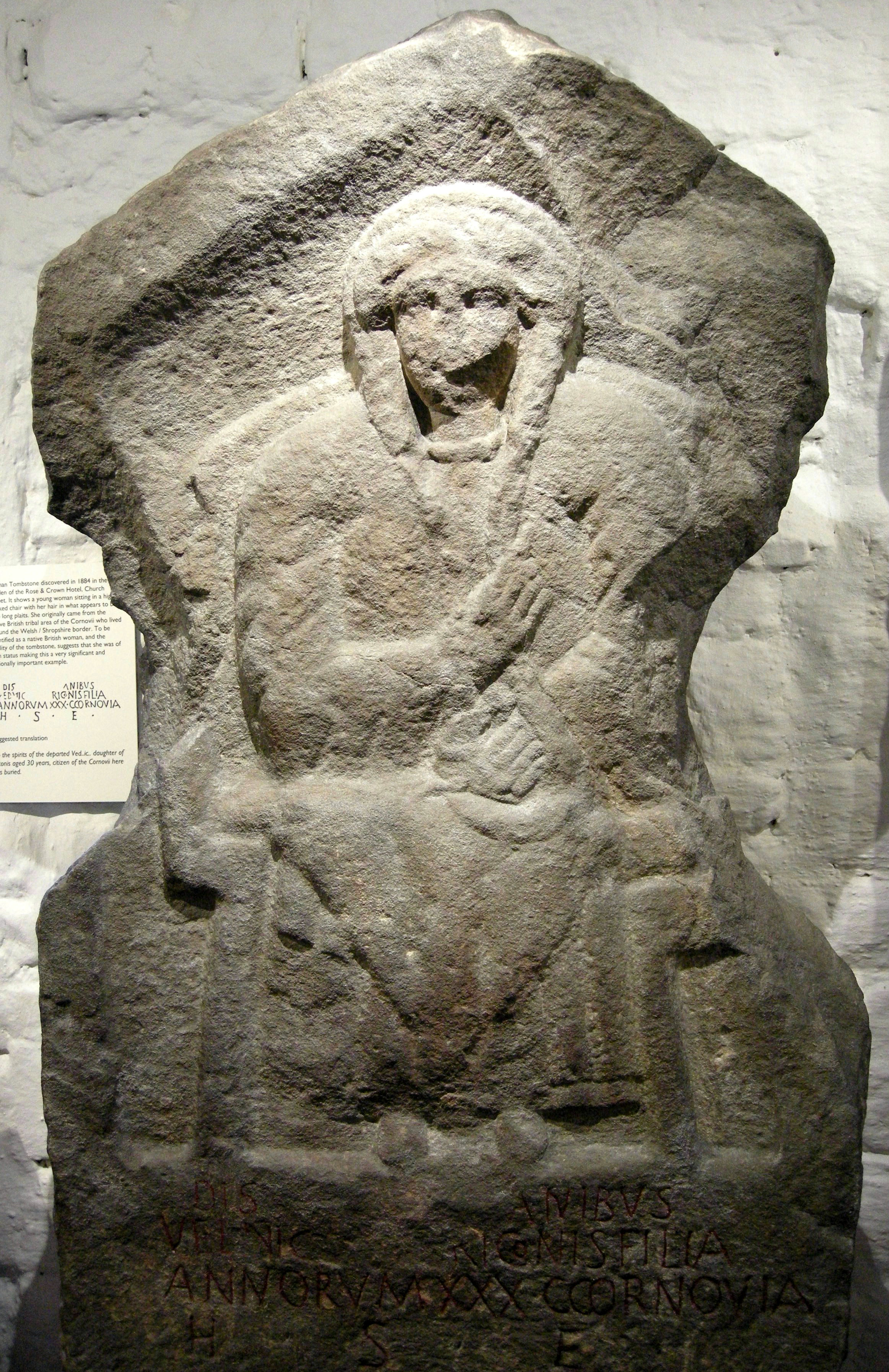
Gritstone bas-relief tombstone of Romano-British woman Vedica, who died aged 30.

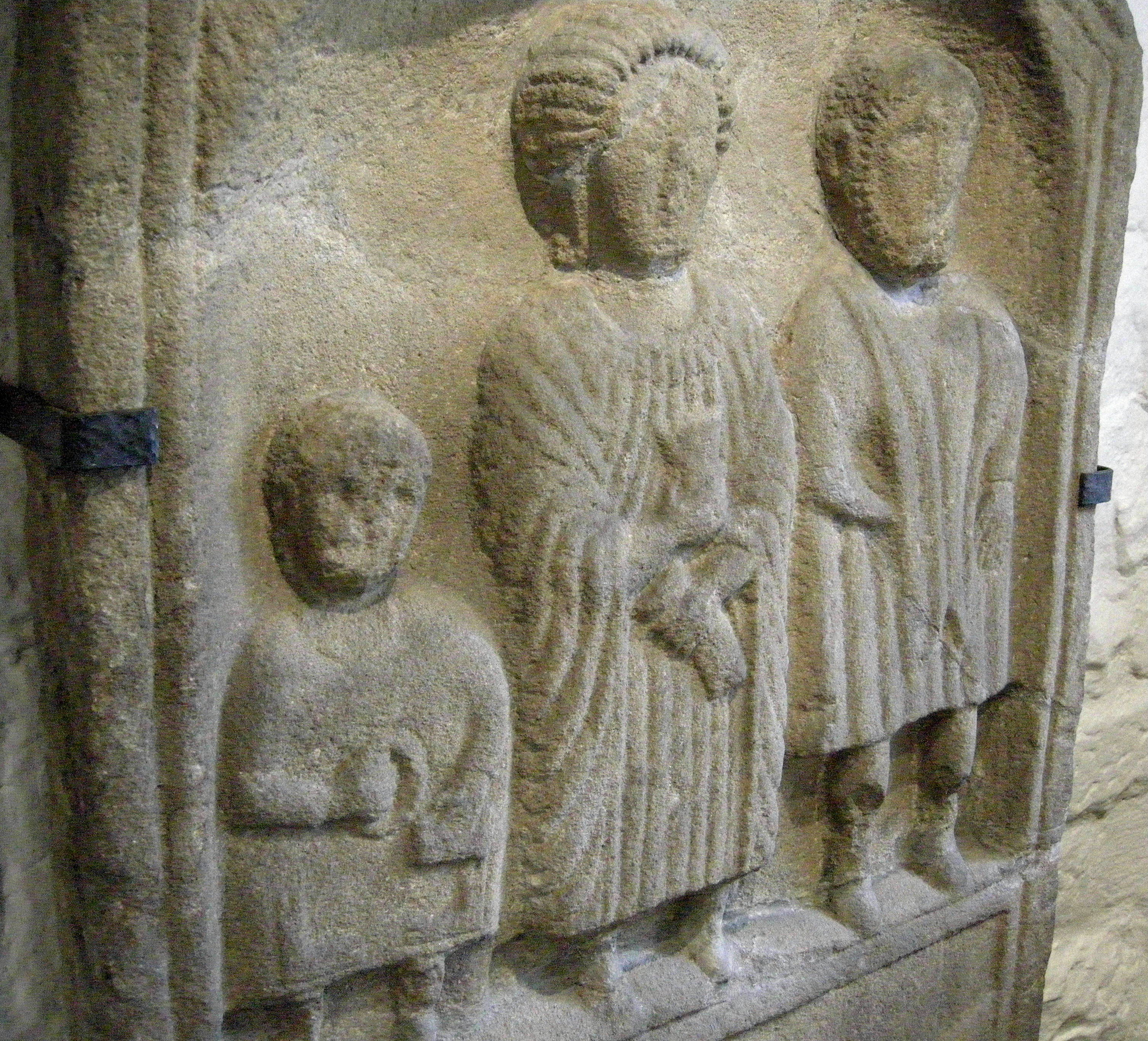
Sandstone bas-relief of Roman family.

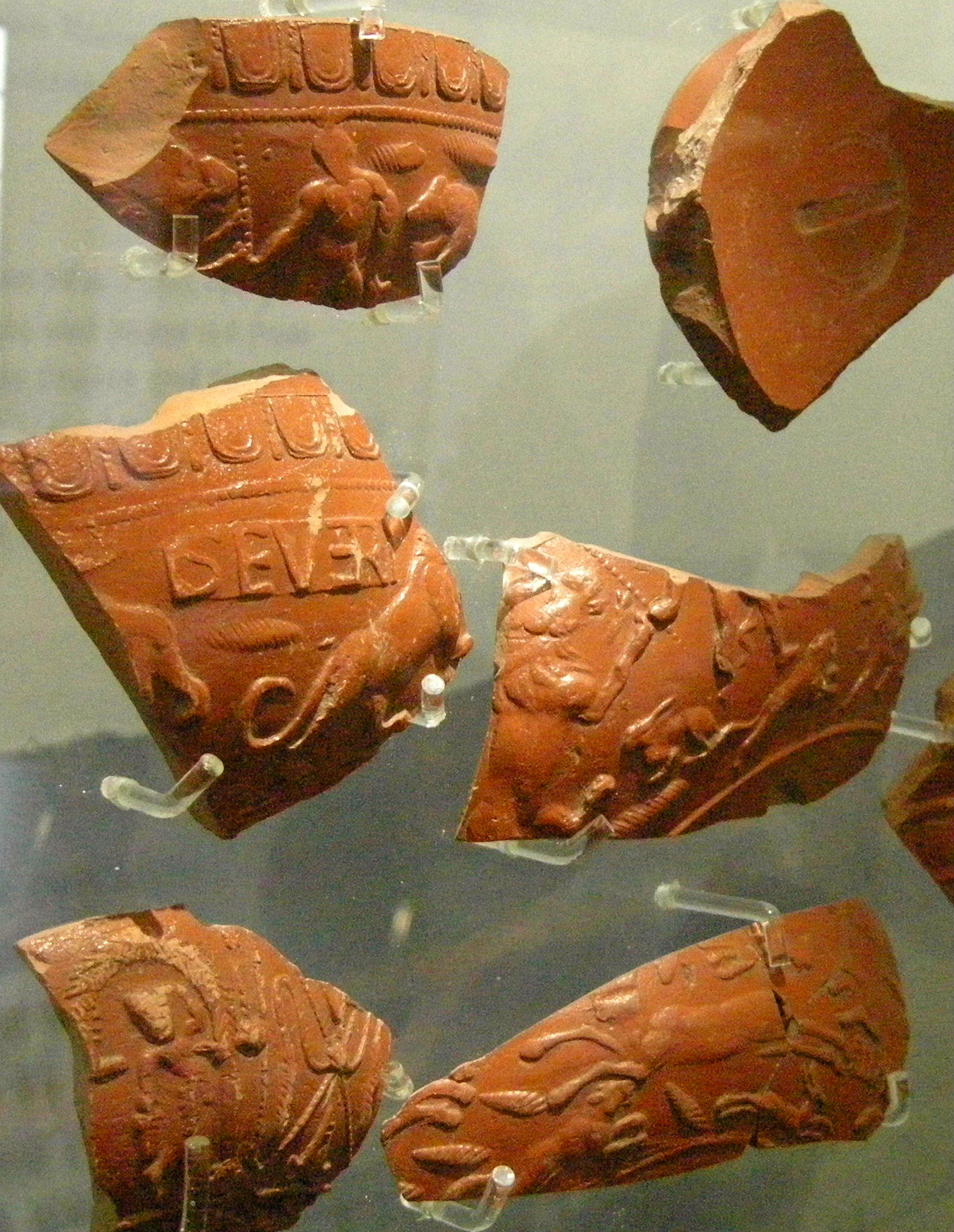
Samian ware sherds.

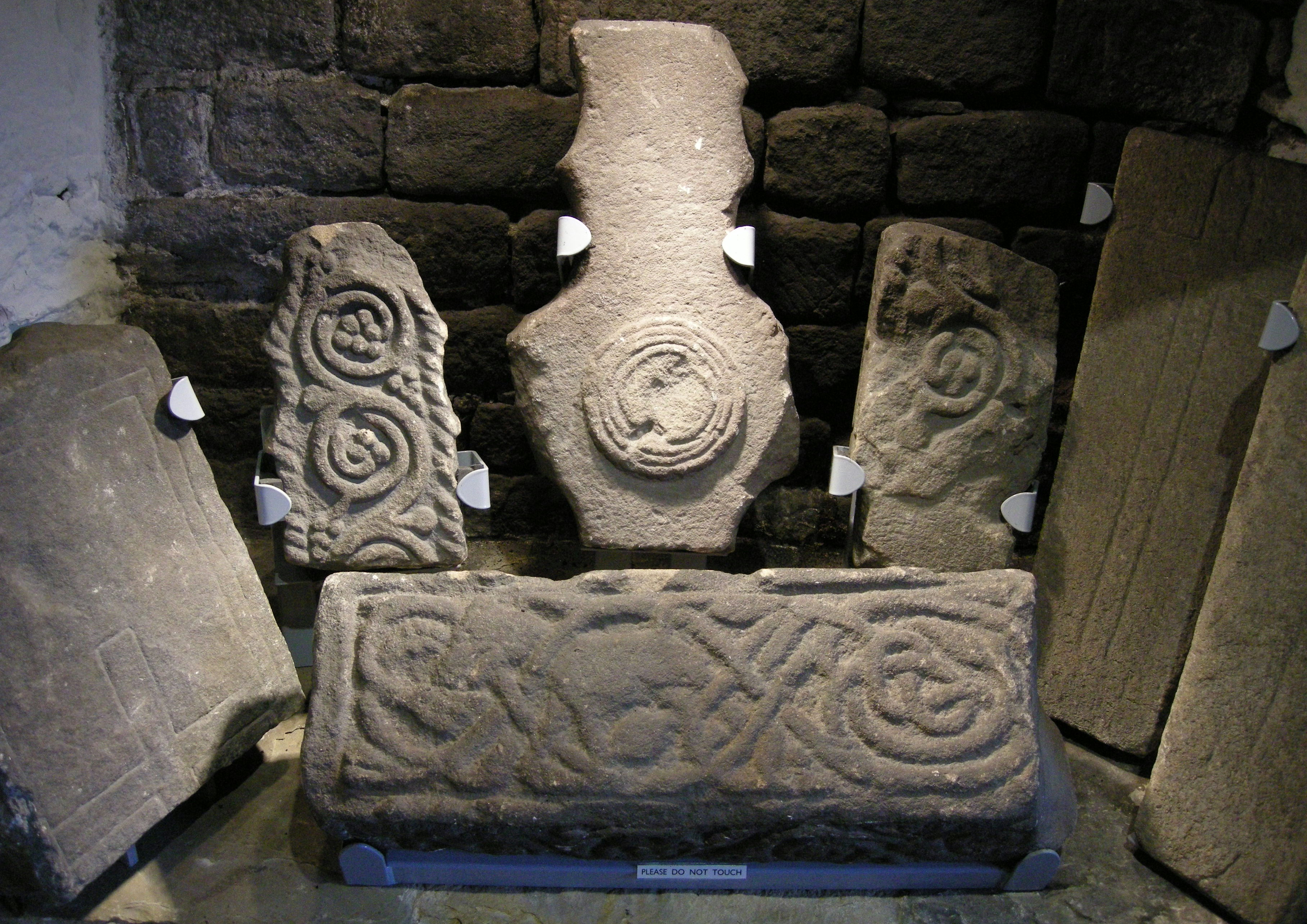
Anglo-Saxon carved sandstone blocks.

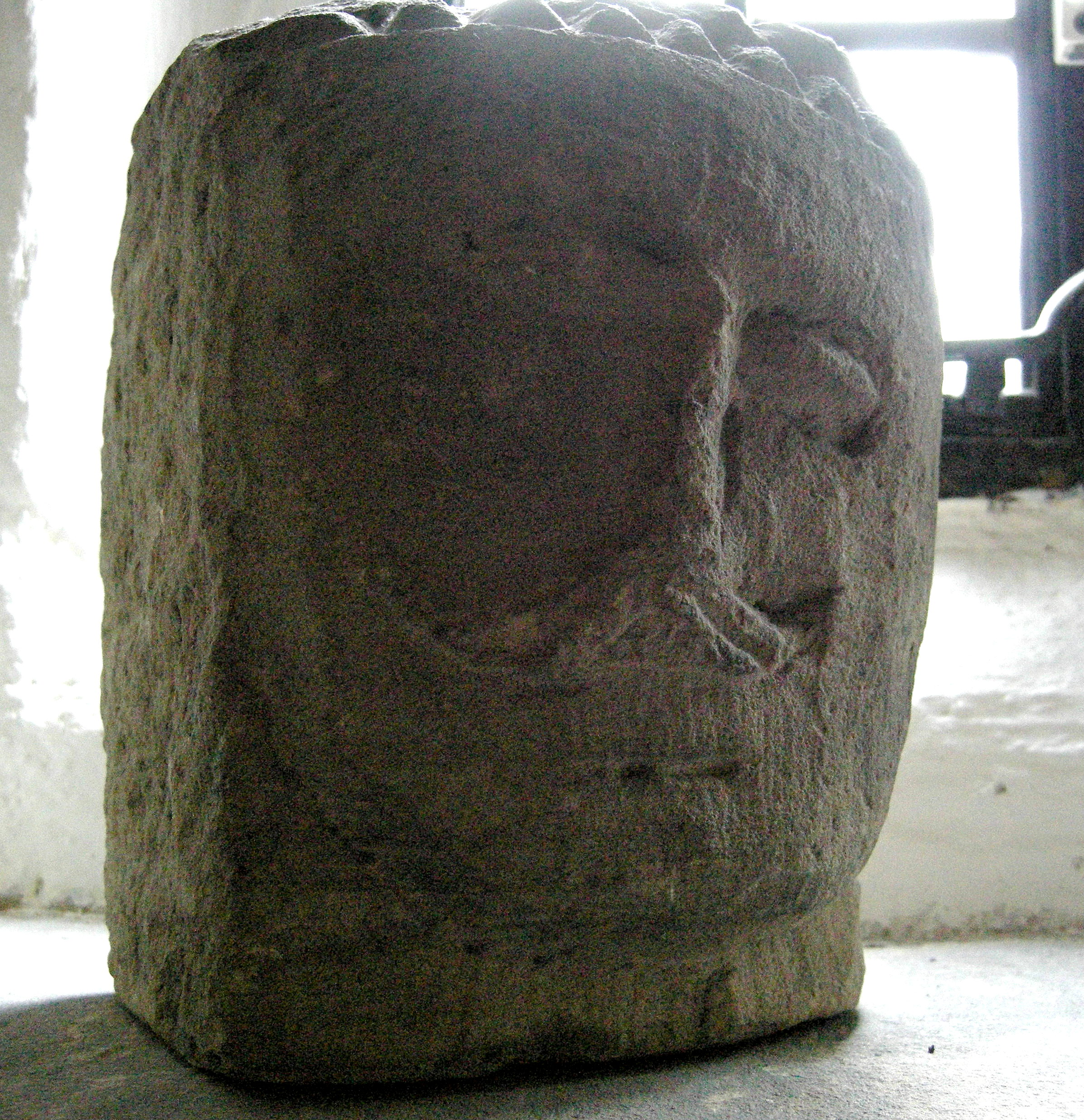
Carved sandstone head; possibly Saxon or Iron Age.

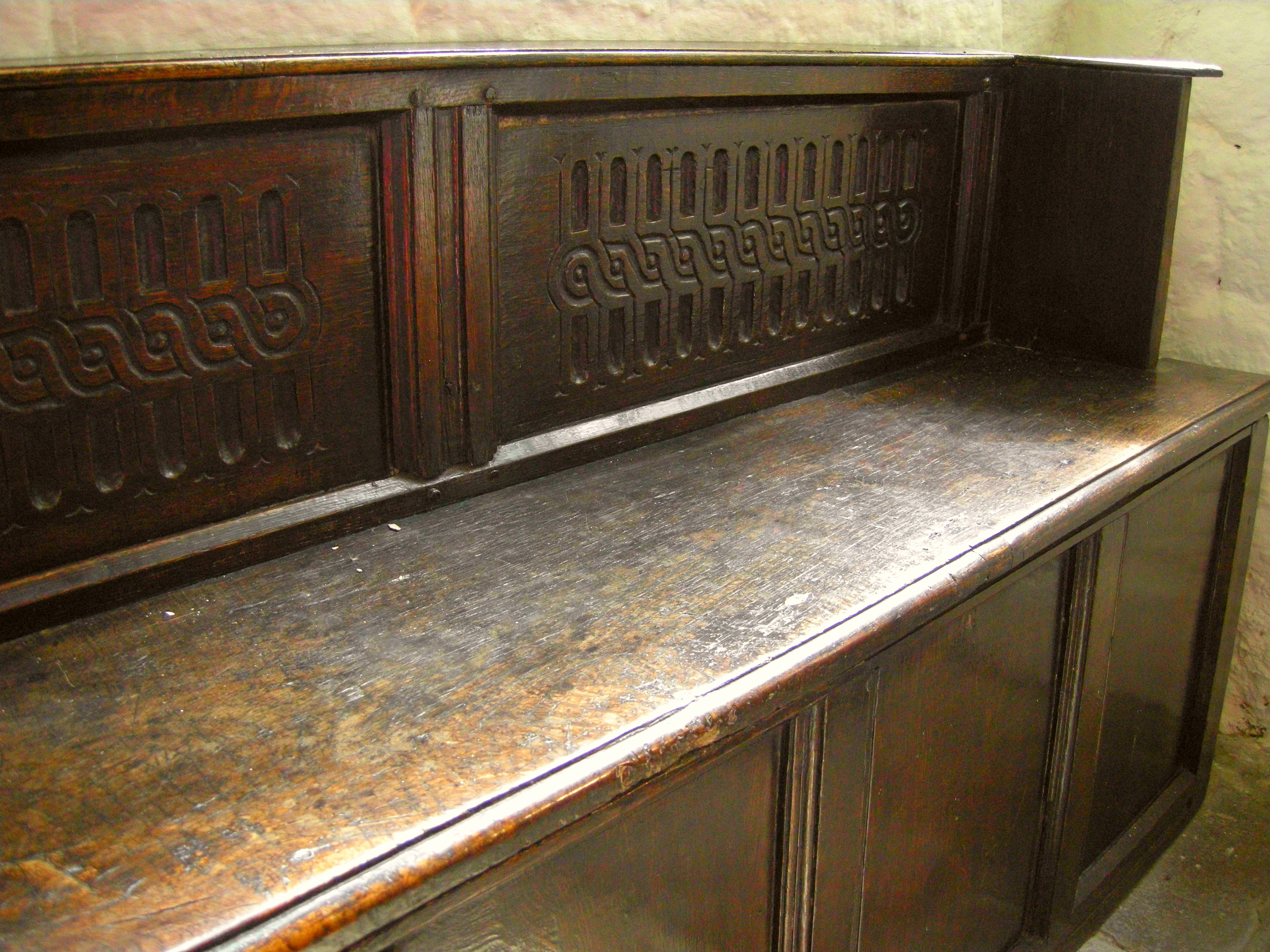
Oak bench from home of Thomas Chippendale, possibly made by him or his father.

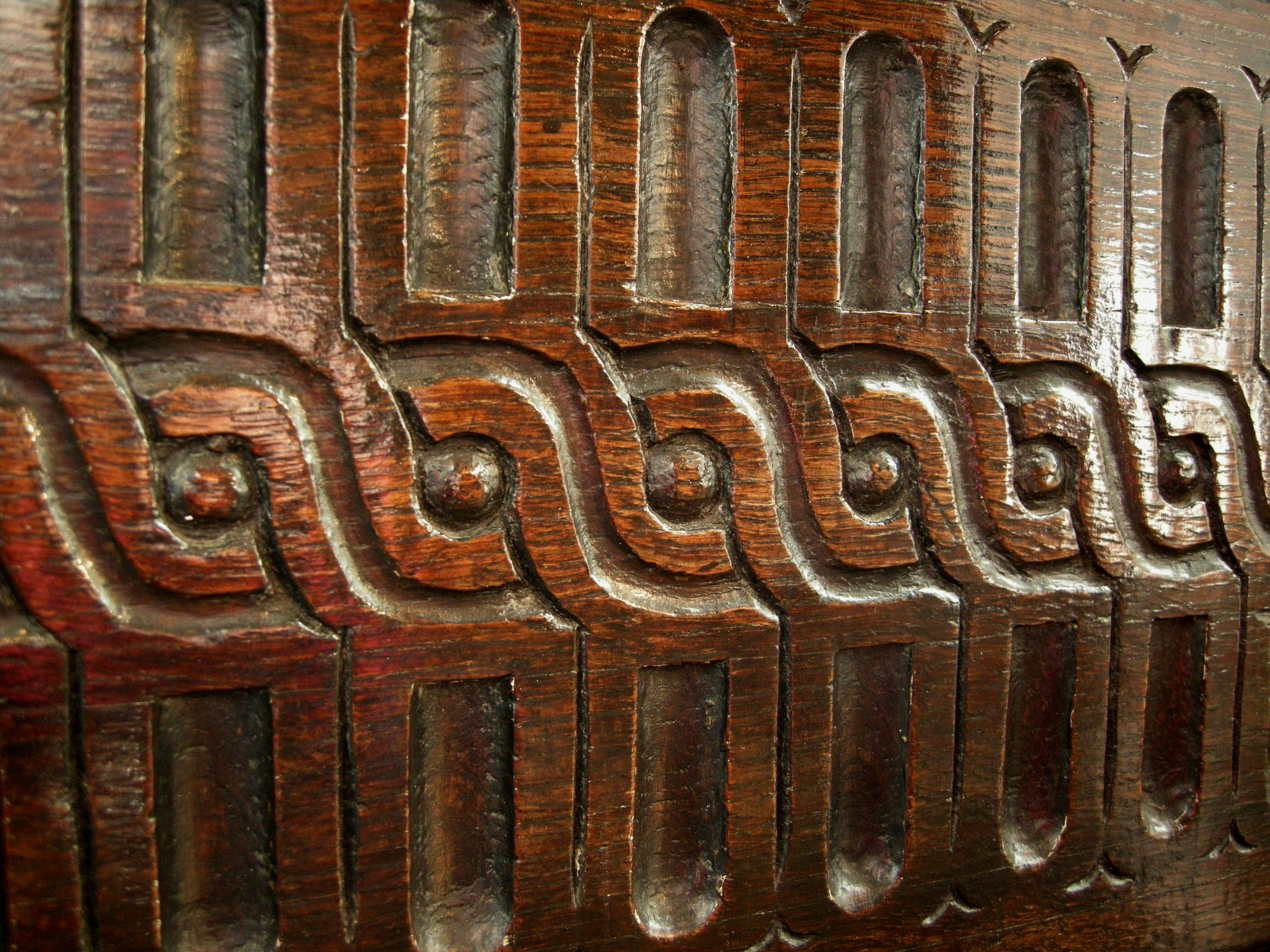
Oak bench from home of Thomas Chippendale, possibly made by him or his father: closeup.

== The Manor House (Old Castle) building ==
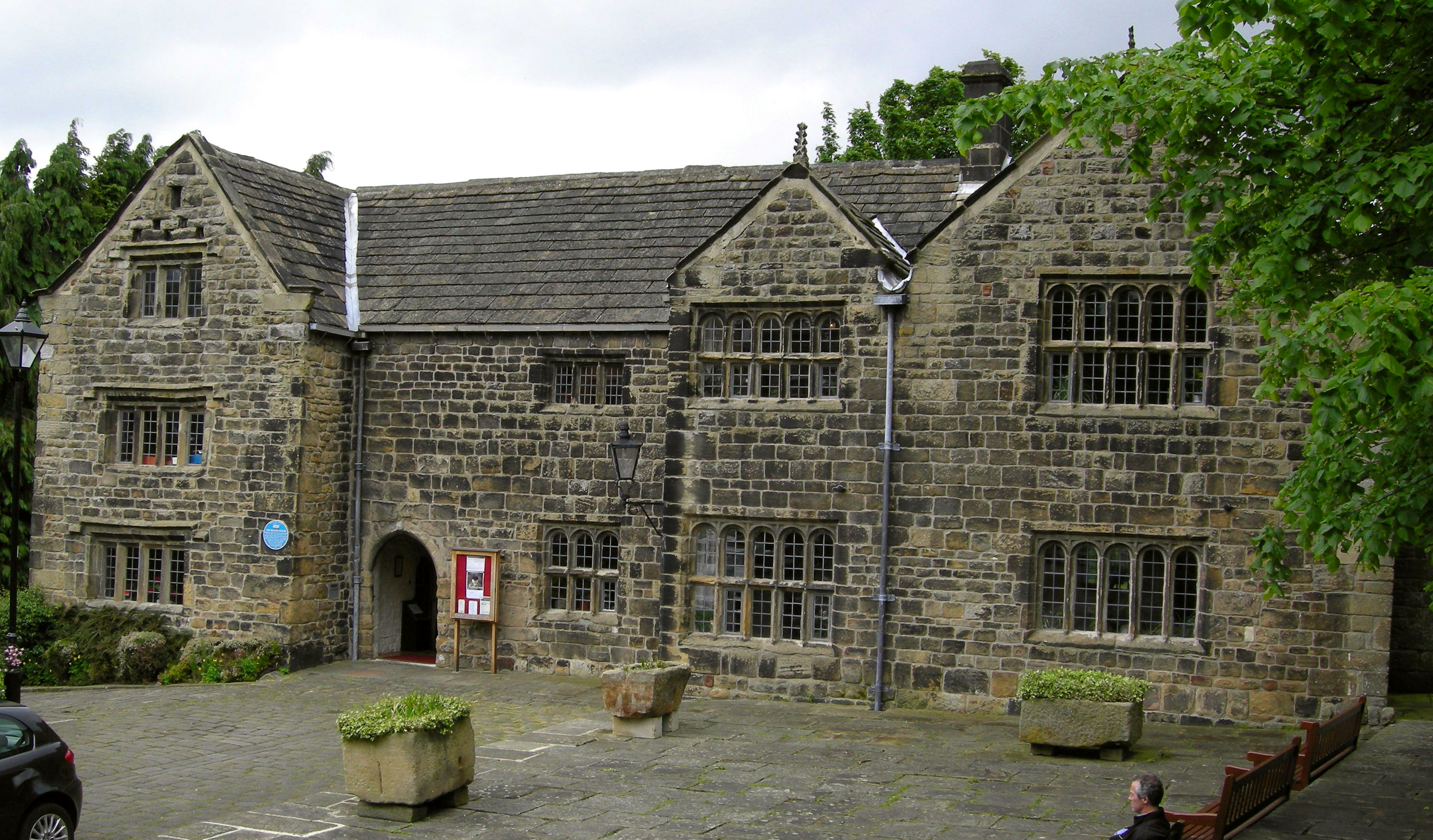
Ilkley Manor House, Ilkley. Front, or south elevation.

The Manor House building is of historic interest. This is the oldest dwelling-house in Ilkley and was built along with All Saints' Parish Church on the site of the Roman fort, Olicana. The church was built in Anglo-Saxon times on top of the Principia or headquarters building of the fort. The Manor House was built into the west defences: that is, it was incorporated with part of the free-standing defensive west wall of the fort, and many robbed-out Roman small squared stone blocks are now part of the building.

Before it became the museum, Ilkley Manor House was known as 'The Castle'. The origin of this name was probably due to the Roman fort, i.e. castrum, from which we get the diminutive form 'castellum'. The House has evidence of a Pele Tower which may also explain why it was historically known as 'The Castle'. This is unlikely, however, because there is no evidence that the building itself was used for fortification.

The front of the building faces south. The left or west wing, which now contains the buttery and storeroom, is partly medieval and was built on the Roman fort wall. The interior entrances to the buttery and storeroom have 14th-century shouldered corbelled arches, or 'Caernarfon lintels'. The mullioned windows are 17th century. The central gable covers the main eating hall with fireplace, and the right or east gable is the solar wing, which contained upstairs accommodation for the owner, with a garderobe and fireplace. The upper floor of the solar wing is now home to the Solar Art Gallery. The front walls and windows of the central hall and solar wing are 16th century. The front doorway with pointed arch is possibly late Norman.

The back or north elevation of the building is partly built with stones robbed from the Roman fort. The passage doorway may be medieval, but the archway and right (west) wing are 17th-century. The wall beneath the central and east gables on this side is 15th- to 16th-century. The lowest large window in the solar wing on this north side is 17th-century; other north-elevation windows are more modern.

In the interior roof of the solar room, the rigid 15th- or 16th-century structure of king posts, tie beams and principal rafters forms the main frame of the roof, as a series of triangular trusses.

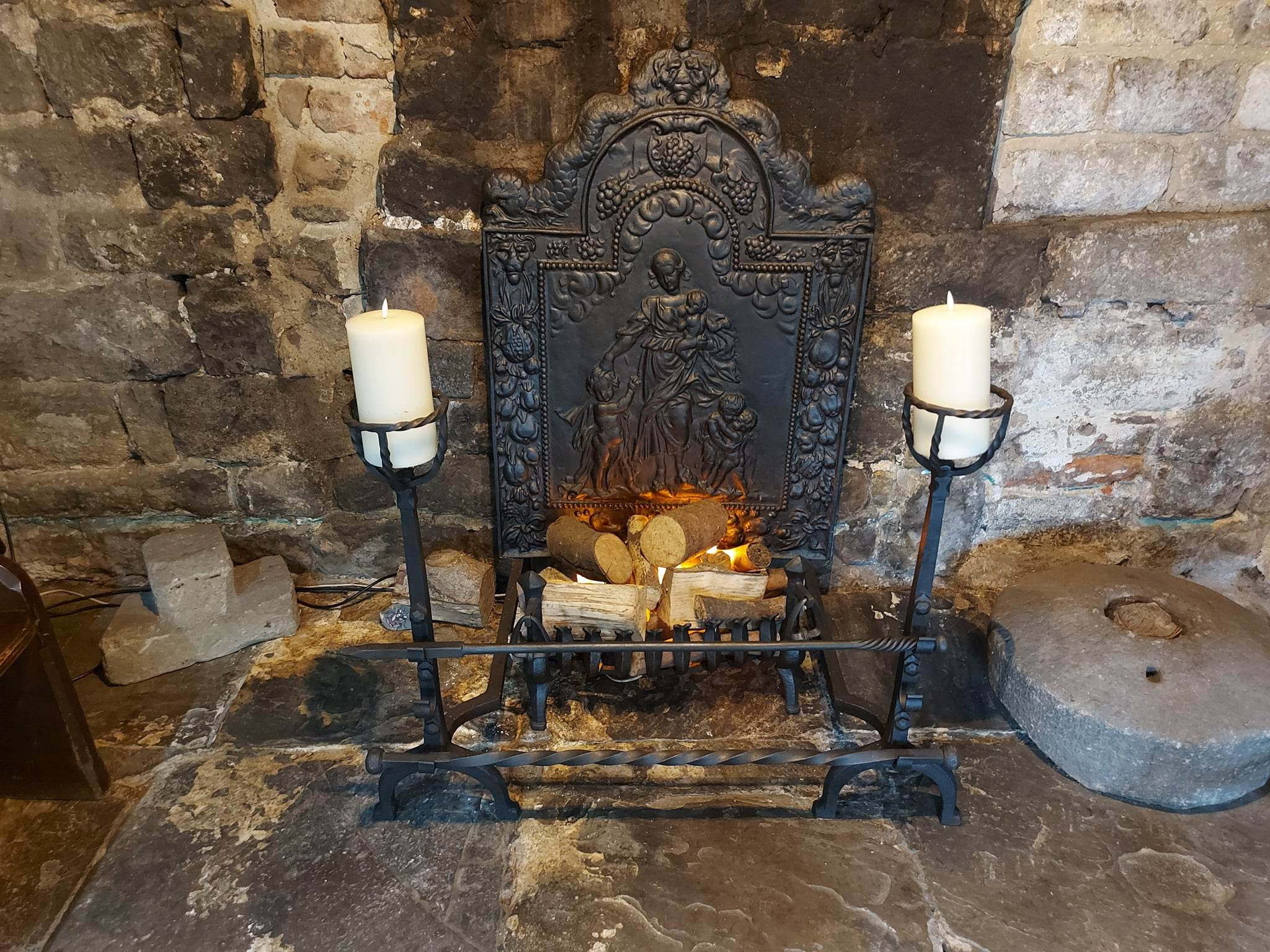
A close-up view of Ilkley Manor House's fireplace in the main hall. On the top right, you can just about see a rectangle where there was possibly a bread oven.

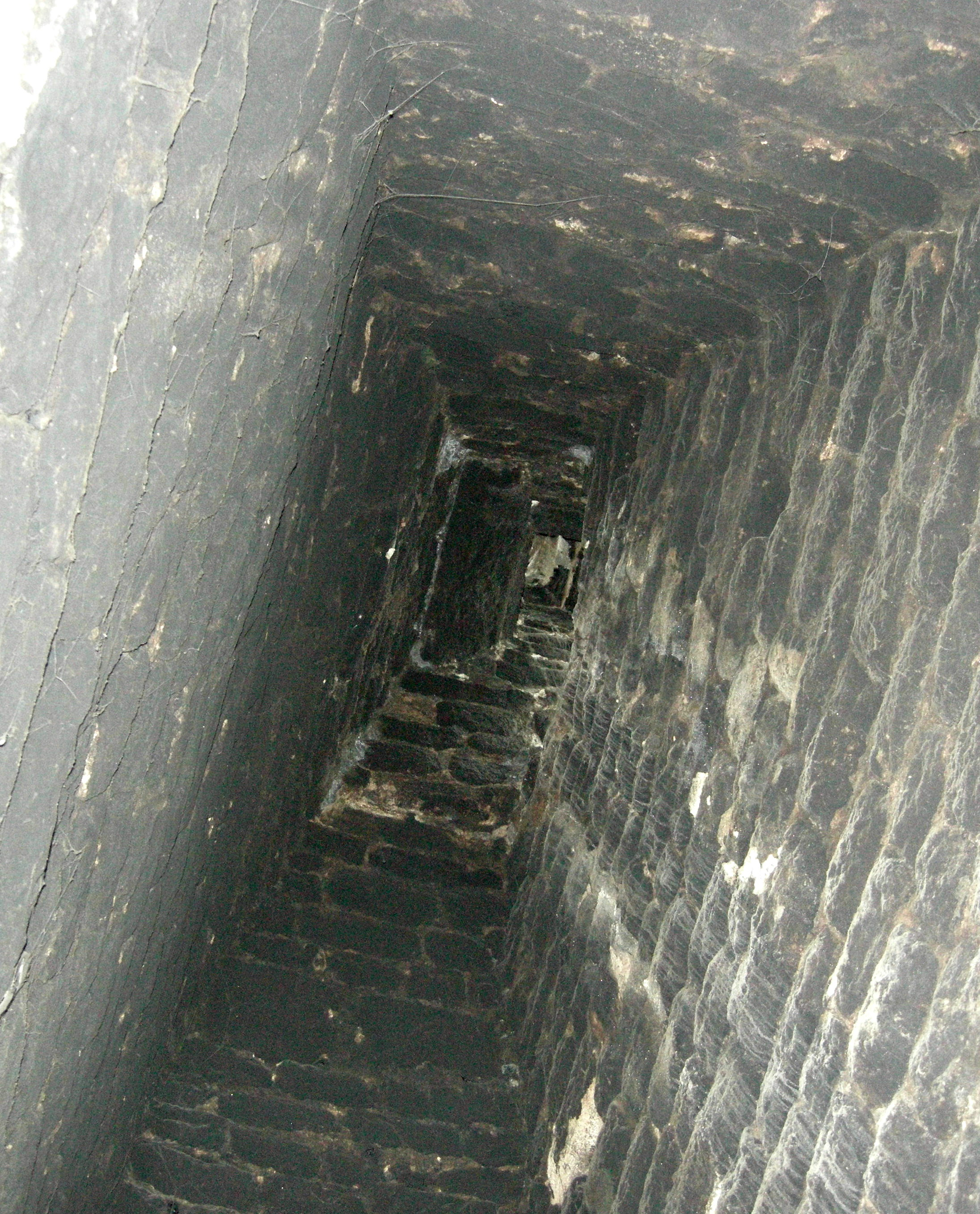
View up the chimney

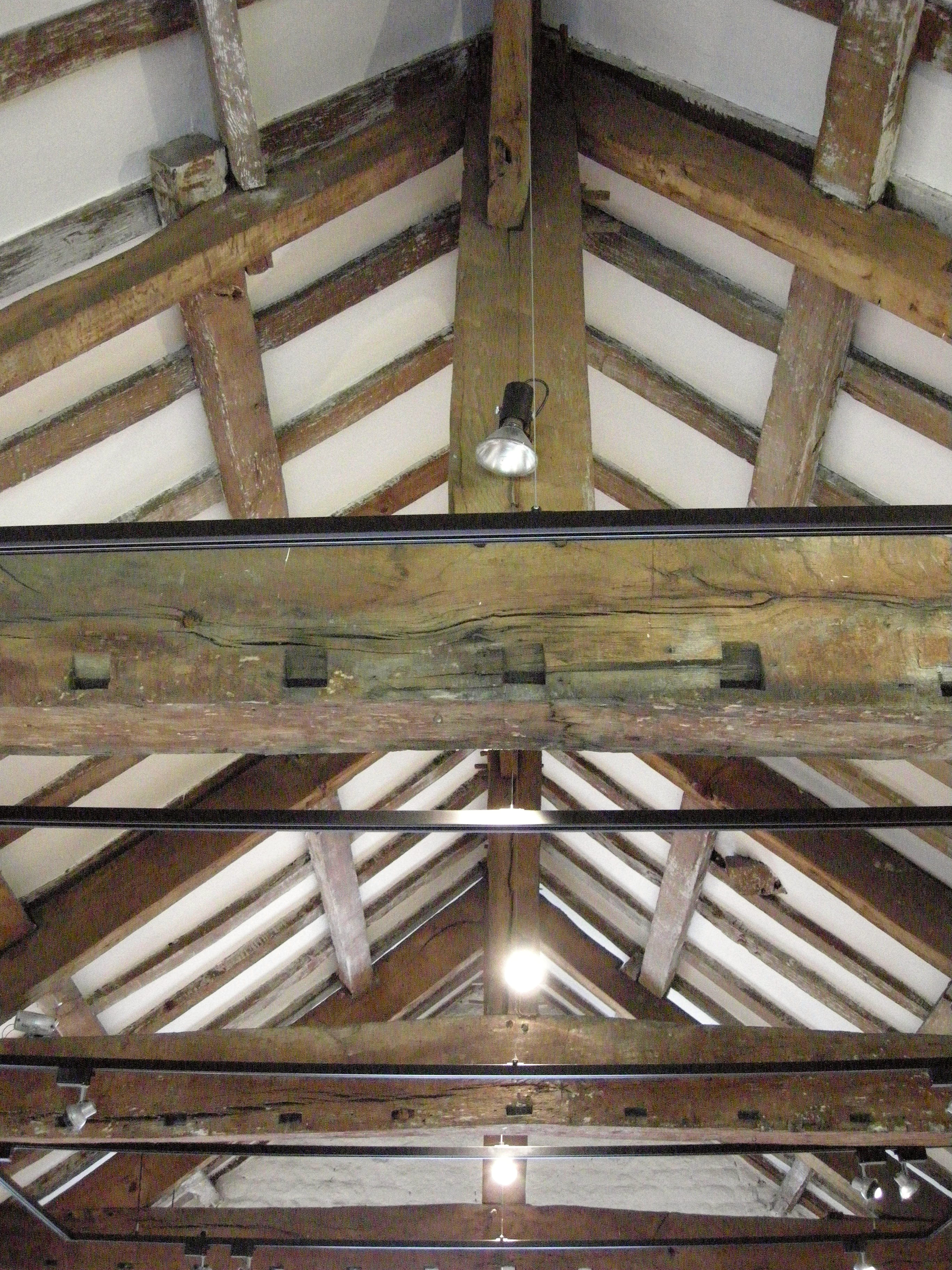
15th-16th century roof interior.

== Educational facility ==
The Manor House, specifically the ground floor room of the solar wing (now known as the 'Heritage Room'), is used for educational purposes and various local schools visit to learn about the history of the area. Children usually learn about Roman British history as this fits in with the national curriculum. At the House, children can learn about: the remains of the Roman fort; the life of a Roman soldier in Britain, including the replica of a Roman helmet; Roman British military campaigns; the operation of the fort and vicus. In addition, visitors to Ilkley Manor House can read the two new interpretation boards: 'Discover the History of the Roman Fort' is opposite the Roman wall to the west of the House and discusses the occupation of the site by the Romans; the second, 'Journey Back in Time', is near the Northern Gate Marker to the north-east of the House and discusses what life may have been like.

== See also ==
- Grade I listed buildings in West Yorkshire
- Listed buildings in Ilkley
- List of museums in West Yorkshire
