= Colour Experience =

Former museum in Bradford, West Yorkshire, England

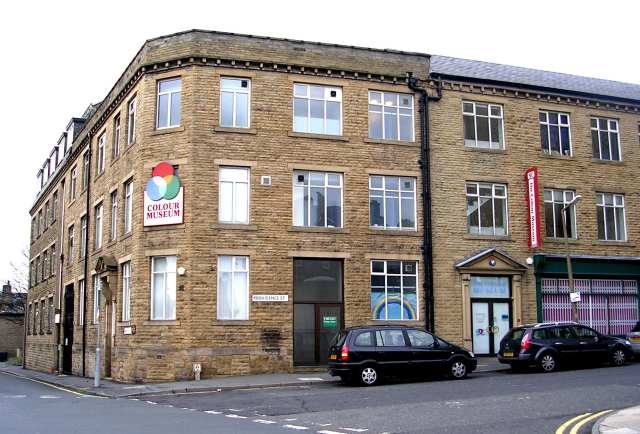
- Colour Museum (2007)
- Former name: The Colour Museum
- Coordinates: 53°47′43.2″N 1°45′32.9″W
- Website: Society of Dyers and Colourists

The Colour Experience (formerly known as The Colour Museum) was a visitor attraction and museum in Bradford, West Yorkshire, England.

The museum covered the science of light and colour. It was run by the Society of Dyers and Colourists as an educational charity. Educational workshops were provided for school groups. It was closed to the public in 2006 and is now permanently shut.

== See also ==
- Gordon Rintoul, former curator.
