= Ilkley Roman Fort =

Roman Fort in West Yorkshire, England

- Olicana
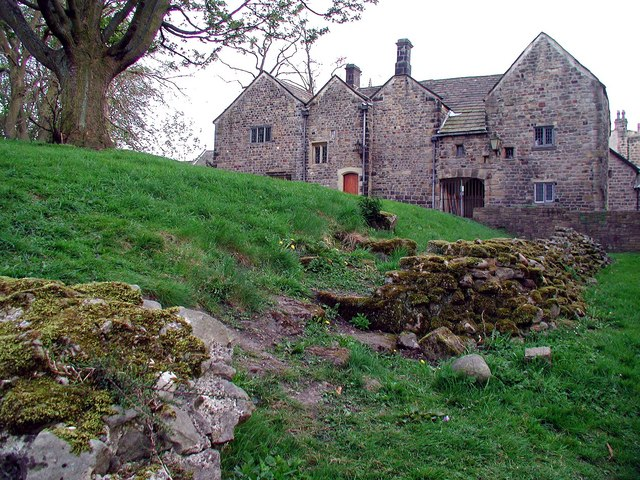
- Remains of the outer walls at the Roman Fort, looking towards Ilkley Manor House

- Location within West Yorkshire
- 53.927°N 1.825°W
- Location: Ilkley, West Yorkshire, England

History
- Founded: c. 80 AD
- Built: Titus
- Abandoned: 4th - 5th century AD

Site notes
- Excavation dates: 1919-21

Ilkley Roman Fort is a Roman fort on the south bank of the River Wharfe, at the centre of the modern town of Ilkley, a Victorian spa town in West Yorkshire, England.

== Identification ==
The traditional view is that Olicana is the fort at Ilkley, but the identification is not settled. Ptolemy mentions Olikana in his Geographia (c. 150), although Rivet and Smith give Olenacum as the proper form of the name, rejecting Ptolemy's Olikana as corrupt. The 1086 Domesday Book gives Ilecliue also variants Illecliue, Illiclei and Illicleia for Ilkley. Modern scholarship has, however, suggested that the Roman name would be better applied to the fort at Elslack (Eleslac in Domesday Book) near Skipton.

Rivet and Smith suggest the name Verbeia instead, this being the Roman name for the River Wharfe. An altar-stone dedicated to the goddess Verbeia is thought to originate from the site.

== History ==
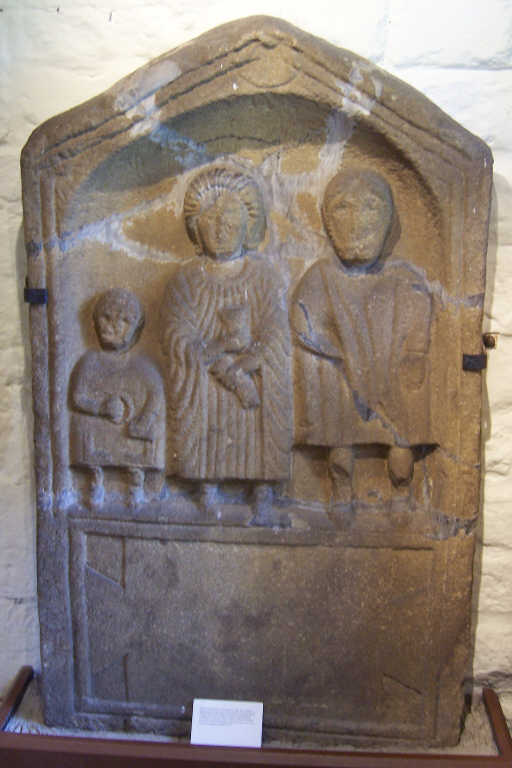
Roman gravestone found in Ilkley

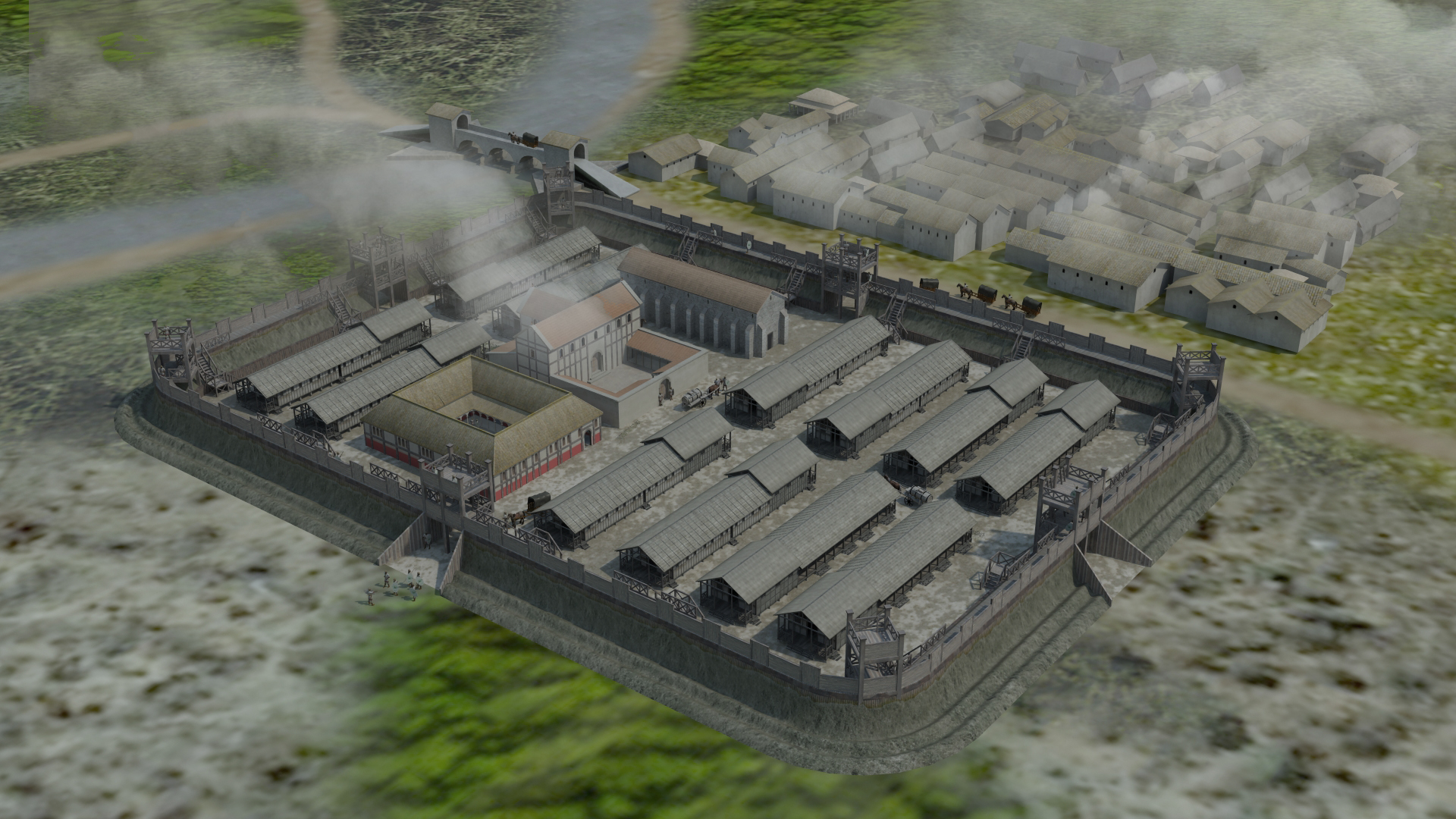
The Roman Turf & Timber Fort of Olicana - Ilkley - Yorkshire.

The first fort at Ilkley was founded by Agricola around 80 AD and was largely constructed of wood, but this was later abandoned in the 120s. A second fort was erected around 161 AD which survived for 30 years, before being burnt down, perhaps during a documented rebellion by the inhabitants of northern Britain. It was immediately replaced by a stone fort which survived until the end of the Roman period. The fort was abandoned in the late 4th or early 5th century.

A substantial civil settlement, the vicus, formed the nucleus of the village that followed. Excavations have yet to reveal continuous habitation from Roman times, but it is quite likely that a village established itself within the ramparts of the fort following the Roman departure. Anglo-Saxon settlement probably did not take place until well into the seventh century, and the sculptured crosses are evidence of a church here in the eighth and ninth centuries.

== The site today ==
A wall, once part of the fort, can still be seen from the back of Ilkley Manor House, which stands on the site. Around the area are four signs showing the edges of the walls of the fort. The area of the fort extends underneath the Manor House and nearby All Saints Parish Church whilst the vicus probably existed from the car park in the centre of Ilkley to Christchurch on The Grove. The church and Manor House both have a collection of Roman altars and tombstones, Anglo-Saxon crosses, and Medieval tombstones. The Roman altars date to the reigns of Antoninus Pius (138 to 161), and Septimius Severus and his son Caracalla (211 to 217).
