= All Saints' Parish Church, Ilkley =

All Saints' Church
- Parish Church of All Saints, Ilkley
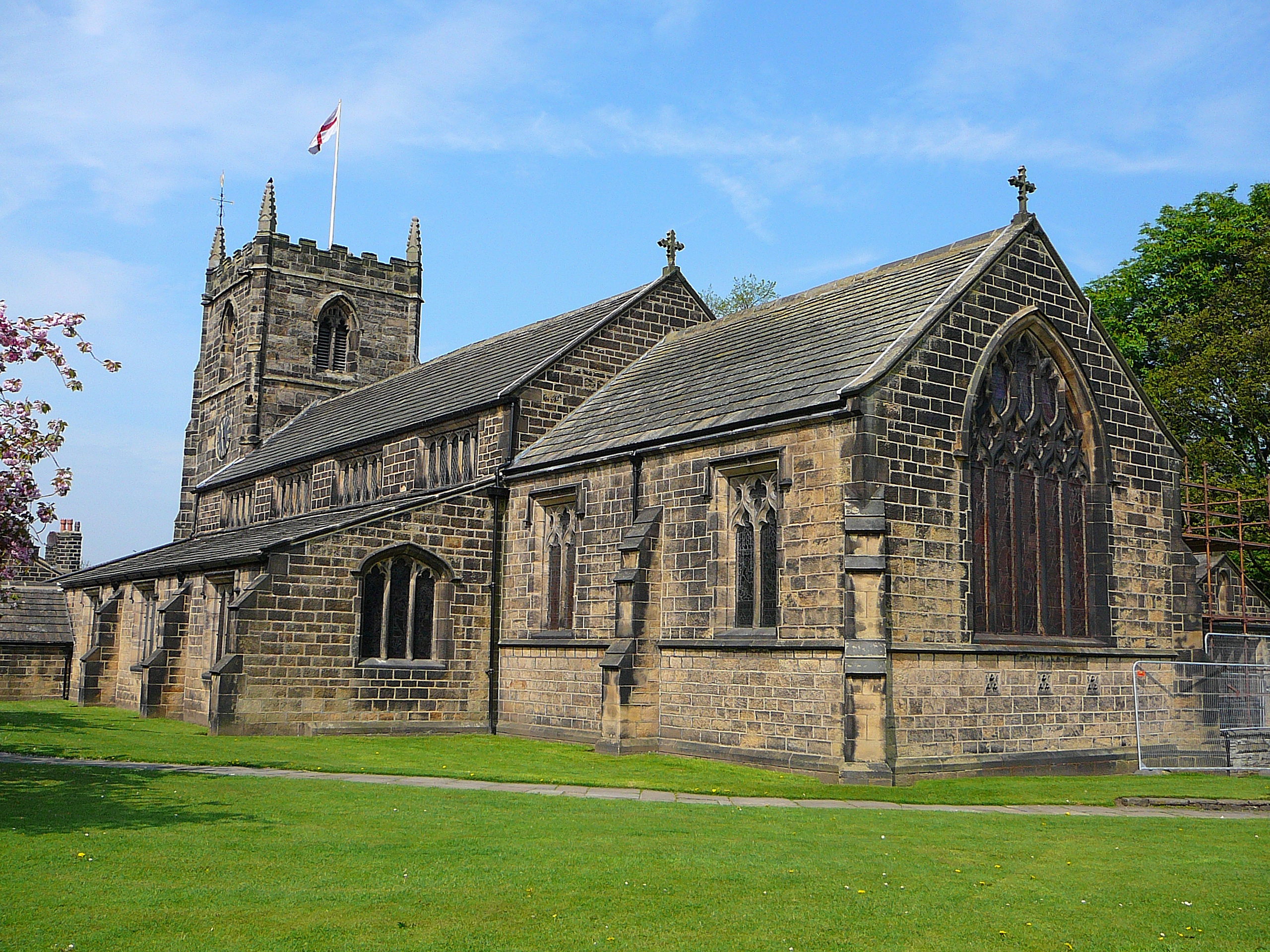
- All Saints' Church
- 53.9265°N 1.8242°W
- OS grid reference: SE 11645 47825
- Location: Ilkley, West Yorkshire
- Country: England
- Denomination: Church of England
- Churchmanship: Evangelical

History
- Status: Parish Church

Architecture
- Heritage designation: Grade II* listed building
- Architect(s): Mallinson & Healey (19th century extension and restoration)

Specifications
- Materials: Dressed sandstone with slate roofs

Administration
- Province: York
- Diocese: Leeds
- Parish: Ilkley

The Parish Church of All Saints in Ilkley in West Yorkshire, England is an active Anglican parish church in the archdeaconry of Bradford and the Diocese of Leeds.

== History ==
The church is built on the site of a Roman fort, two Roman altars have been discovered in 1925 built into the tower. Three 8th-century Anglo-Saxon stone crosses, now incomplete, used to be in the churchyard but are now inside, below the tower. The earliest part of the church is the 13th century south doorway. The nave of the church dates back to the 14th century while the tower is of 15th century construction. The church was extended and restored between 1860 and 1861 by Bradford architects Mallinson & Healey. The vestry was extended in 1927 which was subsequently converted into a war memorial chapel following the Second World War. The church was grade II* listed on 18 July 1949.

== Architectural style ==
=== Exterior ===
The church is largely of a Tudor-Gothic style, with 15th and 16th-century work in essentially the same style. The church has a three-stage perpendicular tower with diagonal buttresses and a clock on the south face. The nave has four bays and five light clerestorey windows on the south side and four-light windows dating from 1880 on the north.

=== Interior ===
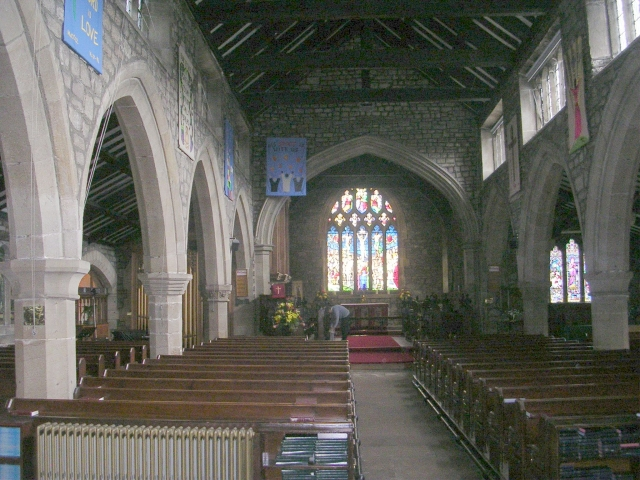
Interior

The church's four-bay arcades have octagonal piers. The church is stone-tiled, the chancel has mosaic tiles and the walls are exposed stone. The church has an undecorated medieval tub font on a 19th-century pedestal. The pulpit dates from 1889 and of a square wooden form with centre panels with depictions of Jesus and the disciples.

== See also ==
- Grade II* listed buildings in Bradford
- Listed buildings in Ilkley
