= Energy management =

Planning and operation of energy production and energy consumption units

Energy management includes planning and operation of energy production and energy consumption units as well as energy distribution and storage. Energy management is performed via energy management systems (EMS), which are designed with hardware and software components to implement the tasks. Energy management can be classified into building energy management, grid-scale energy management (including grid energy storage), and marine energy management.

Energy management objectives are resource conservation, climate protection and cost savings, while the users have permanent access to the energy they need. It is connected closely to environmental management, production management, logistics and other established business functions. The VDI-Guideline 4602 released a definition which includes the economic dimension: "Energy management is the proactive, organized and systematic coordination of procurement, conversion, distribution and use of energy to meet the requirements, taking into account environmental and economic objectives". It is a systematic endeavor to optimize energy efficiency for specific political, economic, and environmental objectives through engineering and management techniques.

The framework most widely used to structure such a system is ISO 50001, an international standard published by the International Organization for Standardization. ISO 50001 specifies requirements for establishing, implementing, maintaining, and improving an energy management system, providing organizations a systematic approach to achieve continual improvement in energy performance, energy efficiency, and energy use.

== Energy efficiency ==
=== Base line of energy assessment ===
One of the initial steps for an effective energy cost control program is the base line energy assessment, which examines the pattern of existing energy usage by the government or any sub-entity of the government or private organization. This program will set the reference point for improvements in energy efficiency. Energy efficiency can improve the existing energy usage and benchmarking of every individual section such as area, sub-area, and the industry.

== Organizational integration ==
It is important to integrate the energy management in the organizational structure, so that the energy management can be implemented. Responsibilities and the interaction of the decision makers should be regularized. The delegation of functions and competencies extend from the top management to the executive worker. Furthermore, a comprehensive coordination can ensure the fulfillment of the tasks. This kind of organizational integration is one of the core requirements of ISO 50001, which requires top management to demonstrate leadership and commitment to the energy management system, for example by defining an energy policy, assigning roles and responsibilities, and ensuring that necessary resources are made available.

It is advisable to establish a separate organizational unit "energy management" in large or energy-intensive companies. This unit supports the senior management and keeps track. It depends on the basic form of the organizational structure, where this unit is connected. In case of a functional organization the unit is located directly between the first (CEO) and the second hierarchical level (corporate functions such as production, procurement, marketing). In a divisional organization, there should be a central and several sector-specific energy management units. So the diverse needs of the individual sectors and the coordination between the branches and the head office can be fulfilled. In a matrix organization the energy management can be included as a matrix function and thus approach most functions directly.

== Energy management in operational functions ==
=== Facility management ===
Facility management is an important part of energy management, because a huge proportion (average 25 per cent) of complete operating costs are energy costs. According to the International Facility Management Association (IFMA), facility management is "a profession that encompasses multiple disciplines to ensure functionality of the built environment by integrating people, place, processes and technology".

The central task of energy management is to reduce costs for the provision of energy in buildings and facilities without compromising work processes. Especially the availability and service life of the equipment and the ease of use should remain the same. The German Facility Management Association (GEFMA e.V.) has published guidelines (e.g. GEFMA 124-1 and 124–2), which contain methods and ways of dealing with the integration of energy management in the context of a successful facility management. In this topic the facility manager has to deal with economic, ecological, risk-based and quality-based targets. He tries to minimize the total cost of the energy-related processes (supply, distribution and use).

The passive house uses a combination of low-energy building techniques and technologies.

The most important key figure in this context is kilowatt-hours per square meter per year (kWh/m^{2}a). Based on this key figure properties can be classified according to their energy consumption.

- Europe: In Germany a low-energy house can have a maximum energy consumption of 70 kWh/m^{2}a.
- North America: In the United States, the ENERGY STAR program is the largest program defining low-energy homes. Homes earning ENERGY STAR certification use at least 15% less energy than standard new homes built to the International Residential Code, although homes typically achieve 20–30% savings.

In comparison, the passive house ultra-low-energy standard, currently undergoing adoption in some other European countries, has a maximum space heating requirement of 15 kWh/m^{2}a. A passive house is a very well insulated and virtually airtight building. It does not require a conventional heating system. It is heated by solar gain and internal gains from people. Energy losses are minimized.

There are also buildings that produce more energy (for example by solar water heating or photovoltaic systems) over the course of a year than it imports from external sources. These buildings are called energy-plus-houses.

In addition, the work regulations manage competencies, roles and responsibilities. Because the systems also include risk factors (e.g. oil tanks, gas lines), you must ensure that all tasks are clearly described and distributed. A clear regulation can help to avoid liability risks.

In facility management, energy management systems are used to monitor and control building systems such as heating, ventilation, and lighting. Integration with automation technologies enables more efficient operation of facilities and reduced energy consumption.

=== Logistics ===
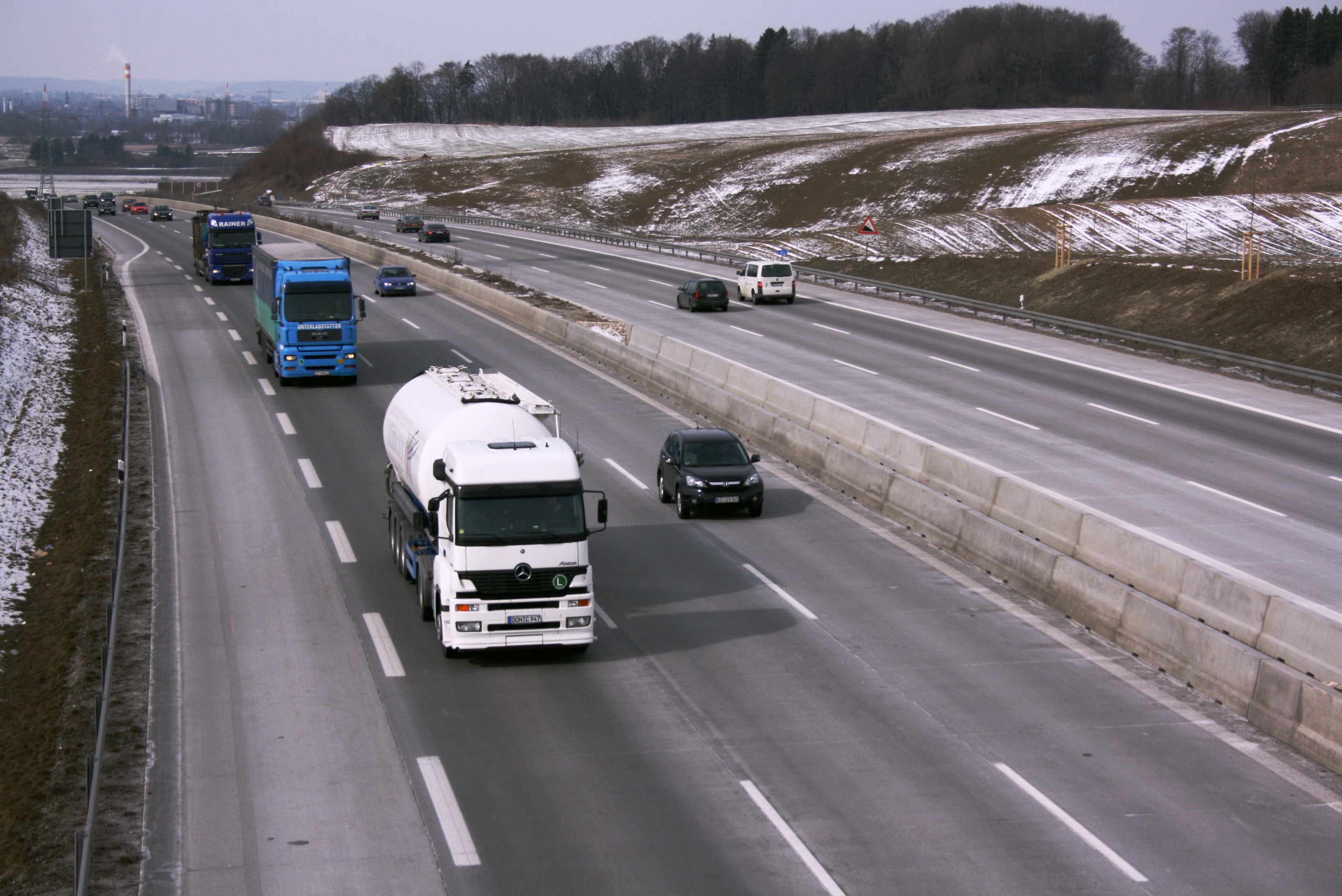
Carriage of goods

Logistics is the management of the flow of resources between the point of origin and the point of destination in order to meet some requirements - for example of customers or corporations. Especially the core logistics task, transportation of the goods, can save costs and protect the environment through efficient energy management. The relevant factors are the choice of means of transportation, duration and length of transportation, and cooperation with logistics service providers.

Transport logistics accounts for more than 24% of CO_{2} emissions worldwide. For this reason Green Logistics has become more prevalent in business.

Possible courses of action in terms of green logistics are:

- Shift to ecofriendly transport carrier such as railroad and waterway
- Route and load optimization
- Formation of corporate networks that are connected by logistics services
- Optimizing physical logistics processes by providing sophisticated IT support

Besides transportation of goods, the transport of persons should be an important part of the logistic strategy of organizations. For business trips, it can be important to attract attention to the choice and the proportionality of the means of transport. It can be balanced whether a physical presence is mandatory or a telephone or video conference is just as useful. Home Office is another possibility in which the company can protect the environment indirectly.

=== Energy procurement ===
Procurement is the acquisition of goods or services. Energy prices fluctuate constantly, which can significantly affect the energy bill of organizations. Therefore, poor energy procurement decisions can be expensive. Organizations can control and reduce energy costs by taking a proactive and efficient approach to buying energy. Even a change of the energy source can be a profitable and eco-friendly alternative.

=== Production ===
Production is the act of creating output, a good or service which has value and contributes to the utility of individuals. This central process may differ depending on the industry. Industrial companies have facilities that require a lot of energy. Service companies, in turn, do not need many materials, their energy-related focus is mainly facility management or Green IT. Therefore, the energy-related focus has to be identified first, then evaluated and optimized.

=== Production planning and control ===
Production is typically the area with the largest energy consumption within an organization. Therefore, also the production planning and control becomes very important. It deals with the operational, temporal, quantitative and spatial planning, control and management of all processes that are necessary in the production of goods and commodities. The "production planner" should plan the production processes so that they operate in an energy efficient way. For example, a strong power consumer can be moved into the night time. Peaks should be avoided for the benefit of a unified load profile.

The impending changes in the structure of energy production require an increasing demand for storage capacity. The production planning and control has to deal with the problem of limited storability of energy. In principle there is the possibility to store energy electrically, mechanically, or chemically, and is further proven to be benefitial if practiced since the studies shows that "coupling of demand side management and storage technologies" can help "achieve 88% energy self-sufficuency for a manufacturing system." Another trend-setting technology is lithium-based electrochemical storage, which can be used in electric vehicles or as an option to control the power grid. The German Federal Ministry of Economics and Technology realized the significance of this topic and established an initiative with the aim to promote technological breakthroughs and support the rapid introduction of new energy storage.

=== Maintenance ===
Maintenance is the combination of all technical and administrative actions, including supervision actions, intended to retain an item in, or restore it to, a state in which it can perform a required function. Detailed maintenance is essential to support the energy management. Hereby power losses and cost increases can be avoided.

==== Energy management challenge ====
Energy efficiency and management is key for industries worldwide.

Examples of how it is possible to save energy and costs with the help of maintenance:

- Defrost the fridges
- Check the barometer of cars and trucks
- Insulation of hot systems
- Improve leaks in building envelopes

== Energy strategies ==
A long-term energy strategy should be part of the overall strategy of a company. This strategy may include the objective of increasing the use of renewable energies. Furthermore, criteria for decisions on energy investments, such as yield expectations, are determined. By formulating an energy strategy companies have the opportunity to avoid risks and to assure a competitive advance against their business rivals.

=== Potential energy strategies ===
According to Kals, these are the energy strategies:

- Passive Strategy: There is no systematic planning. The issue of energy and environmental management is not perceived as an independent field of action. The organization only deals with the most essential subjects.
- Strategy of short-term profit maximization: The management is concentrating exclusively on measures that have a relatively short payback period and a high return. Measures with low profitability are not considered.
- Strategy of long-term profit maximization: This strategy includes that you have a high knowledge of the energy price and technology development. The relevant measures (for example, heat exchangers or power stations) can have durations of several decades. Moreover, these measures can help to improve the image and increase the motivation of the employees.
- Realization of all financially attractive energy measures: This strategy has the goal to implement all measures that have a positive return on investment.
- Maximum strategy: For the climate protection one is willing to change even the object of the company.

In reality, you usually find hybrid forms of different strategies.

=== Energy strategies of companies ===
Many companies are trying to promote its image and time protect the climate through a proactive and public energy strategy. General Motors (GM) strategy is based on continuous improvement. Furthermore, they have six principles: e.g. restoring and preserving the environment, reducing waste and pollutants, educating the public about environmental conservation, collaboration for the development of environmental laws and regulations.

Nokia created its first climate strategy in 2006. The strategy tries to evaluate the energy consumption and greenhouse gas emissions of products and operations and sets reduction targets accordingly. Furthermore, their environmental efforts is based on four key issues: substance management, energy efficiency, recycling, promoting environmental sustainability.

The energy strategy of Volkswagen (VW) is based on environmentally friendly products and a resource-efficient production according to the "Group Strategy 2018". Almost all locations of the Group are certified to the international standard ISO 14001 for environmental management systems.

Greenwashing is the incorporation of green strategies to create an environmentally friendly image of an organization, despite action indicating otherwise. It can be weaponized to delay environmental action.

=== Energy strategies of governments ===
Even many countries formulate energy strategies. The Swiss Federal Council decided in May 2011 to resign nuclear energy medium-dated. The nuclear power plants will be shut down at the end of life and will not be replaced. In Compensation they put the focus on energy efficiency, renewable energies, fossil energy sources and the development of water power.

The European Union has clear instructions for its members. The "20-20-20-targets" include, that the Member States have to reduce greenhouse gas emissions by 20% below 1990 levels, increase energy efficiency by 20% and achieve a 20% share of renewable energy in total energy consumption by 2020.

=== Ethical and normative basis of the energy strategies ===
The basis of every energy strategy is the corporate culture and the related ethical standards applying in the company. Ethics, in the sense of business ethics, examines ethical principles and moral or ethical issues that arise in a business environment. Ethical standards can appear in company guidelines, energy and environmental policies or other documents.

The most relevant ethical ideas for the energy management are:

- Utilitarianism: This form of ethics has the maxim that the one acts are good or right, whose consequences are optimal for the welfare of all those affected by the action (principle of maximum happiness). In terms of energy management, the existence of external costs should be considered. They do not directly affect those who profit from the economic activity but non-participants like future generations. This error in the market mechanism can be solved by the internalization of external costs.
- Argumentation Ethics: This fundamental ethical idea says that everyone who is affected by the decision, must be involved in decision making. This is done in a fair dialogue, the result is completely uncertain.
- Deontological ethics: The deontological ethics assigns individuals and organizations certain obligations. A general example is the Golden Rule: "One should treat others as one would like others to treat oneself." Therefore, everyone should manage their duties and make an energy economic contribution.

== See also ==
- Energy demand management
- Energy management (degree) – specialized degree for those working in the petroleum industry
- Energy management system
- Energy storage as a service (ESaaS)
- Federal Energy Management Program
- Power management – by electrical devices

Management of energy in particular contexts:

- Hotel energy management
- Marine energy management
