= Equans Services =

- Formerly: Alizé Gestion Technique d'Immeubles (1992–c. 2000s); Axima Services; Cofely Services; Engie Services Inc. (–2022); Bouygues Energies & Services Canada (–2025)
- Type: Subsidiary
- Industry: Facility management; Building automation; Energy services
- Founded: 1992; 34 years ago
- Headquarters: Montreal, Quebec, Canada
- Area served: Canada; United States
- Key people: Lane Brennan (president and CEO)
- Services: Integrated facility management; Building automation; Energy efficiency; Public-private partnership delivery; Transportation electrification
- Number of employees: 1,100
- Parent: Equans (Bouygues)
- Website: equansservices.com

Equans Services (formerly Engie Services) is an integrated facility management and building services company operating in Canada and the United States, headquartered in Montreal, Quebec. The company is a unit of Equans, the multi-technical services group owned by French construction conglomerate Bouygues since 2022. It provides integrated facility management, building automation, energy efficiency, decarbonization and public-private partnership services.

Alizé logo

Axima logo

Cofely Services logo

== History ==
The company was founded in 1992 as Alizé Gestion Technique d'Immeubles Inc., with its first mandate covering six buildings owned by SITQ in Montreal. During the 1990s, the company expanded its facility management activities across Quebec and developed services in energy management, computerized maintenance management systems (CMMS), and energy performance contracting. In 2001, the company acquired Tri-Air, a company specialising in heating, ventilation, and air conditioning (HVAC) controls. In 2005, Alizé Gestion Technique d'Immeubles was renamed Axima Services. During the same year, the company acquired a 50% interest in Contrôles AC, a Quebec-based building automation company. The company entered the United States market in 2007 with a facility management contract at Louisville Airport. Its U.S. airport operations expanded in 2008 through a contract at Boston Logan International Airport. Following the merger of Gaz de France and Suez, Axima Services was renamed Cofely Services in 2009. After GDF Suez adopted the name Engie in 2016, Cofely Services became Engie Services.

Engie logo

In 2018, Engie Services acquired PBW High Voltage Ltd. and purchased the remaining shares of Contrôles AC, making it a wholly owned subsidiary. During the same year, the company established Engie Transport CM Canada, a joint venture with Engie Inéo to provide electrification and railway infrastructure services in North America.

ouygues Energies & Services logo

In July 2021, Engie consolidated its multi-technical services businesses worldwide under the Equans brand, creating a standalone business unit. Later that year, Bouygues signed an agreement to acquire Equans from Engie.

The acquisition of Equans by Bouygues was completed in October 2022 and Engie Services Inc. was renamed Equans Services Inc. In March 2025, Bouygues Energies & Services Canada Limited (BYES Canada) adopted the Equans Services brand.

== Operations ==
Equans Services is headquartered in Montreal, Quebec, and operates in Canada and the United States. Contrôles AC is a subsidiary of Equans Services that specializes in building automation systems and controls for electromechanical building systems, including heating, ventilation and air conditioning, lighting, air quality, energy and water management, security systems, gas detection, and thermography. The company also previously operated a transportation division, Equans Transport, in partnership with the French subsidiary of Equans in France, Ineo. The division provided railway electrification and overhead catenary system installation for public transit infrastructure projects.

== Services ==
Equans Services provides integrated facility management, building automation, energy-efficiency services, and public-private partnership (P3) project delivery for commercial, institutional, industrial, and public-sector clients. Its activities include facility operation and maintenance, mechanical and electrical services, building automation and controls, energy-performance contracting, and the long-term operation and maintenance of public infrastructure delivered through P3 agreements.

=== Decarbonization and energy efficiency ===
Equans Services provides energy-efficiency and decarbonization services for commercial, institutional and industrial buildings around frameworks such as the Science Based Targets initiative, which sets emissions-reduction trajectories aligned with limiting global warming to 1.5 degrees Celsius. It includes assessing carbon emissions, establishing emissions-reduction targets, improving building operations, recovering internal thermal loads, electrifying heating systems, and changing energy sources. Through its Contrôles AC unit, Equans Services implements demand-side management measures, including pre-heating buildings before periods of peak electricity demand, temporarily reducing non-essential heating and ventilation loads, and using alternative energy sources available on site.

== Projects ==
=== Energy Services Acquisition Program ===
In June 2019, the company joined the Innovate Energy consortium. The public-private partnership covers the modernization, operation and maintenance of the district energy system serving federal buildings in Canada's National Capital Region, including the Parliament Buildings. The project includes the conversion of the existing steam-based district energy network to a low-temperature hot-water system under a 35-year agreement.

=== Library and Archives Canada preservation facility ===
In 2019, it entered into a public-private partnership with Library and Archives Canada to design, build, finance, maintain and operate a new preservation facility in Gatineau, Quebec. Construction began in August 2019 and was completed in June 2022. The facility became the first net zero carbon archival preservation building in the Americas.

=== Réseau express métropolitain ===
Since 2019, Equans Transport has worked as part of the NouvLR consortium on the engineering, procurement and construction of the overhead catenary power system for the Réseau express métropolitain (REM), an automated light rail network in the Montreal region.

=== Montreal International Airport ===
In 2022, Equans Services began expanding the baggage screening and handling system at Montréal–Trudeau International Airport. The project included the installation of a fifth explosive detection imaging system, the construction of a new baggage inspection room, and the expansion of screening facilities to comply with the requirements of the Canadian Air Transport Security Authority (CATSA). The upgraded system increased baggage processing capacity for domestic and international flights by 25%, from 2,200 to 2,800 bags per hour. The project was completed in 2023.

=== Centre for Addiction and Mental Health ===
Since 2019, Equans Services has operated and maintained the technical systems at the Centre for Addiction and Mental Health (CAMH) in Toronto under a contract with Ontario's Ministry of Health. The company provides facility management services, including maintenance of HVAC, building automation, security, and critical hospital infrastructure for the hospital's facilities, which opened in 2020 as part of a campus redevelopment project.

=== Toronto and Region Conservation Authority ===
Equans Services provides facility management services for the Toronto and Region Conservation Authority (TRCA) headquarters in Toronto. Its responsibilities include the operation and maintenance of the building's geothermal HVAC system, building automation, mechanical and electrical systems, energy management, and other technical and support services for the mass timber office building.

=== Other contracts ===
In 2026, Equans Services Inc. was awarded a contract by the National Research Council of Canada to provide electromechanical maintenance, renovation and construction services across two lots in the Quebec Region, including the Greater Montreal area, running from June 12, 2026, to March 31, 2029.

== Public activities ==
Equans Services supports community and charitable initiatives in Canada. The company has partnered with Indspire, a national Indigenous charity that provides educational programs and scholarships for First Nations, Inuit, and Métis students. It has also participated in Défi Sans Auto Solo, an annual campaign in Quebec that encourages sustainable commuting, and has supported Les Scientifines, a Montreal-based non-profit organization that promotes science and technology education for girls from underrepresented communities.
