= Physical plant =

Necessary infrastructure used to maintain a facility

A physical plant, also known as a building plant, mechanical plant, or industrial plant (often simply referred to as a plant where the context is clear), refers to the technical infrastructure used in the operation and maintenance of a facility. The operation of these technical systems and services, or the department within an organization responsible for them, is commonly referred to as plant operations or facility management.

== Power plants ==
=== Nuclear power ===
The design and equipment of nuclear power plants have, for the most part, remained largely unchanged over the past 30 years. There are three primary types of reactor cooling mechanisms: light water reactors, liquid metal reactors, and high-temperature gas-cooled reactors. Although the core equipment has remained consistent, some minor modifications have been implemented to improve safety and efficiency. While significant design innovations have been proposed for all three reactor types, these remain largely theoretical and have not been widely implemented.

Nuclear power plant equipment is generally classified into two main categories: primary systems and balance-of-plant systems. Primary systems include equipment essential to the production and safety of nuclear power. Key components include the reactor vessel, which typically surrounds the core to provide protection, and the reactor core itself, which contains the fuel rods. Cooling systems are composed of liquid cooling loops and circulating coolant, usually arranged as separate systems with at least one pump per loop. Additional components include steam generators and pressurizers, which help regulate plant pressure as needed. Containment systems refer to the physical structures designed to shield the external environment in case of reactor malfunction. Emergency core cooling systems and reactor protection systems are also part of the primary systems.

Balance-of-plant systems refer to equipment commonly used across various types of power plants for power generation and distribution. These include turbines, generators, condensers, feedwater systems, auxiliary systems, fire protection systems, emergency power supply systems, and used fuel storage facilities.

== Broadcast engineering ==
In broadcast engineering, the term transmitter plant refers to the portion of the physical plant associated with the transmitter, its controls and inputs, the studio-transmitter link (if the radio studio is off-site), the radio antenna and radomes, feedline and desiccation or nitrogen systems, broadcast tower and associated building, tower lighting, generator, and air conditioning systems. These components are often monitored by an automatic transmission system, which transmits status updates via telemetry through the studio-transmitter link.

== Telecommunication plants ==
=== Fibre-optic telecommunications ===
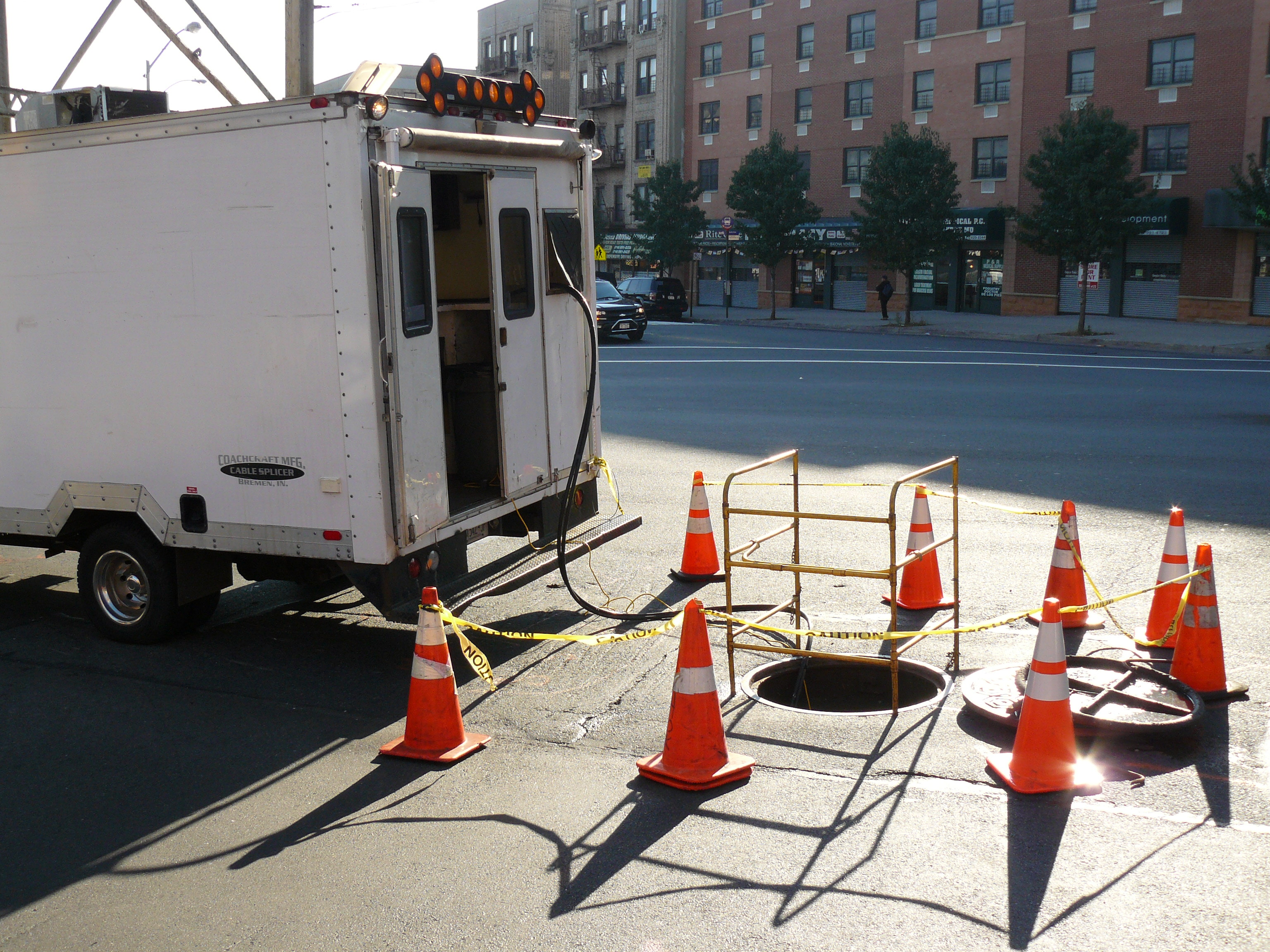
Fiber-optic splicing in a mobile lab.

Economic factors, such as capital and operational expenditures, have led to the widespread use of Passive Optical Networks (PON) as the primary model for connecting users to the fibre-optic plant. A central office hub employs transmission equipment that enables signal distribution to between one and 32 users per line. The main fibre backbone in a PON network is known as the optical line terminal. Operational considerations—such as maintenance requirements, equipment sharing efficiency, fibre-sharing capabilities, and potential future expansion—determine which specific PON variant is deployed.

A fiber-optic splitter is used to connect multiple users to the same fibre backbone. One variant, Ethernet Passive Optical Network (EPON), can support up to 704 connections per line. Fibre networks based on a PON backbone offer various configurations for last-mile connectivity, including fibre to the curb (FTTC), fibre to the building (FTTB), and fibre to the home (FTTH). These systems use different wavelengths to transmit and receive data simultaneously without interference.

=== Cellular telecommunications ===
Base stations are a critical component of mobile telecommunications infrastructure, serving to connect end users to the main network. These stations house transmission equipment protected by physical barriers and are typically mounted on masts or on the roofs or sides of buildings. The placement of a base station is determined by local radio frequency (RF) coverage requirements. Various types of antennas are used—either mounted on buildings or on natural landscapes—to transmit and receive signals. Directional antennas focus signals in specific directions, while line-of-sight radio-communication antennas facilitate communication between base stations.

Base stations are generally classified into three categories: macro cells, micro cells, and pico cells. Macro cells are the most common and often use omnidirectional antennas or radio-communication dishes. Micro cells are designed to supplement coverage in areas not adequately served by macro cells. These are usually mounted on streetlights and typically do not require radio-communication dishes, as they are interconnected through fibre-optic cables. Pico cells provide targeted indoor coverage in locations where signal strength is insufficient. These are usually installed on interior walls or rooftops within buildings.

== Desalination plants ==
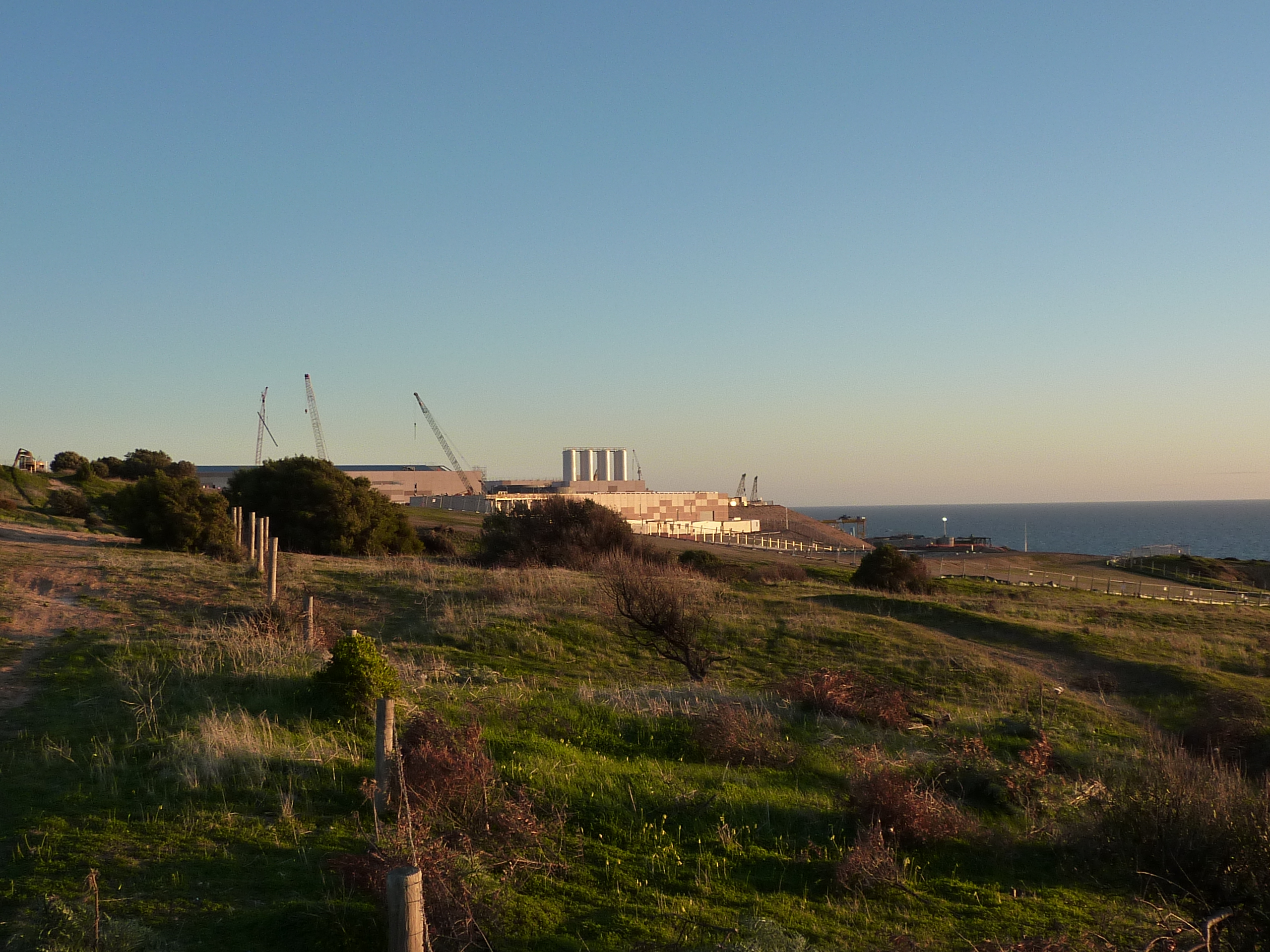
Port Stanvac Desalination Plant by the water.

Desalination plants are facilities designed to remove salt and other impurities from water sources, making the water suitable for human consumption and other uses. The primary processes and technologies used in desalination include reverse osmosis, multi-stage flash distillation (MSF), and multi-effect distillation (MED). Thermal technologies such as MSF and MED are widely used in the Middle East due to limited freshwater availability and access to surplus energy resources.

=== Reverse osmosis ===
Reverse osmosis (RO) plants use semi-permeable membrane polymers that allow water molecules to pass through while blocking salts and other impurities. These systems typically employ intake pipes to draw water from the source, which is then directed to pre-treatment centres. Pre-treatment involves the removal of suspended particles and the addition of chemicals to prevent scaling and fouling.

High-pressure (HR) pumps and booster pumps are used to maintain the required pressure throughout the system, facilitating water movement through the reverse osmosis modules. Depending on the system specifications, RO membranes can remove between 98% and 99.5% of salt content from the water. Waste byproducts from the pre-treatment and RO processes are transferred to energy recovery units, with remaining waste discharged via outfall pipes. Control systems continuously monitor operations to ensure optimal performance.

Pre-treatment systems also include intake screening equipment, such as forebays and screens. Intake designs vary; open-ocean intakes may be located onshore or offshore. Offshore intakes typically transfer water through concrete channels to screening chambers, which then send it to pre-treatment facilities. Chemicals are added, and solids are separated using flotation equipment before the water is filtered through the semi-permeable membrane.

=== Electrodialysis ===
Electrodialysis is an alternative to reverse osmosis that has been used in industrial applications since the 1960s. It employs cathodes and anodes in multiple stages to separate ionic compounds, concentrating the salts and leaving behind purified water. Due to its relatively high energy consumption, electrodialysis is primarily used for treating brackish water, which contains lower salt concentrations than seawater.

=== Multi-stage flash distillation ===
Multi-stage flash (MSF) distillation is a thermal desalination process commonly used in the Middle East. Like RO systems, MSF plants include water abstraction and pre-treatment systems. However, MSF uses different chemical additives such as anti-scalants and anti-corrosives. The process involves heating water at multiple stages and pressure levels until it reaches a brine heater, which generates steam at controlled conditions. This steam causes rapid boiling (flashing) in successive stages, thereby separating freshwater from the saline solution.

== Traditional water treatment plants ==
Conventional water treatment plants are designed to extract, purify, and distribute water sourced from bodies of water that are already suitable for potable use. These facilities rely on extensive networks of equipment to retrieve, store, and transport water to the plant for treatment. Water from underground water sources is typically extracted via wells, which commonly include components such as pipes, pumps, and protective shelters. If the source is located far from the treatment plant, aqueducts may be used to transport the water.

Various transport systems, including aqueducts, pipelines, and tunnels, often use open-channel flow to facilitate water delivery. This method relies on topography and gravity to move water naturally, without the need for additional pumping. Flow measurement equipment is employed to monitor the consistency and stability of water flow. Watersheds are geographical areas where surface water converges and is often collected for storage and treatment. For storm water runoff, both natural bodies of water and filtration systems may be used for temporary storage and conveyance. In contrast, non-stormwater runoffs is typically handled through on-site treatment systems such as septic tanks or via sewer networks that transport water to treatment plants.

Upon arrival at the treatment plant, water undergoes pre-treatment, during which it passes through screens (e.g. passive or bar screens) to remove debris that could damage downstream equipment. Following screening, chemicals are added using dry chemical feeders or solution metering pumps. An electromechanical chemical feed system ensures precise dosing to prevent chemical imbalances that could render the water unusable or harm plant infrastructure.

Due to increased acidity following chemical treatment, corrosion-resistant piping materials such as PVC, aluminum, and stainless steel are used for water conveyance. The next stage, coagulation, involves the addition of salts (e.g. ferric sulfate) to destabilize organic matter in a mixing tank, where variable-speed paddle mixers help determine the optimal chemical blend for the specific water source.

In flocculation basins, temperature changes help aggregate smaller particles into larger clusters. These are subsequently removed during sedimentation, which uses settling tanks—such as rectangular and centre-feed basins—to separate solids via gravity. Accumulated sediment is transferred to sludge processing facilities. Filtration then removes any remaining particulates using methods such as pressure filtration, diatomaceous earth filtration, or direct filtration. The final step is disinfection, after which the treated water is either stored or distributed for use.

=== Plant responsibility ===
Responsibilities for water treatment plant operation and equipment maintenance are shared among multiple stakeholders. Plant owners are generally responsible for the maintenance of distribution infrastructure leading to end users. Engineers oversee the operation and upkeep of treatment equipment within the facility. Public regulators are tasked with monitoring water quality and ensuring that it meets safety standards for human consumption. Manufacturers, while not involved in on-site operations, are responsible for equipment quality assurance prior to deployment.

== HVAC ==
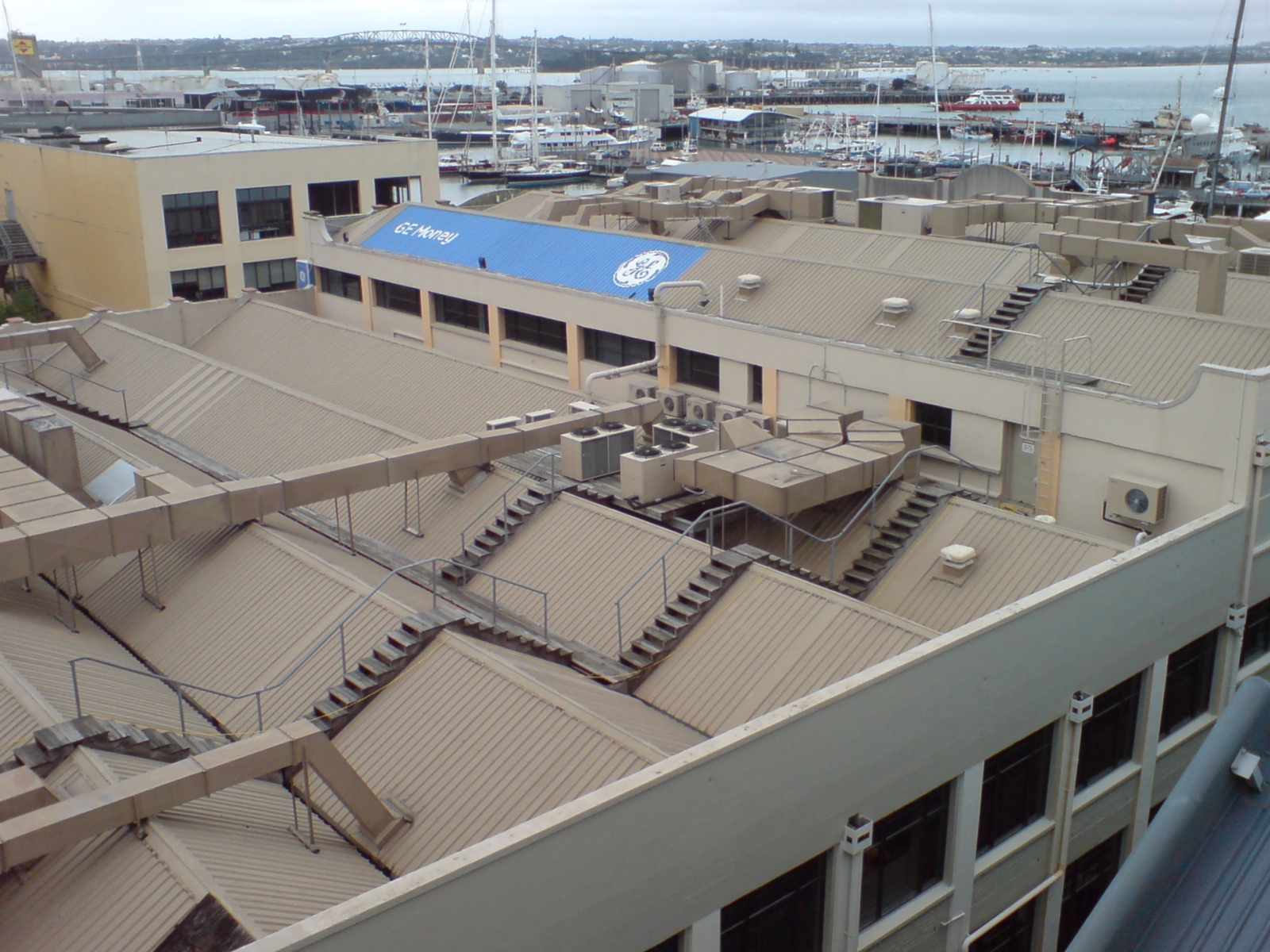
Air conditioning and exhaust plant on a rooftop in Auckland, New Zealand.

An HVAC plant typically comprises systems for heating, ventilation, and air conditioning, and may also include other mechanical systems. In some cases, it is responsible for the maintenance of additional infrastructure, such as plumbing and lighting. These systems are commonly installed in various types of facilities, including office buildings, school campuses, military bases, apartment complexes, and similar structures.

HVAC systems are designed to control and distribute heat to specific areas within a facility. Heat pumps are used to move heat in a desired direction, and may include technologies such as solar thermal and ground-source heat pumps. Other common components include finned-tube heat exchanger and fans; however, these components can be subject to efficiency losses and heat dissipation.

Ventilation systems in HVAC plants primarily function to remove airborne particles through forced air circulation, thereby contributing to indoor air quality and comfort.

== See also ==
- Activity relationship chart
- Building information modeling
- Computerized maintenance management system
- Property maintenance
- 1:5:200, an engineering rule of thumb.
- Property management
