= Planon =

Building management software

- Industry: Building management software
- Founded: 1982
- Founder: Pierre Guelen
- Headquarters: Nijmegen, Netherlands
- Key people: Peter Ankerstjerne (CEO)
- Number of employees: 1,000
- Website: planonsoftware.com

Planon is a developer and supplier of software for building management, including real estate and facilities management, such as Integrated Workplace Management System (IWMS), CMMS and CAFM systems.

Planon is based in Nijmegen, Netherlands. Planon’s software is used worldwide.

== History ==
Planon was founded in 1982 by Pierre Guelen and rapidly grew to become the computer-aided facility management (CAFM) software market leader in the Netherlands. In the late 1990s, Planon began to expand abroad. The software has been repeatedly rated as global market leader by analyst reports such as Verdantix, IDC MarketScape, Gartner and Frost & Sullivan.

In 2020, it was announced that the French multinational company Schneider Electric would take a minority stake in Planon. In 2024, Schneider Electric signed an agreement to increase its stake in Planon to a majority interest of 80%.

In 2023, Planon and SAP announced that they have formed a strategic partnership with Planon.

In May 2024, Peter Ankerstjerne (former Chief Strategy Officer) was named as the successor to Pierre Guelen as CEO, set to take over in June 2024, following the founder's 42-year tenure.
