= Property maintenance =

Upkeep of a home, apartment, rental property or building

Property maintenance relates to the upkeep of a home, apartment, rental property or building and may be a commercial venture through a property maintenance company, an employee of the company which owns a home, apartment or a self-storage pastime for example day-to-day housekeeping or cleaning.

== See also ==
- Facility management
- Activity relationship chart
- Building information modeling
- Computerized maintenance management system
- Physical plant
- 1:5:200
- Home repair
