= ECOCITIES (software) =

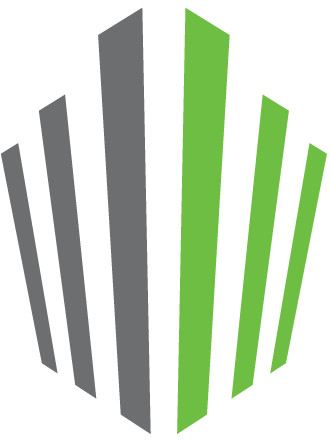
- Developer(s): XYLEM Technologies
- Initial release: December 30, 2015; 9 years ago
- Written in: Java
- Operating system: Web browser
- Platform: Cross-platform
- Available in: English, German, Others
- Type: Simulation software, Energy and facility management software, Energy management software
- License: Proprietary
- Website: www.ecocities.at

ECOCITIES is an energy optimization system for building portfolios combining and extending the benefits of Energy Management Software (EMS), Computer-aided Facility Management (CAFM) software and building portfolio management software. It integrates building administration and monitoring, energy accounting and building portfolio optimization. Thereby, it supports the definition of low carbon action plans in terms of environmental impact (e.g., carbon footprint, energy efficiency) and financial impact (e.g., investment costs, running, costs).

== Software System ==
The system considers the following options for each building and the resulting (inter-) dependencies:

- energy-efficient building configurations (e.g., the compatibility of building components and its contribution to the energy efficiency level),
- energy used at the production and distribution of building components (i.e., gray energy),
- environmental impact (e.g., CO_{2} emissions),
- financial constraints, such as (governmental) funding and limited long-term loans,
- legal constraints, e.g., building codes, national and international standards,
- energy consumption for the operation of buildings, i.e., heating, ventilation, and air conditioning (HVAC) as well as the electricity demand,
- energy production, storage and load shifting between buildings in combination with renewable energy production (solar PV and thermal, Micro combined heat and power) and conversion.
- energy flows between a building's on-site networks (Heating/Cooling and low voltage networks), the micro networks on neighborhood level and the city-wide energy networks (district heating and district cooling networks, mid-voltage distribution networks),
- local typology (position of buildings, energy networks).

ECOCITIES calculates all energy- and cost-efficient development scenarios, visualizes them on the screen and allows decision makers to interactively explore the consequences of their actions (e.g., what are the citywide costs and the corresponding CO_{2} reductions of introducing a neighborhood-scale combined heat and power plant). ECOCITIES is an enabler for the realization of energy goals and provides synergies with existing endeavors of achieving national and European energy goals. On an operational level, ECOCITIES supports the following processes:

- Administration and integrated optimization of the entire building portfolio.
- Energy accounting and monitoring for all buildings.
- Identification, evaluation and definition of energy efficiency strategies (low carbon action plans).
- Continuous monitoring, review and optimization of energy efficiency strategies (low carbon action plans).
- Ensure the alignment of individual initiatives with the overall energy strategy of the company/city, e.g., planning the cost- and energy efficient integration of new or refurbished single buildings, groups of buildings or entire neighborhoods into a new or existing energy efficiency strategy.
- Continuous monitoring of the performance related to the contribution to national and European energy goals.

== European Union ==
All member states of the European Union are bound to decrease their greenhouse gas emissions. For example, the EU climate and energy package requires member states to improve their energy efficiency by 20%, increase -renewable energy production by 20% and reduce their emissions by 20%. With about 40% of CO_{2} emissions heating, cooling and hot water production in buildings is one of the largest greenhouse gas producers. At the same time the building sector has the largest potential for energy savings. In their effort to lead a change towards greater energy efficiency and a reduction of greenhouse gas, many companies, cities and municipalities are in the process of developing low carbon action plans. However, the costs for developing optimal action plans and their continuous monitoring and optimization are very high, thus, often hindered by the tense financial situation, especially of cities and municipalities. With significant economic and environmental downsides; the consequences are additional costs due to the non-compliance to the national and EU emission goals and untapped energy saving potential.

== See also ==
- Computer-aided facility management
- Ecocities
- Efficient energy use
- Energy and facility management software
- Energy audit
- Energy conservation measures
- Energy Efficiency Implementation
- Energy management software
- Renewable energy
- Renewable heat
- Sustainable city
