= LinkCycle =

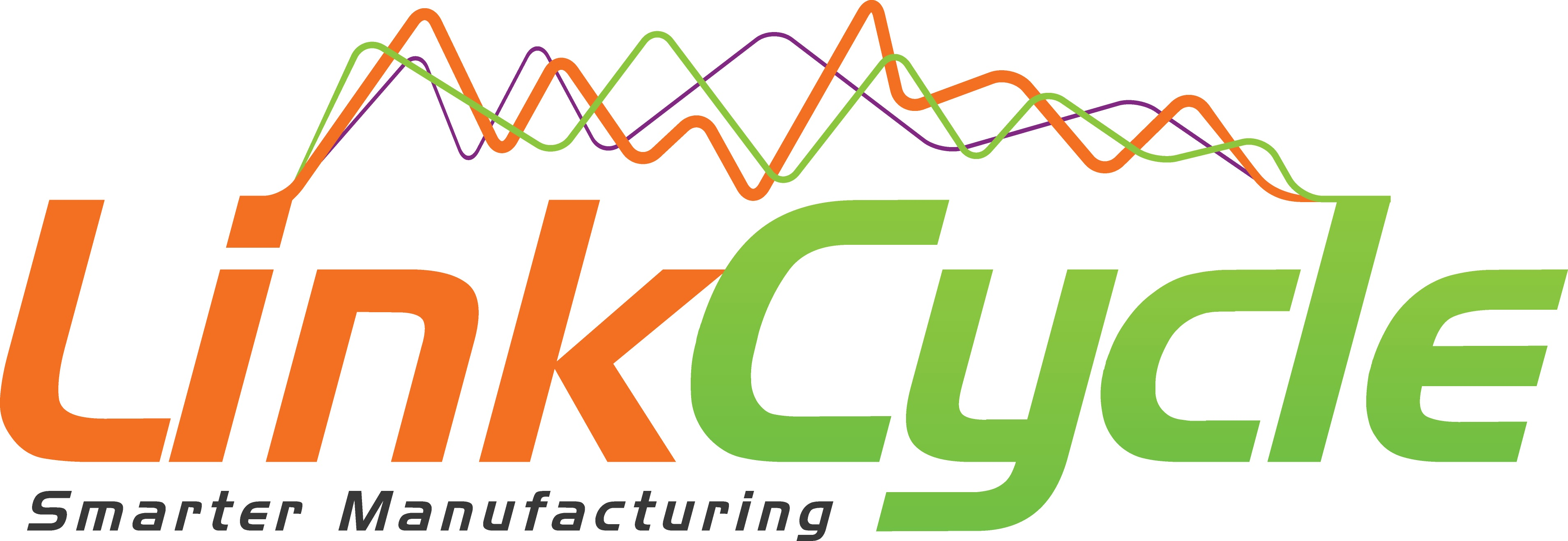
- Formation: 2010; 16 years ago
- Founder: Alex Loijos; Bradley McLean
- Type: Private
- Purpose: Energy management software, Environmental resources management, Data science
- Headquarters: Cambridge, Massachusetts
- Region served: Worldwide
- Website: https://www.linkcycle.com/

LinkCycle is an American technology company that offers energy management software to manufacturing companies. LinkCycle uses data analysis techniques on available data streams to determine the energy usage for the production lines and machinery in a manufacturing facility. This "virtual audit" technique is a substitute for current time-consuming, manual techniques that give energy managers visibility into significant energy uses: (1) electricity meter devices and (2) energy audits. In 2013, LinkCycle participated in the Boston chapter of TechStars, a startup accelerator, and has been recognized by several publications for its potential to make energy management affordable and expedient for large manufacturers.

LinkCycle is currently based in Boston, Massachusetts, United States.

== Awards and endorsements ==
Prior to TechStars, the company received initial seed funding for its performance in three business plan competitions sponsored by MIT:

- 2011 LinkedData Prize, MIT 100k Entrepreneurship Competition (co-winner with two other companies)
- 2011 Deployment Category Winner, MIT Clean Energy Prize
- 2011 MIT Global Challenge Development Grant, MIT Global Challenge

The company has received endorsement from Tim Berners-Lee, who judged the 2011 LinkedData Prize competition and is a leading advocate of linked data applications. The U.S. Department of Energy, which sponsored the MIT Clean Energy Prize, said the start-up displayed a “combination of technical prowess and passion for problem-solving.”
