= AHV =

AHV may refer to:

- Aboriginal Housing Victoria, Australia
- Afrikaansche Handelsvereeniging, a 19th century Dutch trading company
- Old-age and survivors insurance in Switzerland
- Old-age and survivors insurance in Liechtenstein
- Ash Vale railway station, UK (National Rail code AHV)
