= Minimum maintenance requirement =

Minimum maintenance requirement may refer to:

- Design of a building to minimise the requirement for maintenance through facility management
- The minimum amount of financial collateral required: see Margin (finance)
