= Energi Mine =

- Company type: Private Corporation
- Industry: Blockchain
- Founded: 2016; 10 years ago
- Headquarters: Ashton-under-Lyne, England
- Area served: Worldwide
- Key people: Omar Rahim (Founder, CEO)
- Website: energimine.com

Energi Mine is a United Kingdom based blockchain technology company, that develops products in the energy management sector. It uses deep learning artificial intelligence models to trade and manage energy. In February 2018, Energi Mine completed an initial coin offering (ICO).

Energi Mine has a blockchain-driven platform that decentralizes the global energy market by incentivizing energy conservation. Consumers and organisations are issued with ETK Tokens to reward energy efficient behavior. The tokens can be used to pay electricity bills, buy energy-efficient appliances and take public transport.

The company was founded in 2016 by Omar Rahim, who serves as its CEO. Energi Mine was covered in the news when it appointed an AI robot, Sasha to its management board to make algorithmic decisions.
