= Quagliotti =

Quagliotti is a surname. Notable people with the surname include:

- Matías Quagliotti (born 1985), Uruguayan footballer
- Winnie Quagliotti (1931–1988), Wurundjeri community leader
