= 1:5:200 =

Principle/rule of thumb in construction

In the construction industry, the 1:5:200 rule (or 1:5:200 ratio) is a rule of thumb that states that:

If the initial construction costs of a building is 1, then its maintenance and operating costs over the years is 5, and the business operating costs (salary of people working in that building) is 200.

== Rule ==
The rule originated in a Royal Academy of Engineering paper by Evans et al.

Sometimes the ratios are given as 1:10:200. The figures are averages and broad generalizations, since construction costs will vary with land costs, building type, and location, and staffing costs will vary with business sector and local economy. The RAE paper started a number of arguments about the basis for the figures: whether they were credible: whether they should be discounted; what is included in each category. These arguments overshadow the principal message of the paper that concentration on first capital cost is not optimising use value: support to the occupier and containment of operating-cost. Study by the Constructing Excellence Be Valuable Task Group, chaired by Richard Saxon, came to the view that there is merit in knowing more about key cost ratios as benchmarks and that we can expect wide variation between building types and even individual examples of the same type.

Hughes et al, of the University of Reading School of Construction Management and Engineering, observed that the "Evans ratio" is merely a passing remark in the paper's introduction (talking of "commercial office buildings" and stating that "similar ratios might well apply in other types of building") forming part of a pitch that the proportion of a company's expenditure on a building that is spent directly on the building itself (rather than upon staffing it) is around 3%, and that no data are given to support the ratio and no defence of it is given in the remainder of the paper. In attempting to determine this ratio afresh, from published data on real buildings, they found it impossible to reproduce the 1:5:200 ratio, in part because the data and methodology employed by Evans et al. were not published and in part because the definitions employed in the original paper could not be applied. The ratios that they determined were different by an order of magnitude from the 1:5:200 ratio, being approximately 1:0.4:12. They observed that "everyone else who deals with real numbers" pitches the percentage somewhere between 10% and 30%, and that their data support 12%.

They note (as does Clements-Croome) that the three costs for every individual building are affected by a plethora of factors, yielding a wide variation in ratios. They suggest that "[p]erhaps the original 1:5:200 ratio was simply meant to be a statement to focus clients' attention" on the importance of considering the higher staffing costs of a building relative to its operating and construction costs, and to encourage people to not be too concerned with higher initial build costs to improve build quality and reduce later lifetime costs. They state that if this is so "then subsequent users of the ratio have misused it", and that the frequency of use of the ratio is not problematic, but that the authority and gravitas that are assigned to it is. They conclude that "perhaps the most worrying feature of this whole discussion is how this passing introductory remark in the paper by Evans et al has gained the status of a finding from research carried out by the Royal Academy of Engineering, which it most certainly is not!".

In a paper "Re-examining the costs and value ratios of owning and occupying buildings", Graham Ive notes how widely the 1:5:200 ratio has been cited among policy makers and practitioners, and goes on to use published data about whole-life economic costs and the total costs of occupancy to re-assess the ratios. The paper finds that 1:5:200 is both an exaggeration and an over simplification. It reports that the assumed costs in the original paper are unrepresentative, identifies flaws in the original definition of terms and method, offers 'economic cost' estimates for Central London offices, extends the approach to include measurement of value added, and finally discusses the problems of measurement that need to be overcome to produce realistic ratios. It notes a key error in the original ratio is that all costs are summed regardless of when they arise, whereas from an economic perspective future costs and values need to be discounted to their equivalent present cost or value. It shows the implications of introducing discounting. The paper concludes that the best available data suggests a 1:3 undiscounted ratio for Central London offices (for construction:maintenance) and a 1:1.5 ratio when cash flows are discounted at 7%. As for the 200 operation figure, the paper concludes that a representative ratio would be of the order of 1:30 or 1:15 when cash flows are discounted at 7%.

== See also ==
- Facility management
- Activity relationship chart
- Physical plant
- Building information modeling
- Computerized maintenance management system
- Property maintenance
- Property management
