= Ecocities (disambiguation) =

Ecocities may refer to:

== Science and technology ==
- Ecocities, a city designed with consideration of environmental impact.
- Eco-cities, an eco-city is a city built off the principles of living within the means of the environment.

== Software ==
- ECOCITIES (software), an energy optimization software
