= Hems =

Hems may refer to:

- HEMS, HEMS Onsite Tai Chi Qigong Classes
- Air Ambulance – HEMS: Helicopter Emergency Medical Service
- EMS – HEMS: Home Energy Management Systems

== See also ==
- Hem
