= ClearVUE.Zero =

Energy management software platform

ClearVUE.Zero is an energy management software platform developed by ClearVUE.Business, a technology and consulting subsidiary of Global Procurement Group, founded in 2017. The platform is used to monitor business energy consumption and greenhouse gas emissions, and is applied in corporate sustainability reporting and net zero strategies.

== Features ==
The platform combines energy monitoring with carbon accounting functions. Its main features include:

- Real-time monitoring of electricity, gas, and water
- Virtual metering across multiple sites and circuits
- Dashboards for exploring and analysing historical data
- Automated reporting for compliance with energy and emissions regulations (e.g. SECR, EED, ESOS)
- Alerts when consumption, cost, or emissions exceed set limits
- Identification of time-of-use charges and potential cost-saving opportunities (e.g. reducing UK DUoS charges by shifting consumption across red, amber, and green bands).

== Adoption ==
- In 2022, Malta's Public Abattoir adopted the platform to monitor electricity use and greenhouse gas emissions and Watford F.C. also implemented it as part of its net zero programme.
- In 2023, Capital Reinforcing, a UK-based steel company, adopted the system to improve energy efficiency. SureScreen Diagnostics reported savings of about 33,300 kWh of electricity and 6.9 tonnes of CO₂e after introducing the platform across its operations. In the same year, ThyssenKrupp Materials UK announced plans to deploy ClearVUE.Zero across five sites to measure Scope 1 and Scope 2 emissions in support of its 2030 carbon neutrality target.
- In early 2024, Carnoustie Golf Links partnered with ClearVUE.Business to reduce emissions and improve energy efficiency.
- Other notable adopters include the Morgan Motor Company, which used ClearVUE.Zero to measure energy usage in its painting process and Yorkshire Wildlife Park, which introduced the system to monitor energy use across its facilities, including new animal enclosures.

== Awards and recognition ==
- In 2022, Global Procurement Group, the parent company of ClearVUE.Business, received the Third Party Intermediary (Consultancy) – 50+ award at The Energy Awards, recognising its work in supporting customers to achieve net zero.
- In 2023, ClearVUE.Business was named among the Top 18 Techpreneurs in the Energy category at the Innovation World Cup® held at Hannover Messe.
- The company was shortlisted for the Consultancy of the Year category at the 2024 edie Net Zero Awards.
- In 2024, ClearVUE.Business's CEO was named Sustainability Entrepreneur of the Year for the North East, Yorkshire and The Humber region at the Great British Entrepreneur Awards.
- In 2025, ClearVUE.Zero won the Energy Efficient Technology of the Year award at the Clean Energy Awards UK.
- In 2025, ClearVUE.Zero was named a finalist for Product of the Year (Apps & Digital Platforms) at the edie Net Zero Awards.

== Memberships ==
- In February 2025, the Chamber of Engineers (Malta) visited ClearVUE.Business as part of its industry outreach programme, reflecting the company’s engagement with professional engineering bodies.
- In 2025, ClearVUE.Business became a member of the Society of Motor Manufacturers & Traders, one of the UK's leading trade associations for automotive and allied industries.
- ClearVUE.Business is also a member of the Carbon Accounting Alliance, an international network of organisations focused on advancing best practices in carbon measurement and reporting, as well as the Sustainable Ports Association, which focuses on sustainability in ports and supply chains.

== See also ==
- Energy management software
- Energy management system
- Carbon accounting
