= KLG Systel =

Indian software development company

- Company type: Public
- Traded as: BSE: 531269; NSE: KLGSYSTEL
- Industry: Computer Software
- Founder: KL Goel
- Headquarters: Gurgaon, Haryana, India
- Area served: Worldwide
- Website: www.klgsystel.com

KLG Systel (BSE: 531269) was a software development company based in Gurgaon, India. It was listed on the National Stock Exchange of India with symbol KLGSYSTEL, and specialises in providing consulting, software, support, training and electronic commerce solutions to companies in the process, manufacturing and infrastructure industries.

In 2017, it launched an energy management system platform under its brand ConnectGaia which allows power consumers to measure, visualise, analyse and control remote systems such as water pumps in the field, in real-time.
