= Computer-aided facility management =

Computer-aided facility management (CAFM) is the support of facility management by information technology. The supply of information about the facilities is the center of attention. The tools of the CAFM are called CAFM software, CAFM applications or CAFM systems. CAFM is often used interchangeably with CMMS since both categories of software practically fulfill the same purposes.

== History ==
The International Facility Management Association (IFMA) defines facility management as the practice of coordinating the physical workplace with the people and work of the organization. It integrates principles from business administration, architecture, as well as the behavioral and engineering sciences. As such, facility management has been practiced—whether specifically identified as its own discipline or not—since the inception of business organizations. Over the years, it has evolved into a clearly defined field of expertise through the development and codification of processes.

== See also ==
- 1:5:200
- Building information modeling (BIM)
- Computerized maintenance management system (CMMS)
- Integrated workplace management system (IWMS)
- Property management system
