= Energy management software =

Category of energy-related software

Energy Management Software (EMS) is a general term and category referring to a variety of energy-related software applications, which provide energy management including utility bill tracking, real-time energy metering, consumption control (building HVAC and lighting control systems), generation control (solar PV and ESS), building simulation and modeling, carbon and sustainability reporting, IT equipment management, grid services (demand response, virtual power plant, etc.), and/or energy audits. Managing energy can require a system of systems approach.

Energy management software often provides tools for reducing energy costs and consumption for buildings, communities or industries. By analyzing data from solar monitoring systems, companies gain a precise picture of both energy production and system performance. This makes it possible to measure savings potential and offers a clear snapshot of the installation's financial health. EMS collects energy data and uses it for three main purposes: Reporting, Monitoring and Engagement. Reporting may include verification of energy data, benchmarking, and setting high-level energy use reduction targets. Monitoring may include trend analysis and tracking energy consumption to identify cost-saving opportunities. Engagement can mean real-time responses (automated or manual), or the initiation of a dialogue between occupants and building managers to promote energy conservation. One engagement method that has recently gained popularity is the real-time energy consumption display available in web applications or an onsite energy dashboard/display.

== Metering and data collection ==
Energy Management Software collects historic and/or real-time interval data, with intervals varying from quarterly billing statements to minute-by-minute smart meter readings. In addition to energy consumption, an EMS collects data related to variables that impact energy consumption such as number of people in the building, outside temperature, number of produced units, and more. The data are collected from interval meters, a building automation system, directly from utilities, directly from sensors on electrical circuits, or other sources. Past bills can be used to provide a comparison between pre- and post-EMS energy consumption.

== Data analytics ==
Through Energy Data Analytics, EMS assists the users in the composition of mathematical formulas for analyzing, forecasting and tracking energy conservation measures to quantify the success of the measure, once implemented. Energy analytics help energy managers combine across energy and non-energy data to create key performance indicators, calculate carbon footprint, greenhouse gas, renewable heat incentives and energy efficiency certifications to meet local climate change policies, directives, regulation and certifications. Energy analytics also include intelligent algorithms such as classification and machine learning to analyse the energy consumption of buildings and/or its equipment that build up a memory of energy use patterns, learn the good and bad energy consumption behaviours and notify in case of abnormal energy use.

== Reporting ==
Reporting tools are targeted at owners and executives who want to automate energy and emissions auditing. Cost and consumption data from a number of buildings can be aggregated or compared with the software, saving time relative to manual reporting. EMS offers more detailed energy information than utility billing can provide; another advantage is that outside factors affecting energy use, such as weather condition or building occupancy, can be accounted for as part of the reporting process. This information can be used to prioritize energy savings initiatives and balance energy savings against energy-related capital expenditures.

Bill verification can be used to compare metered consumption against billed consumption. Bill analysis can also demonstrate the impact of different energy costs, for example by comparing electrical demand charges to consumption costs.

Greenhouse gas (GHG) accounting can calculate direct or indirect GHG emissions, which may be used for internal reporting or enterprise carbon accounting.

== Monitoring ==
Monitoring tools track and display real-time and historical data. Often, EMS includes various benchmarking tools, such as energy consumption per square foot, weather normalization or more advanced analysis using energy modelling algorithms to identify anomalous consumption. Seeing exactly when energy is used, combined with anomaly recognition, can allow Facility or Energy Managers to identify savings opportunities.

Initiatives such as demand shaving, replacement of malfunctioning equipment, retrofits of inefficient equipment, and removal of unnecessary loads can be discovered and coordinated using the EMS. For example, an unexpected energy spike at a specific time each day may indicate an improperly set or malfunctioning timer. These tools can also be used for Energy Monitoring and Targeting. EMS uses models to correct for variable factors such as weather when performing historical comparisons to verify the effect of conservation and efficiency initiatives.

EMS may offer alerts, via text or email messages, when consumption values exceed pre-defined thresholds based on consumption or cost. These thresholds may be set at absolute levels, or use an energy model to determine when consumption is abnormally high or low. More recently, smartphones and tablets are becoming mainstream platforms for EMS.

== Automated and manual engagement ==
Engagement can refer to automated or manual responses to collected and analyzed energy data. Building control systems can respond as readily to energy fluctuation as a heating system can respond to temperature variation. Demand spikes can trigger equipment power-down processes, with or without human intervention.. Furthermore, modern energy management platforms are evolving to include integrated action management systems that bridge the gap between identifying a data anomaly and executing a physical fix. By formalizing accountability through structured workflows, these ecosystems improve engagement at the "action ownership" level, ensuring that data-driven insights lead to verified energy savings.

Another objective of Engagement is to connect occupants’ daily choices with building energy consumption. By displaying real-time consumption information, occupants see the immediate impact of their actions. The software can be used to promote energy conservation initiatives, offer advice to the occupants, or provide a forum for feedback on sustainability initiatives.

People-driven energy conservation programs, such as those sponsored by Energy Education, can be highly effective in reducing energy use and cost.

Letting occupants know their real-time consumption alone can be responsible for a 7% reduction in energy consumption.

== See also ==
- Building automation
- Energy & Facility Management Software
- Energy Management System
- Energy monitoring and targeting
- Energy saving
- ClearVUE.Zero
- EnergyCAP
- Google PowerMeter
- PSI Software
- RETScreen
