= Winnie Quagliotti =

Aboriginal Wurundjeri community leader

Winnifred Evelyn Quagliotti (née Terrick; traditional name Narrandjeri, known as Auntie Winnie; 1931 – 4 August 1988) was a Wurundjeri community leader. She was the great-great-niece of the Australian Aboriginal leader William Barak.

== Early life ==
Quagliotti was born in 1931 on the Murray River between Koondrook, Victoria, and Barham, New South Wales. Her father, William Terrick, was a truck driver and shearer, and her mother was Jessie née Wandin. They had grown up at the Coranderrk, an Aboriginal Reserve near Healesville, before being moved to Lake Tyers Mission. Quagliotti was one of ten children, and grew up in the Healesville area, and in the Melbourne suburb of Collingwood. She married Paul Quagliotti, from Trieste, Italy. She had two children of her own, and fostered others.

== Community leader ==
In 1968, Quagliotti and her husband moved to Doveton, Victoria, in the district of Dandenong. She felt that her children were old enough, and began working for the Aboriginal community. In 1970, with her brother Johnny Terrick and Walda Blow, she co-founded the organisation which in 1975 became the Dandenong & District Aborigines Co-operative Ltd. Quagliotti served as its first chairperson for thirteen years, until her death. She was chairperson of a housing co-operative which helped to provide Aborigines with housing loans, and was one of the founding members of the Aboriginal Housing Board of Victoria (now Aboriginal Housing Victoria), serving as its chairperson in 1987–1988. In that role, in 1987, she received the title deeds to the head office of the organisation, the first time an Aboriginal organisation had owned property in Victoria since Quagliotti's great-great-uncle William Barak had witnessed Wurundjeri elders signing Batman's Treaty in 1835, to sell their land to a white man.

Quagliotti worked at two Aboriginal Hostels Limited properties (Gunai Lodge and W. T. Onus Hostel) as a cook, cleaner and manager; worked to set up the Burrai Child Care Centre, which also provided family support; and helped establish an Aboriginal Family Aid Support Unit. Quagliotti also served on the council of a secondary school for Aboriginal students at Healesville, Worawa Aboriginal College, including as vice-president; and was involved with Camp Jungai, a camp for Aboriginal children near Eildon, as a member and chair of the board. She is quoted as saying, "I'm so proud to look at the little kids I nursed and see them in Aboriginal politics."

She is also remembered for her protest against the tall ships at Melbourne during the Australian Bicentenary. Wearing a possum-skin cloak with emu feathers around the neck, and with ash smeared on her face as a sign of mourning, she threw a wreath of wattle flowers into the water at Princes Pier.

In August 1988, she met with the federal Minister for Aboriginal Affairs, Gerry Hand, about Aboriginal land issues in Victoria, including the ownership of Coranderrk Cemetery, Healesville. Shortly afterwards, she suffered a cerebral haemorrhage, and died in Heidelberg. She was buried several metres outside Coranderrk Cemetery. Her family's request to bury her inside the cemetery was refused by the cemetery management committee, on the grounds that the historic graves might be disturbed. As a compromise, it was proposed to extend the cemetery boundaries to include the location of Quagliotti's grave, and a nearby road was blocked in anticipation of the extension. Six months after her burial, the block was removed and allegedly dumped on Quagliotti's grave. Ownership of the Coranderrk Cemetery was finally passed to the Wurundjeri in September 1991.

On Quagliotti's headstone are the words: "You know that I have some beautiful dreams. I urge you to start work on them as soon as possible. Pull yourselves together, stick together and get the job done."

== Recognition ==
Places in Victoria which were named in honour of Quagliotti after her death include the Burrai Child Care Centre (renamed); Narrandjeri House, the headquarters of Aboriginal Housing Victoria; and a conference room at Camp Jungai, called "Aunty Winnie's meeting place". A street in the Canberra suburb of Bonner was named "Quagliotti Street" after her in 2010.
