= EnergyCAP =

American energy management software company

EnergyCAP, LLC
- Type: Private
- Industry: Software
- Predecessor: OmniComp, Inc.; Good Steward Software
- Founded: 1980
- Founder: Steven D. Heinz
- Headquarters: Boalsburg, Pennsylvania, United States
- Area served: Worldwide
- Key people: Shawn Lankton (CEO)
- Products: EnergyCAP Utility Management, Watts AI, Emissions, Interval Data, Bill Operations
- Owner: LLR Partners, Resurgens Technology Partners
- Website: energycap.com

EnergyCAP, LLC is a software company that develops utility and energy management software. Its software as a service (SaaS) platform consolidates utility bill, meter, interval, and emissions data into a single audited system used by energy, facilities, finance, accounts payable, and sustainability teams. The company was founded in 1982 and is headquartered in Boalsburg, Pennsylvania, with an additional office in Dublin, Ireland.

== History ==
EnergyCAP’s was founded in 1980 due to a growing demand for energy management software. PCs were in their infancy when Steven D. Heinz founded OmniComp, Inc. in 1980 and launched the development of EnergyCAP predecessor FASER Energy Accounting.

Steve Heinz, founder

FASER became widely used by retail chains, government, universities, school districts and property managers. By the mid-1990s, FASER's thousands of users tracked an estimated five million bills a year valued at $2 billion. FASER and OmniComp were purchased by Enron Corporation in 1996. Following Enron's bankruptcy in late 2001, Heinz acquired the energy information assets and launched Good Steward Software, which was renamed to EnergyCAP, Inc. in January 2010. In 2013, Heinz was named International Energy Engineer of the Year by the Association of Energy Engineers. The company was renamed EnergyCAP, LLC in March 2021 upon the establishment of a strategic partnership with private equity investment firm Resurgens Technology Partners.

The company has used machine learning within its software for decades to forecast expected utility bill behavior and flag billing anomalies. In 2026, it introduced EnergyCAP Watts AI, an artificial intelligence engine integrated across the platform, along with Watts chat, which lets users ask natural language questions about their own utility data. The Watts AI name is a registered trademark in the United Kingdom, with applications pending in the United States and Canada.

In September 2026, at its annual customer conference, Catalyst, EnergyCAP announced Insights, a package that adds self-service reporting, automated alerts, and a dashboard that ranks audit flags and data anomalies.

In September 2026, EnergyCAP received a strategic investment from LLR Partners, and Resurgens Technology Partners remained an active investor alongside LLR.

== Acquisitions ==
In August 2022, EnergyCAP acquired Wattics, an energy management analytics and monitoring software company based in Dublin. Wattics became the company’s Smart Analytics product, now the Interval Data module.

== Platform and capabilities ==
The EnergyCAP platform integrates utility, commodity, meter, and sensor data into a single system of record. The core platform, EnergyCAP Utility Management, automates utility bill ingestion, audits bills for errors, and provides analytics for energy, facilities, sustainability, and finance teams. Bills enter the platform through manual entry, import files, or Bill Capture; after audit and approval, they feed reports, dashboards, and ENERGY STAR Portfolio Manager submittals, and export to accounting systems or payment processors. EnergyCAP Watts AI, the company's artificial intelligence engine, is integrated across the platform.

Optional software modules include:

- Emissions (formerly Carbon Hub): Translates energy and meter data into Scope 1, 2, and 3 emissions equivalents, linking greenhouse gas (GHG) reporting directly to utility costs.
- Interval Data (formerly Smart Analytics): Analyzes interval and submeter data at intervals as short as five minutes to identify billing errors, detect usage issues before they appear on utility bills, and support measurement and verification.
- Advanced Accounting: Includes Budgets, AP GL Export, and Accruals.
- Chargebacks: Splits a single vendor bill into internal bills by department, facility, or tenant using static percentages, floor area, or actual use, and creates bills from submeter calculations.

The company also offers managed services under the name Bill Operations. These services pair automated processing with review and payment by utility data specialists, who handle the exceptions via flags within EnergyCAP UtilityManagement.

- Bill Capture: Processes utility bill data entry and resolution, including Web Capture for retrieving bills directly from utility vendor portals.
- Bill Retrieval: Retrieves bills directly from supported utility vendors on the customer's behalf.
- Bill Review: Audits and resolves bill flags and processing issues before they affect the customer's data, and escalates errors, gaps, and anomalies with the context needed to act.
- Bill Pay: Pays utility bills on the customer's behalf once they are captured, audited, and approved, applying the customer's configured business rules and multilevel approval workflows. Payments go out electronically or as digitally generated checks through a network of payment partners.

== Customer base ==
EnergyCAP serves more than 750 organizations globally in higher education, government, school districts, healthcare, commercial real estate, retail, and manufacturing, which together track more than $100 billion in utility bill value annually. In its State of Utilities report, published in January 2026, the company found that one in five utility bills processed on its platform contained an error.

In a July 2026 Value of EnergyCAP survey of 130 respondents across 100 organizations, respondents said EnergyCAP improves visibility into utility spending. Of those surveyed, 98% said the software improves confidence in the accuracy of their data, 95% said it reduces risk, and 92% said it saves time on bill processing. In addition, 88% reported finding billing errors or savings.

Among respondents who reported savings from billing errors and other issues, the average annual savings equaled 3% of total utility costs. Respondents who implemented energy conservation measures (ECMs) found savings averaged 5% of annual utility spend.

Respondents also reported saving more than three times the value they pay for the software. The company reports that customers save an average of 8% on total utility spend after implementing EnergyCAP.

Separately, project data logged in the platform shows that over the past decade, customers have recorded about 7,500 ECMs, averaging more than $250,000 in savings per project.

== Community ==
EnergyCAP hosts Eco Champions, an online community open to anyone in energy and utility management. Members ask questions, share what’s working, and learn from each other and from EnergyCAP experts.

== Recognition and evolution ==
EnergyCAP has received multiple industry awards, including:

- Info-Tech Research Group 2025 Emotional Footprint Awards for Environmental, Social, and Governance (ESG) Reporting Software Champion
- ENERGY STAR Partner of the Year 2024
- Capterra Best of Energy Management 2024
- Green Quadrant: Energy Management Software 2023
- Software Reviews 2024 Top Environmental, Social and Governance Reporting (ESG) Software Quadrant
- Summer 2024 Energy Manager Software Leaders
- Major Player in the Worldwide Carbon Accounting & Management Applications 2024 Vendor Assessment
- Software Reviews ESG Reporting Data Quadrant Leader
- 2024 Top Product of the Year by the Environment+Energy Leader Awards Program
- Top Climate Tech Companies to Watch in 2024
- Best Company Perks & Benefits 2023
- Software Reviews 2023 Emotional Footprint Champion
- Best Places to Work 2023
- Spring 2022 Energy Management Software (Wattics)
- 2015 Product of the Year, Energy Manager Today
