= Hotel energy management =

Hotel energy management is the practice of controlling procedures, operations and equipment that contribute to the energy use in a hotel operation. This includes the types of energy used (electricity, gas, water or other natural resources), as well as the types, quantities and energy efficiency ratings of energy consuming devices such as heating, cooling, elevators, cleaning and laundry. For example, a 2002 study of hotels in Hong Kong found that hotels used 73% of their energy as electricity.

Hotel energy usages are tracked and classified by the U.S. Department of Energy, including Energy Star, and statistics are regularly published in the Energy Information Administration annual reports.

== Current practices ==
Since roughly the 1990s, energy service companies typically advise hotels regarding inefficient usage of energy and optimizing its usage. Some of these consultants participate by providing the products to implement their advice for a share of the cost savings. Examples of energy-saving practices used by hotels include:

- Using Infrared motion sensors, door contacts, and other means to detect occupancy to control the heating, ventilating and air conditioning systems (HVAC) when guests forget to switch off when they leave their room.
- Turning off the lights when a room is not occupied - this is called smart lighting.
- Information cards requesting guests to save water by letting hotel housekeeping staff know if they would care to re-use towels and bed linens.
- Scheduling energy loads
