= Energy management system =

- Energy management system (building management), a computer system for the automated control and monitoring of systems in a building which yield significant energy consumption
- Energy management system (electrical grid), a system used by operators of electric utility grids to monitor, control, and optimize the performance of the generation or transmission system
