= Green logistics =

Ecological logistics

Green logistics describes all attempts to measure and minimize the ecological impact of logistics activities. This includes all activities of the forward and reverse flows of products, information and services between the point of origin and the point of consumption. It is the aim to create a sustainable company value using a balance of economic and environmental efficiency. Green logistics has its origin in the mid-1980s and was a concept to characterize logistics systems and approaches that use advanced technology and equipment to minimize environmental damage during operations.

== Demand for action ==
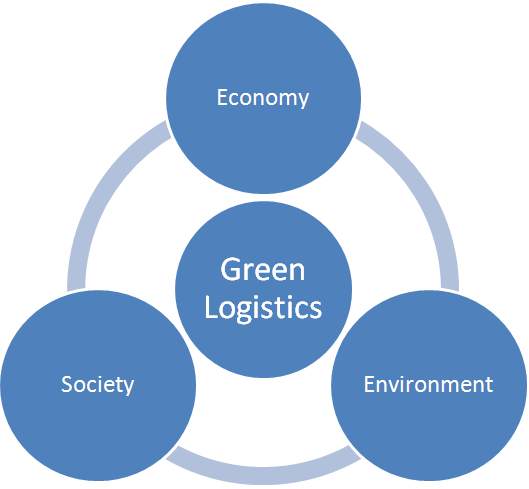
Three main sections of green logistics

Organizations have to face changes in the coming years.

In addition to increasing diversity and dynamics, environmental issues become more important. Social, political and economic demands for sustainable development force organizations to reduce the effect on the environment of their supply chains and to develop sustainable transport and supply chain strategies.

There are interactions between logistics, environment and natural resources. The approach of logistics is interdisciplinary, holistic and cross-company. Creating environmental objectives can be done in synergy with other strategic and financial goals.

== Ecological concern ==
The "ecological concern" in logistics determines how far the logistics or the supply chain of a company is faced with the issue of environmental protection and resource conservation. Basically, a supply chain is affected by various influencing factors in this context. The main influencing factors are the stakeholders of the organization and the rising costs of energy and commodity.

Some of the key stakeholders in this context are:

- The state with growing international and national regulations
- Customers and consumer with increasing awareness and demand for environmentally friendly products and (logistics) services
- Employees who want to work in an environmentally and socially responsible company
- Society with increasing claims for more corporate social responsibility (CSR)
- Companies themselves, dealing with their own motivation

There is also the pressure of lenders, investors, insurers and investors. Indications of this are new forms of investment in the capital market, such as the Dow Jones Sustainability Index, that tracks the stock performance of the world's leading companies in terms of economic, environmental and social criteria.

The dimension of ecological concern of a company is the product of these complex and varying factors.

== Approaches ==
Logistics has a whole range of measures to protect the environment and resources. Some are new, others long-known. These actions can be assigned to different levels – maturity, range, scope, capital expenditure and resource requirements.

Corresponding to the holistic approach of green logistics, logistics has five starting points to implement measures for environmental protection and resource conservation:

1. customer, market and product
2. structures and planning
3. processes, control and measurement
4. technologies and resources
5. employees, suppliers and service providers

Examples:

- More efficient packing
- Route optimization
- Load optimization
- Formation of corporate networks, which are connected by logistics service
- Optimizing physical logistics processes by providing a sophisticated IT support

The first four levels form a hierarchy and influence each other sequentially. Decisions on one level define the scope for further decisions on the following levels. Decisions at higher levels reduce the freedom for the following levels. Example: The determination of the packing mass of a product on the Level one defines the volume and weight of a product and therefore the maximum number of items per carrier (e.g., container). Thus, the decision made on level one influences the maximum capacity of a container. The effects on the environment, – measured as carbon-dioxide (CO_{2}) emissions per transported product – therefore, are strongly influenced by the decisions made on level one. Decisions made on levels two and three, such as route optimization, also affect carbon-dioxide emissions.

== Challenges ==
While many countries and companies hope to reduce the damage to the environment by evaluating their operations around logistics, companies struggle to trace and track all parts of their supply chain to note where logistics could become more green.

Many companies see tension between increased sales and increased emissions, and maximizing profit does not coincide with environmentally-friendly practices.

In addition, the cost of green logistics can be high. For example, ammonia is 3-7 times more expensive than traditional marine fuels.

== Solutions ==
Because retailers have many suppliers, it is difficult to calculate all carbon emissions. However, retailers will reward suppliers who work hard to reduce carbon emissions. Therefore, suppliers will work hard for these labels.

Many companies are developing plans to use green ammonia to replace the fuel used by today's cargo ships.

== See also ==
- Reverse logistics – All operations related to the reuse of products and materials
