= Aboriginal Housing Victoria =

Community housing agency for Indigenous Australians in Victoria

Aboriginal Housing Victoria (AHV) is a not-for-profit, registered community housing agency and is the largest Aboriginal housing organisation in the Australian state of Victoria. AHV was the first Aboriginal housing agency to be registered as a housing provider in Victoria and it is also the largest in Australia, and serves as an Aboriginal landlord, providing personalised, culturally sensitive services for over 4000 Aboriginal Victorians through more than 1500 tenancies.

== History ==
Until the 1951s no government housing was provided for Aboriginal people in Victoria and much of what began to be provided was inadequate, and delivered under an assimilation policy that saw the dislocation of Aboriginal people from traditional lands into accommodation that was often unfit for habitation.

More concerted efforts from the Commonwealth Government in the 1970s saw a major allocation of funds for Aboriginal housing and the establishment of Aboriginal housing organisations. However the major responsibility for Aboriginal controlled housing was transferred to the states, against the wishes of the Aboriginal housing organisations (known as cooperatives in Victoria).

The Aboriginal men and women involved in housing identified a need for a self-managed Aboriginal housing organisation, given continuing frustration with the quality of housing and treatment of Aboriginal tenants in private and social housing. By the late 1970s, the movement for an Aboriginal controlled housing organisation in Victoria had gained momentum, at a time when Aboriginal community leaders across Australia set up their own organisations to address inadequate provision of services such as housing, health, childcare, community services, education and legal services.

At the heart of this movement was the importance of gaining back control – Aboriginal owned and administered housing, and not just the provision of accommodation.

"All houses transferred to the Housing Commission from the Ministry of Aboriginal Affairs should be handed over to the Aboriginal Co-operatives for the purpose of housing Aboriginal people." – Nessie Skuta, National Aboriginal Conference representative for country Victoria, 1978.

It is clear that transfer of housing to Aboriginal organisations was seen by Victoria's Aboriginal community leaders as being about handing back the control that had been removed, about righting a previous wrong.

By 1981, the Aboriginal Housing Board of Victoria was established to oversee the management of properties owned by the Victorian Government for the provision of housing to Victorian Aboriginal people. Originating as a small community organisation representing Victorian Aboriginal communities, a partnership was formed with the Victorian Government as members advocated for the allocation of accessible and appropriate housing for Aboriginal Victorians and for the better treatment of Aboriginal tenants.

The establishment of the AHBV was the culmination of more than two decades of efforts from Victorian Aboriginal community leaders and a major achievement in taking back control and self-management of Aboriginal lives in Victoria. The founding members of the board had a vision that it would one day own the properties it managed, and this has been a driving force for the organisation.

In 2016, the Victorian Government announced it would transfer 1,522 property titles worth A$500 million to AHV over a two-year period.

== Today ==
Aboriginal Housing Victoria continues to provide culturally sensitive, Aboriginal service delivery as it works towards the goal of self-determination through Aboriginal owned title.

=== Vision ===
"Our vision is that Aboriginal Victorians are able to secure appropriate, affordable housing as a pathway to better lives and stronger communities."

=== Services ===
AHV provides housing to approximately 4,000 low income Aboriginal and Torres Strait Islander Victorians, representing at least 8% of the Victorian Aboriginal population, in 1,525 properties across metropolitan and regional Victoria. The majority of the properties are owned by the Department of Health and Human Services.

Aboriginal and Torres Strait Islander people in need of housing can make an application to AHV, and they will be placed on a waiting list until a suitable home in a preferred area becomes available. Applicants may be considered for priority housing if they are deemed to have a more urgent need than general applicants.

Tenants pay subsidised rent to AHV, who manages the properties including maintenance and repairs. AHV achieves above community housing sector standard for maintaining tenancies – 89% in 2014–15.

While provision of housing is core business, the organisation works closely with other Aboriginal service providers to support the needs of its tenants who can have unique and complex disadvantage.

The organisation believes this success is rooted in the notion that Aboriginal owned and controlled organisations are best placed to provide services for Aboriginal people, without interference or patronage from non-Aboriginal organisations or bureaucracies.

But AHV is also a multicultural organisation and sees its strength in the diversity of its people – both Indigenous and non-Indigenous – "working together with mutual respect and co-operation, expertise and knowledge" – Jim Berg, "More Bees With Honey –A History of the Aboriginal Housing Board of Victoria."

== Governance ==
Aboriginal Housing Victoria is:

- A company limited by guarantee and established under the Corporations Act 2001 (Cth);
- A registered housing agency under the Housing Act 1983 (Vic); and
- A registered charity under the Australian Charities and Not-for-profits Commission Act 2012 (Cth) and a public benevolent institution, entitled to tax concessions under the Income Tax Assessment Act 1997 (Cth)

AHV is governed by a board composed of non-executive directors. The chairperson is elected by the full board. In accordance with the AHV constitution, there are no less than 5 and no more than 7 directors on the board, and the majority must be Aboriginal.

Directors hold office for a term commencing on the date from which he or she is appointed and concluding at the expiry of the third annual general meeting of the company following appointment.

All directors must live in Victoria and a majority must be Aboriginal.

=== Key officeholders ===
As of 2020, key officeholders are:

- Chair – Tim Chatfield
- Deputy Chair – Ian Hamm
- CEO – Darren Smith

== Timeline ==
=== More Bees With Honey: A History of the Aboriginal Housing Board of Victoria 1981 – 2004 ===
1972	Federal Government federalised Aboriginal Affairs in accordance with the vote of the Australian people in the referendum of 1967
December 1974	Transfer of Functions Bill passed and State Government agencies assume responsibility for Aboriginal Affairs within their specific areas, i.e. Aboriginal Housing to Housing Commission of Victoria (State Housing Authority)
June 1978	First State Aboriginal Housing meeting held in Collingwood where decision made to establish a steering committee
1979–1980	State Aboriginal Housing Steering Committee meetings held during this time
October 1980	State Cabinet ratifies constitution of Board
February 1981	First statewide elections held for all board member positions
April 1981	Inaugural meeting of the Aboriginal Housing Board of Victoria in Melbourne
June 1981	Office established at 108 Smith Street, Collingwood
May 1982	First Policy and Procedures Document on Aboriginal Housing accepted by the Board
September 1982	First Annual General Meeting held in Northcote and first Annual Report produced and circulated
December 1982	Board's proposal on Aboriginal Housing Liaison Officers receives approval by the State
December 1982	Accommodation Standards accepted by the Board
October 1983	Board's registration as public company limited by guarantee finalised
February 1985	First Statewide Aboriginal Housing Conference held at Camp Jungai
February 1987	Board transfers to new office premises in Gertrude Street, Fitzroy
1988	Community protest about evictions
March 1988	Community meetings held after each monthly Board meeting in Mooroopna, Morwell, Dandenong, Mildura, Ballarat, Warrnambool and Melbourne
July 1988	Statewide Rental Arrears Strategy Meeting held in Echuca
November 1988	Second Statewide Housing Conference held in Mildura. Feasibility Study on Future Ownership of the Aboriginal Housing Program tabled at Conference where endorsement received
May 1989	Consultant appointed and Feasibility Study commences
July 1989	Consultant talks with communities about Future Ownership of the Aboriginal Housing Program. First Board Newsletter produced providing information about the Forward Plan
September 1989	Board adopts amendments to its constitution at AGM held in Echuca
February 1990	Feasibility Study completed

August 1990	Workshop on Feasibility Study report held in Melbourne And Forward Plan developed from results of discussion Board formally adopts Forward Pan at August 1990 meeting
April 1991	First Workshop on Implementation of Forward Plan held in Melbourne
August 1993	Board receives ownership of 4 rental properties purchased out of ATSIC funds Properties leased to the Office of Housing and managed and administered under the Victorian Aboriginal Rental Housing Program
1991–1993	Implementation of Forward Plan proceeds throughout the next three years
April 1994	Board adopts amendments to its constitution at meeting
May 1994	Second Forward Plan Workshop held in Melbourne
1994–1995	Implementation of Forward Plan continues
February 1995	Board transfers to new office premises at Scotchmer Street, North Fitzroy
July 1995	Aboriginal Housing Section, DPD transformed into Aboriginal Housing Services Unit, DPD and fee for service arrangement continues
October 1995	Workshop and consultations held to develop State Plan and Corporate Plan at Melbourne
December 1995	State Plan and Corporate Plan endorsed by Board
February 1996	Statewide Elections for board members
March 1996	First Corporate Plan Workshop at Melbourne
June 1996	First Policies and Procedures Workshop at Marysville
July 1996	Commencement of Service Agreement
September 1996	Start of statewide tour of Ellimatta Historical Photographic Exhibition
October 1997	Team Building Workshop held in Melbourne ATSIC consultancy on future housing arrangements for Victoria commences
December 1997	ATSIC Housing conference on future housing arrangements for Victoria held at Camp Jungai
February 1998	Launch of Ellimatta Historical Photographic Exhibition Catalogue Book during Housing Week Paper on Proposed Bilateral Agreement – Options for Aboriginal Housing in Victoria presented to Board meeting for discussion
May 1998	Planning Workshop held at Marysville
February 1999	Launch of Elders poster during Housing Week held in Melbourne Statewide Elections for all board member positions Board adopts amendments to its constitution at Special General Meeting held in Melbourne
July 1999	Forward Plan Strategy Workshop held at Mansfield
October 1999	Second Policies and Procedures Workshop held at Thornbury
December 1999	Consultant and Project Officer present Forward Plan 'Where We Are Now Report" to the Board
April 2000	Board celebrates 1000th property purchase in Shepparton Myrtle Muir receives Frances Pennington Aware from Minister for Housing at Parliament House, Victoria
July 2000	Strategic Plan developed Aboriginal Housing Services Unit, Department of Human Services, relocated to the Board office in North Fitzroy as first step in Strategic Plan implementation
August 2000	Board appoints first chief executive officer
February 2001	Board appoints first Property Manager and Research & Policy Manager Board commences celebration of 20th Anniversary at 20th year Board meeting
April 2001	Board holds 20th Anniversary Dinner and Presentation Evening event
May 2001	Board presented with Reconciliation Week plaque by Victorian Government in recognition of 20th Anniversary
June 2001	Board holds 3rd Strategic Plan Workshop
October 2001	Launch of board member Photographic Display in Board's conference room
May 2002	Launch of 21st Anniversary Commemorative artwork at Board office (Shelter 2, by Lyn Thorpe commissioned by City of Yarra Community Grants –"Mother Earth is our Shelter. She provides for us and nurtures our physical needs. She sustains Identity, Spirituality and Connection to Country. She is our Shelter and in 'Our Special Place' her healing spirit empowers us to be True to Ourselves, Our Families and Our Heritage." )
June 2002	Board appoints first Finance Manager Board holds 4th Strategic Plan Workshop Board receives title to the nine ex-Victorian Aboriginal Co-operative Limited Properties located in Melbourne. Board now has title to, and owns 13 rental housing properties
July 2002	First tour of Aboriginal Housing Office NSW, by Board Chairperson and staff
November 2002	Third Policy Workshop held at Aborigines Advancement League, Thornbury
December 2002	Joint Meeting between AHBV and Aboriginal Housing Office, at Albury NSW
February 2003	New version of AHBV Housing Standards printed and provided to Board meeting
March 2003	National Indigenous Homelessness Forum held in Melbourne
May 2003	Launch of Multi Cultural Events Calendar
June 2003	Board holds 5th Strategic Planning Workshop in Morwell
November 2003	Fourth Policy Workshop held at Halls Gap
June 2004	Board holds fourth Planning Workshop at Warrnambool Launch of Housing Week Calendar
August 2004	Board signs off on first Service Agreement – Tenancy which replaces previous funding agreements Memorandum of Understanding signed between the Board and the Director of Housing setting out the agreed tasks to be achieved under the Strategic Plan
November 2004	Board holds fifth Policy Workshop in Lakes Entrance

=== Appendix 1A – Additional History Timeline 2004 – ongoing ===
2005	The path to transition to ownership continues
2006	Aboriginal Affairs Victoria provided funding for office renovations and AHV history book grant
April 2006	"More History Than Bees" – AHV history book launched by the Minister for Aboriginal Affairs, The Hon. Gavin Jennings MP
2006	The Aboriginal Housing Board of Victoria formally changed its name to Aboriginal Housing Victoria and saw the adoption of a new constitution.
2006	As part of its ongoing commitment to providing safe, secure and affordable housing for indigenous Victorians, the Victorian Government allocated significant Commonwealth State Housing Agreement untied funds to the Aboriginal Rental Housing Program (ARHP), in addition to funds designated for Aboriginal Housing. Bringing the total number of properties to 1,337.
2007	Annual Report artwork was prepared by Megan Solomon, a 15-year-old student currently doing year 10 at Orbost Secondary College in East Gippsland. The painting came about through the "Big Brother Mentor Program" art class and got the idea from breaking up the words "Aboriginal Housing Victoria"
2008	State Government's "Transition to Independence" initiative provided AHV with impetus to transform our management structure to a total independent not-for-profit company
2008	New model for Corporate Governance with a focus on structuring the Board to add value to AHV, laying solid foundations for management and oversight
2008	Annual Report artwork designed by Colleen Howell, a passionate Victoria artist from the Barwon South-West region. The artwork represents the freedom of our people coming home. The background resembles the land, 'our land', the footprints resembles the people, 'our people' and the house resembles home, 'our home'.
2010	Aunty Merle Bamblett awarded the Frances Penington Award for contributions to society
2012	New Constitution for AHV developed
2012	Kate Oates, a Wiradjuri artist, was commissioned to prepare the artwork for2011/12 Annual Report – entitled "The Empowerment of our people" to depict home as a safe place, where the impossible becomes possible
2013	Kate Oates, a Wiradjuri artist, was commissioned to prepare the artwork for 2012/13 Annual Report – entitled "The Empowerment of our people" to show the continuing commitment to housing for indigenous Victorian people.
December 2013	AHV undertook a significant organisational restructure with the recruitment of a new CEO and Executive Management Group
2014	AHV Boardroom table artwork commissioned by the former CEO of Aboriginal Housing Victoria Bev Murray, design and artwork prepared by Lyn Thorpe, with the central circle representing the heart of the AHV and workforce and the sun depicting the strength and sustainability needed to enable the ongoing provision of quality housing.
July 2014	NAIDOC Week – 15 years celebration at Collingwood Children's Farm
October 2014	Board endorses AHV Communications Strategy
February 2015	Board signs off on AHV's long term Strategic Plan 2014–2025
May 2015	AHV made a submission to the Royal Commission into Family Violence
July 2015	Board approve AHV's Community Engagement Strategy Board approve the Life Skills Program, a client centred, outcome focused program to empower tenants to live independently and sustain their tenancies and identify their goals and aspirations AHV made a commitment to become a White Ribbon Accredited Workplace
August 2015	Board approve Governance Policy, Governance Committee Terms of Reference, AHV Board Charter and Board Code of Conduct
September 2015	Board signs off on AHV's long term Asset Management Plan, Asset Management Strategy and Asset Management Policy
October 2015	AHV Submission to the Department of Health & Human Services Housing Registrar to become a Housing Association
November 2015	AHV celebrates White Ribbon Day and starts participating in the 1 million stars to end violence project, with a commitment to weave 10,000 stars in Aboriginal and Torres Strait Islander flag colours
January 2016	Victorian Aboriginal Honour Roll honours Aunty Patricia (Pat) Ockwell, a former AHV Chairperson of AHV from 1996 to 2004 and strong advocate for social justice and equality, along with Aunty Georgina Lovett-Williams, a former AHV board member and Representative committee member for Northern and Eastern metro region and a tenacious campaigner for land rights and social justice; and long standing AHV tenant, Aunty Cath Solomon who has made significant contributions to the Gippsland community.
March 2016	AHV made a submission to the Victorian Government's Gender Equality Strategy
April 2016	Board approved a new Child Safe Policy Board approved amendments to the Code of Conduct for AHV staff and Board to incorporate changes to comply with new Child Safety Standards and AHV's organisational commitment to zero tolerance towards violence as part of White Ribbon Workplace Accreditation

September 2017 – In a significant step toward self-determination, the Victorian Government announces transfer of ownership of over 500 metropolitan houses to AHV, with non-metropolitan houses to be transferred in two tranches over the following two years. This realises AHV's long held aspiration to own the rental properties it manages on behalf of Government and lays the foundation for future growth.
