= International Facility Management Association =

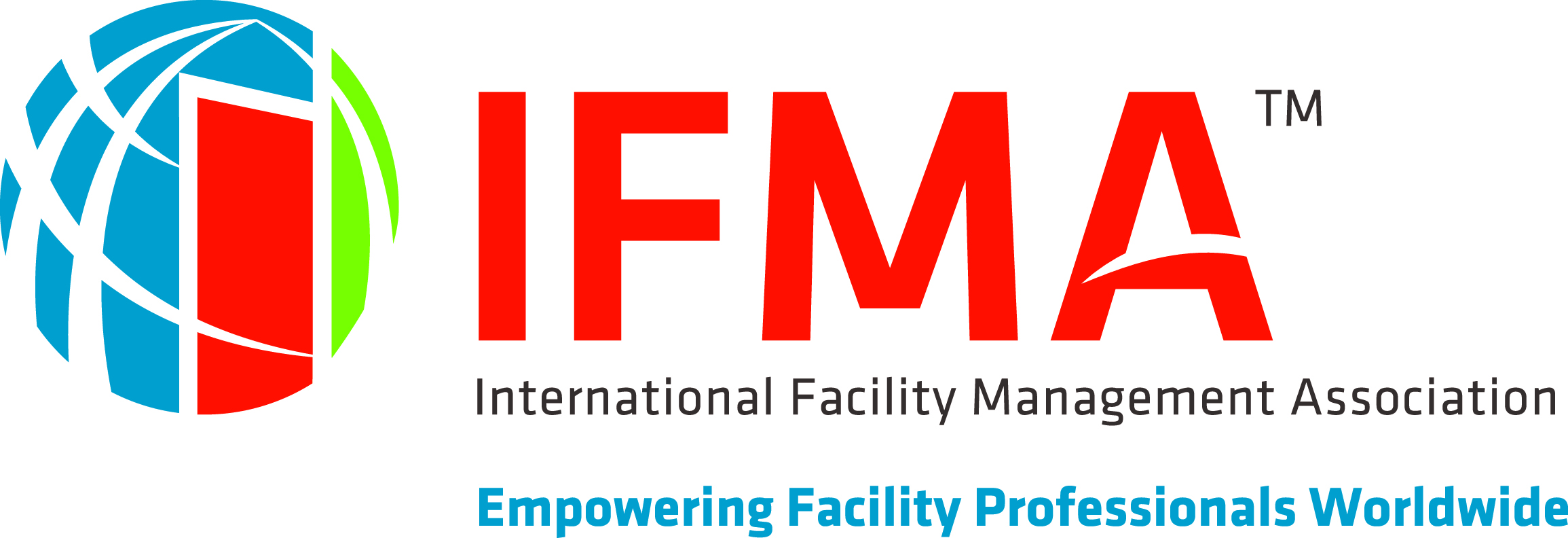
- Established: October 1980
- Type: Professional association
- Purpose: Advancing the profession and professionals of facility management.
- Headquarters: Houston, Texas, USA
- Region served: Facility management
- Members: 22,000 (as of 2022)
- Website: ifma.org

The International Facility Management Association (IFMA), originally the National Facility Management Association (NFMA), is a professional membership association for facility management professionals. IFMA's global headquarters office is located in Houston, Texas, USA. IFMA also employs staff located in Antwerp, Belgium; and Shanghai, China.

IFMA was founded in 1980 by a group of people led by David Armstrong of Michigan State University, George Graves of Texas Eastern Transmission Corp. and Charles Hitch of Manufacturer's Bank. It was originally established in Ann Arbor, Michigan as the National Facility Management Association (NFMA), a not-for-profit incorporated association. The name was changed to IFMA in 1982 due to a growing Canadian contingency. As of 2019, IFMA had 24,000 members in more than 100 countries. IFMA is also a member of the Global Facility Management Association (Global FM), a consortium of facility management associations.

== Programs and events ==
IFMA certifies facility managers, conducts research, provides educational programs, accredits facility management degree and certificate programs, and produces a series of facility management-related conferences and expositions. Its official publication, FMJ, is a bimonthly magazine written for facility professionals.

IFMA's "World Workplace" is an annual conference and exposition for professionals who support facilities. Originally held in the U.S., the event series has expanded to Europe, the Middle East, India, China and Asia.

IFMA also produces and hosts "Facility Fusion", an educational event offering FM networking and leadership training, as well as a produce and service exposition.

== IFMA Foundation ==
Established in 1990 as a nonprofit 501(c)(3) corporation, the IFMA Foundation promotes educational opportunities to advance the facility management profession and make FM a career of choice. The IFMA Foundation provides FM student resources, such as competitions, scholarships and an internship board, and works with economic development committees and academic institutions to expand FM education and awareness. The foundation's work is supported by contributions from the facility management community, including IFMA members, chapters, councils, corporate sponsors and private contributors.

== Components ==
IFMA comprises three types of networking groups, collectively called components. This includes sub-groups by region (136 local chapters), facility type or area of practice (16 industry councils) and specialization or core competency of focus (7 communities). These 7 communities are as follows:

Business Community (BIZ)	Environmental Stewardship Utilities & Sustainability Community	Information Technology Community
Military Community	Operations & Maintenance Health & Safety Community	Real Estate Advisory and Leadership Community
Workplace Evolutionaries (WE) Community

== See also ==
- Institute of Workplace and Facilities Management
- Royal Institution of Chartered Surveyors
