= Activity relationship chart =

An activity relationship chart (ARC) is a tabular means of displaying the closeness rating among all pairs of activities or departments. In an ARC there are six closeness ratings which may be assigned to each pair of departments, as well as nine reasons for those ratings (each is assigned by a reason code).

== Rating symbols ==
1. A: Absolutely necessary
2. E: Especially important
3. I: Important and core
4. O: Ordinary
5. U: Unimportant
6. X: Prohibited or Undesirable

== Reason codes ==
1. Same table
2. Flow of material
3. Service
4. Convenience
5. Inventory control
6. Communication
7. Same personnel
8. Cleanliness
9. Flow of parts

A rule of thumb is used to restrict the choice of rating letters:

- Very few A and X relationships (no more than five percent) should be assigned
- No more than 10 percent should be E
- No more than 15 percent should be I
- No more than 20 percent should be O
- About 50 percent of the relationships should be U

== Developing an ARC ==
1. List all the departments within the facility, and draw a rectangle around each one.
2. Draw a rhombus between each department, until you fully construct the rhombus as a tree.
3. Divide each rhombus into two halves; the upper half will contain the rating letter, while the lower half will contain the rating-reason code.

== See also ==
- distance matrix
- correlation matrix
