= Computerized maintenance management system =

Software to manage maintenance operations

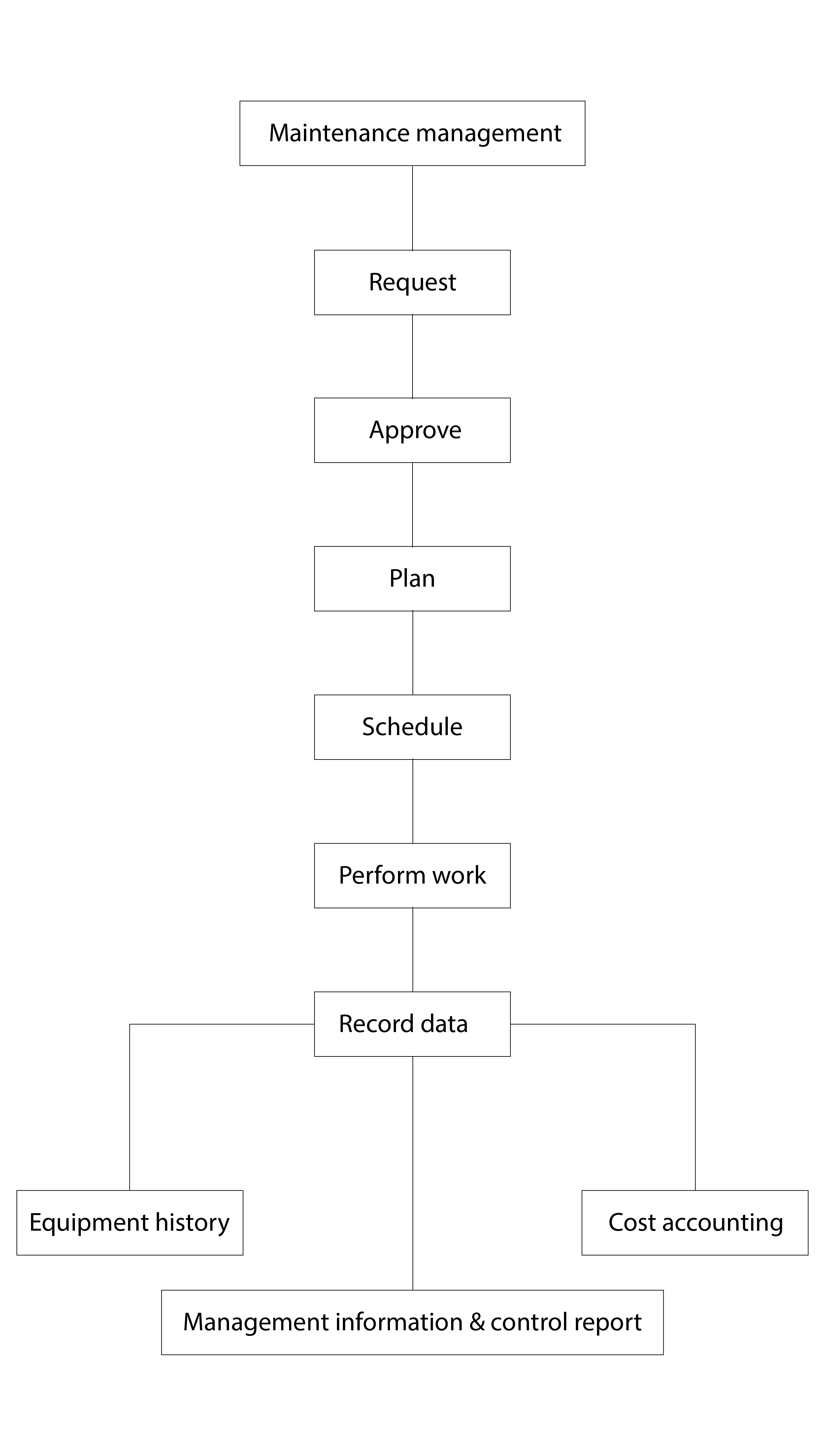
The different steps of implementing a CMMS plan

A computerized maintenance management system (CMMS) is any software package that maintains a computer database of information about an organization's maintenance operations. This information is intended to help maintenance workers do their jobs more effectively (for example, determining which machines require maintenance and which storerooms contain the spare parts they need) and to help management make informed decisions (for example, calculating the cost of machine breakdown repair versus preventive maintenance for each machine, possibly leading to better allocation of resources).

CMMS data may also be used to verify regulatory compliance. To properly control the maintenance of a facility, information is required to analyze what is occurring. Manually, this requires a tremendous amount of effort and time. A CMMS also allows for record keeping, to track completed and assigned tasks in a timely and cost-effective manner.

== See also ==
- 1:5:200
- Building lifecycle management
- Computer-aided facility management (CAFM)
- Corrective maintenance
- Enterprise asset management (EAM)
- Facility management
- Fixed assets register (FAR)
- Inspection
- Logistics management
- Maintenance, repair and operations
- Predictive maintenance
- Preventive maintenance
