= Energy management system (building management) =

System for managing building energy usage

An Energy Management System is, in the context of energy conservation, a computer system which is designed specifically for the automated control and monitoring of those electromechanical facilities in a building which yield significant energy consumption such as heating, ventilation and lighting installations. The scope may span from a single building to a group of buildings such as university campuses, office buildings, retail stores networks or factories. Most of these energy management systems also provide facilities for the reading of electricity, gas and water meters. The data obtained from these can then be used to perform self-diagnostic and optimization routines on a frequent basis and to produce trend analysis and annual consumption forecasts.

Energy management systems are also often commonly used by individual commercial entities to monitor, measure, and control their electrical building loads. Energy management systems can be used to centrally control devices like HVAC units and lighting systems across multiple locations, such as retail, grocery and restaurant sites. Energy management systems can also provide metering, submetering, and monitoring functions that allow facility and building managers to gather data and insight that allows them to make more informed decisions about energy activities across their sites.

Smart Energy Management System (SEMS) usually refers to energy management systems capable of dynamically adapting and efficiently managing new energy scenarios with minimal human intervention through the use of artificial intelligence. These systems typically include self-supervised learning (SSL) machine learning models for energy consumption and generation forecasting which allows for better planning of the operation of energy infrastructure. The models also typically take into account energy price data and through the use of mathematical optimization algorithms (typically linear programming) are able to minimize the energy costs of a given system.

Smart Energy Management Systems (SEMS) are used in both residential sector, such as SoliTek NOVA and in commercial/industrial applications of various types. SEMS plays a key role in most smart grid concepts as it enables use cases such as virtual power plants and demand response.

As electric vehicle (EV) charging becomes more popular smaller residential devices that manage when an EV can charge based on the total load vs total capacity of an electrical service are becoming popular. The global energy management system market is projected to grow exponentially over the next 10–15 years.

The energy management of smart grids, battery storage systems, electric mobility, and renewable energy sources is an important area of application of the Internet of Things in the context of smart homes and smart buildings.

== Protocols ==
In residential settings, the S2 Standard was developed in 2010. The S2 Standard provides a standard communication protocol, enabling communication between smart devices and an EMS. It is an open source protocol for the energy management of energy intensive devices found in the build environment, such as photovoltaic (PV) systems, electric vehicle (EV) chargers, batteries, (hybrid) heat pumps and white goods. It is built in such a way that it can work with any flexible device from any manufacturer, and that it would work for any energy management use case. The standard was ratified as a European standard by the European Electrotechnical Committee for Standardization (CENELEC) in 2018, in the form of the EN 50491–12 series.

An EMS can provide energy efficiency through process optimization by reporting on granular energy use by individual pieces of equipment. Newer, cloud-based energy management systems provide the ability to remotely control HVAC and other energy-consuming equipment; gather detailed, real-time data for each piece of equipment; and generate specific, real-time guidance on finding and capturing savings opportunities.

== See also ==
- Energy accounting
- Energy conservation measure
- Energy management
- Energy management software, software to monitor and optimize energy consumption in buildings or communities
