= Facility management =

Interdisciplinary field

Facility management (also facilities management, FM) is the coordinated management of an organization's buildings, sites and workplaces, and the support services needed to keep them functional, safe and effective for occupants and operations.

The scope of facilities management varies by organization and sector, but commonly includes building operations and maintenance (for example mechanical, electrical and plumbing systems), space and workplace planning, and workplace services such as cleaning, security and catering.

International standards for facilities management include the ISO 41000 series, such as ISO 41001 (a management system standard for facility management) and ISO 41011 (which defines key terminology). ISO 41001:2018 specifies requirements for a facility management system.

== History ==
The concept of facilities management originated in the 1960s, primarily in the context of IT systems management. The term was coined by IBM alumnus and Electronic Data Systems founder Ross Perot, to describe the integration of network management and support services. Over time, it expanded to include broader elements of building and operational management.

Facility management as integral to the processes of strategic organizational planning was represented during a 1979 conference sponsored by Herman Miller. Following the meeting, the furniture manufacturer opened the Facility Management Institute (FMI), with its headquarters in Ann Arbor, Michigan.

The National Facility Management Association (NFMA) was formed in 1980, separating the overall profession from a single enterprise. In 1982, the NFMA expanded to form the International Facility Management Association (IFMA)

In 1986, the first professional FM organization was launched in the UK, as the Association of Facility Managers (AFM).

== Definitions and scope ==
The terms facility management and facilities management are often used interchangeably.

ISO 41011:2024 defines facility management as an "organizational function which integrates people, place and process within the built environment with the purpose of improving the quality of life of people and the productivity of the core business."

ISO/TR 41013:2017 provides additional context on the scope, key concepts and benefits of facility management and the use of ISO 41011 terminology.

Professional guidance notes that organizations vary in what they include within the facilities function. In some cases, it includes real estate oversight or project work in addition to service delivery and workplace operations.

=== Scope ===
Facilities management is divided into two major categories:

1. Hard FM, referring to the management of physical infrastructure, including HVAC, plumbing, lighting, and maintenance.
2. Soft FM, referring to services supporting occupants including cleaning, catering, security, and event setups.

=== Key Competencies ===
According to the IFMA: "FM is the practice of coordinating the physical workplace with the people and work of the organization. It integrates the principles of business administration, architecture, and the behavioral and engineering sciences." In a 2017 global job task analysis, IFMA identified eleven competencies of facility management as:

- leadership and strategy
- operations and maintenance
- finance and business
- environmental stewardship and sustainability
- project management
- Human factors and ergonomics
- real estate and property management
- facility and technology management
- risk management
- communication
- quality and performance

The Institute of Workplace and Facilities Management, formerly the British Institute of Facilities Management, adopted the European definition and through its accredited qualification framework offers career path curriculum ranging from school leaver level through to master's degree level that is aligned with the European Qualifications framework.

FM may also cover activities other than business services: these are referred to as non-core functions and vary from one business sector to another. FM is also subject to continuous innovation and development, under pressure to reduce costs and to add value to the core business of public or private sector client organizations.

=== Accredited academics ===
Facility management is supported with education, training, and professional qualifications often coordinated by FM institutes, universities, and associations. Degree programs exist at both undergraduate and post-graduate levels. Facility Management has been a recognised academic discipline since the 1990s. Initial FM research work in Europe started in universities in the UK, the Netherlands and the Nordic countries, where academies funded research centers and began to establish courses at Bachelors, Masters, and PhD levels.

Early European FM research centers include the Centre for Facilities Management (CFM), founded in Glasgow in 1990; the Centre for People and Buildings at Delft University of Technology; and Metamorphose at the Norwegian University of Science and Technology. The University of Moratuwa Faculty of Architecture in Sri Lanka has offered a BSc. degree in Facilities Management since 2006.

In 2018, 50 universities and research institutions were represented in EUROFM. The German Facility Management Association (GEFMA) has certified 16 FM study programs and courses at universities and universities of applied sciences in Germany.

As of 2021, IFMA accredits university degree programs in the United States, Sri Lanka, South Korea, Singapore, Germany, Sweden, Hong Kong, Ireland, and the Netherlands.

== Facilities manager ==
A facilities manager is the practitioner responsible for delivering facilities management within an organization, including coordinating building operations, maintenance and workplace services, either directly or through external providers. In practice, the role spans strategic planning (aligning facilities and services with organizational needs) and day-to-day operations (ensuring safe, reliable building performance and service delivery).

Facilities managers may be employed directly by an organization or work for external service providers, depending on how facilities services are sourced and delivered.

=== Health, safety and regulatory compliance ===
A core responsibility of facilities management is supporting compliance with legal and regulatory obligations related to the built environment, including occupational health and safety, building regulations, access control and fire regulations, and managing related risks.

Fire safety responsibilities often include organizing inspection, testing and maintenance of fire protection and life safety systems and maintaining required records where applicable.

Security responsibilities commonly include maintaining physical security measures such as access control systems and surveillance hardware; staffing models for guarding may be managed separately depending on the organization.

=== Operations, maintenance and asset management ===
Facilities managers oversee building operations and maintenance to keep facilities safe, reliable and fit for purpose. This can include planned preventive maintenance, reactive repairs, statutory inspections and performance monitoring of building services such as HVAC, electrical and plumbing systems.

Many organizations plan, schedule and document maintenance and service delivery using digital systems such as computerized maintenance management systems (CMMS) or computer-aided facility management (CAFM) platforms.

=== Workplace services ===
Facilities managers may also coordinate workplace services that support occupants and daily operations. Depending on the organization, this can include cleaning, grounds maintenance, waste management, catering, reception and security services, which are often outsourced or delivered via mixed in-house and contracted arrangements.

=== Service desk and work request management ===
Many facilities organizations use a service desk or help desk as a single point of contact for building issues and service requests. Requests are typically triaged and prioritized, then routed to in-house staff or contracted providers for resolution and tracking.

=== Risk management and business continuity ===
Facilities managers often contribute to emergency preparedness, incident response and recovery, and business continuity planning related to the built environment and critical building systems.

=== Space planning and workplace change ===
Space allocation, workplace standards and moves, adds and changes are common facilities functions, particularly in office and campus environments. This work may involve coordinating layouts, accommodating growth or reconfiguration, and ensuring that workplaces meet relevant requirements such as fire safety, accessibility, ventilation, lighting and welfare facilities.

== World Facilities Management Day ==
Since 2009, Global FM has sponsored a "World FM Day" to celebrate and recognize the contributions of facilities management professionals.

== See also ==
- Building information modeling
- Building management
- Computerized maintenance management system
- Global Facility Management Association (Global FM)
- International Facility Management Association
- Property management
