= Halifax bus station =

Bus station serving Halifax, West Yorkshire, England

Coordinates: 53°43′30″N 1°51′32″W

Halifax
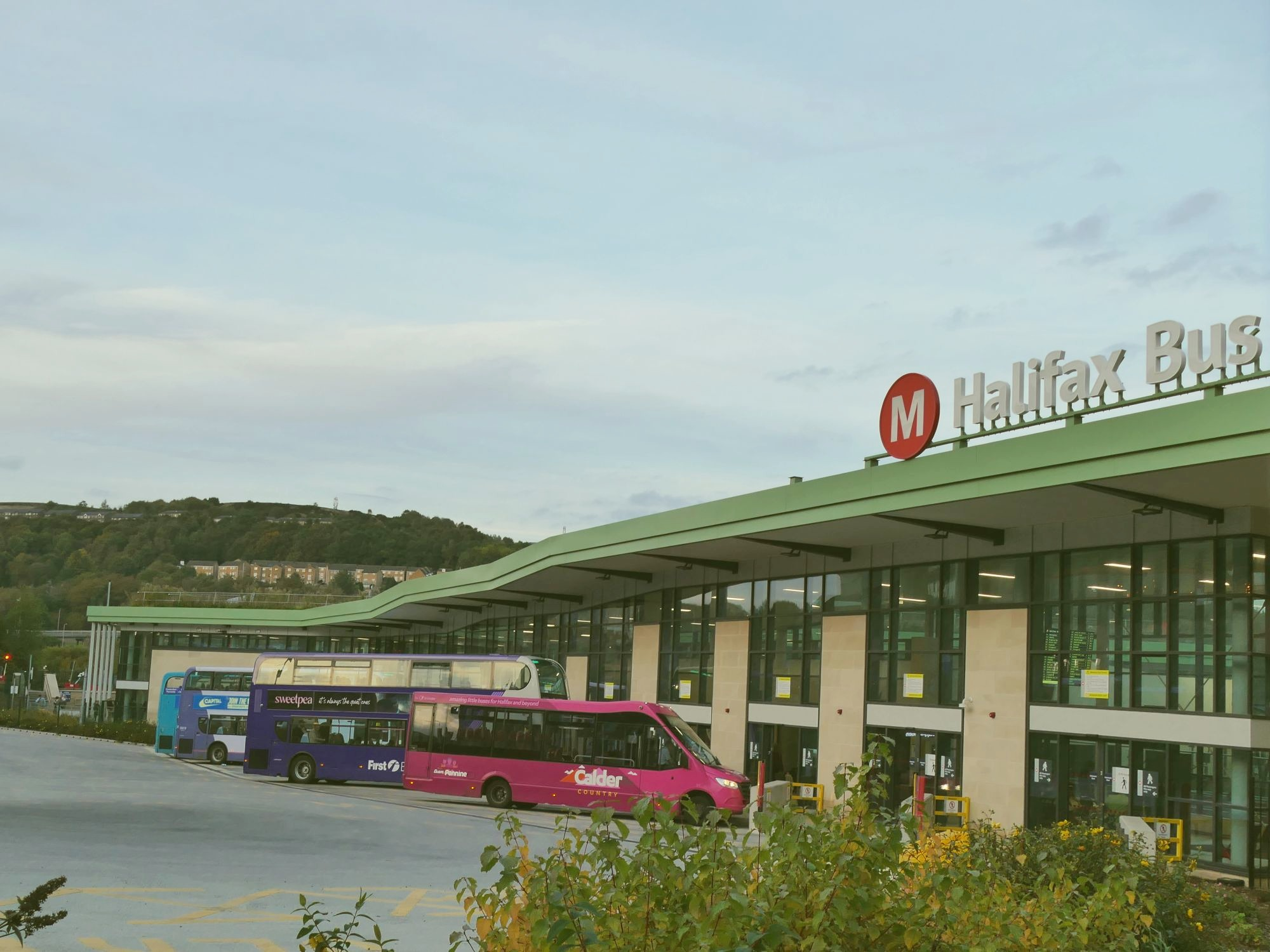
- The redeveloped bus station in 2024

General information
- Location: Wade Street, Halifax; Calderdale; England
- Operator: West Yorkshire Metro
- Bus routes: 47
- Bus stands: 19 (2 set down stands)
- Bus operators: First West Yorkshire, Arriva Yorkshire, Team Pennine
- Connections: Halifax railway station (660 yards (600 m))

Construction
- Cycle facilities: Parking spaces located at the Northgate entrance
- Accessible: Wheelchair accessible entrances and disabled toilet facilities

Other information
- Website: wymetro.com/buses/bus-stations/halifax-bus-station

History
- Opened: 1 October 2023
- Rebuilt: 1954 – Cross Fields Bus Station; 1989 – Wade Street Bus Station (aisle version); 2023 – Wade Street Bus Station (modern version)
Location

Halifax bus station serves the town of Halifax, West Yorkshire, England. The bus station is owned and managed by West Yorkshire Metro. Formerly consisting of several island platforms, after a period of part-closure and relocation to some temporary stands, the bus station was reopened on 1 October 2023 consisting of 19 reversal bays, a layover and 4 accessible entrances. The bus station is situated in the Halifax Town Centre and could be accessed from Northgate, Winding Road and Wade Street.

== Redevelopment ==
In March 2021, preparatory works began for a replacement bus station. Construction had already started by September 2021 with only a few stands left in service which were: A2, A3, A4, B1, B2 and B3. As well as this stands A5 and B4 were used as a layover bay. Phase 2 construction started in October, where the bus station switched to the left side so that the left side can be demolished. The new temporary lay out consisted of six bus stands using some old D and C bus stands as B1, B2 and B3. Stand E3 became A2 and some bus stops were put in for Stands A3 and A4. Phase 3 construction began on Sunday 27 February 2022, where the bus station had been moved towards the south of the site with a six stand reversal bay temporary bus station. This bus station consisted stand A to F.

The new bus station will consist of 19 stands with stands 1–9 being on the south bays and then Stands 10–19 being on the north. The Bus Station will also be fully enclosed with solar power energy on the roof tops. Coaches will depart from Stand 1 and Stands 2 & 3 will be set down stands. All stands will be designed so that wheel-forward buses can use them.

The cost of the redevelopment is £15.4 million. It will improve connectivity with important places in Halifax like Halifax Sixth Form and the Piece Hall.

As of 1 October, the final construction phase (phase 4) commenced for the redevelopment of the bus station. This allowed the brand new bus station to open officially to the public with all the services from the temporary bus station being allocated to this site. However, most services do terminate/start around the town centre as the carriageway to the bottom stands, A – J is awaiting completion.

== Completion ==
As of July 2024, the final phase of construction came to a close with all 19 bus stands in use. This saw the return of several bus services to the site, including national express coach services. The site consists of numerous facilities such as ATMs, defibrillators, newsagent's shop, public toilets and a Travel shop.

== Services ==
The main operators that use the station are First West Yorkshire, Arriva Yorkshire and Team Pennine.

Buses run from the bus station to several destinations in the Calderdale area, such as Barkisland, Bradshaw, Brighouse, Copley, Elland, Greetland, Illingworth, Northowram, Ripponden, Southowram, Sowerby Bridge, Sowerby, Stainland and West Vale. Buses also travel to destinations outside the local area, reaching Bradford, Leeds and Keighley.

Several services, such as the majority of services to Illingworth and Mixenden used to serve bus stops in the town centre instead of serving the site however this is no longer the case.

A full list of services shown below:

Bus Route	From	To	Via
20	Halifax	Rye Lane	Pellon Lane
21	Halifax	Highroad Well	Hanson Lane and Highroad Well Asda
22	Halifax	Claremount	Boothtown
255	Halifax	Leeds	Hipperholme, Scholes, Cleckheaton, Gomersal, Birkenshaw, and Drighlington
343	Halifax	Huddersfield	Calderdale Hospital, Greetland, Elland, Ainley Top and Huddersfield Infirmary
501	Halifax	Huddersfield	Calderdale Hospital, Elland, Ainley Top and Huddersfield Infirmary
502	Halifax	Keighley	Ovenden, Illingworth, Denholme, Cullingworth and Ingrow
508	Halifax	Leeds	Northowram, Shelf, Odsal Top, Thornbury and Armley
509	Halifax	Mixenden	Hebble Lane and Wheatley
510	Halifax	Mixenden	Hebble Lane and Wheatley
511	Halifax	Mixenden	Pellon Lane, Mount Tabor, Wheatley and Lee Mount
512	Halifax	Mixenden	Pellon Lane, Mount Tabor, Wheatley and Lee Mount
513	Halifax	Wainstalls	Pellon Lane, Mount Tabor, Mixenden, Wheatley and Lee Mount
521	Halifax	Illingworth	Ovenden
522	Halifax	Illingworth	Ovenden
523	Halifax	Illingworth	Ovenden
524	Halifax	Mixenden	Ovenden
526	Halifax	Shelf	Ovenden, Illingworth, Bradshaw and Queensbury
530	Halifax	Fountainhead Village	Pellon Lane
532	Halifax	Skircoat Green	Highroad Well, King Cross and Scar Bottom
534	Halifax	Northowram	Stump Cross and Shibden
536	Halifax	Huddersfield	Calderdale Hospital, Stainland, Outlane, Oakes and Marsh
537	Halifax	Huddersfield	Calderdale Hospital, Elland, Stainland, Outlane and Marsh
539	Halifax	Holmfirth	Calderdale Hospital, West Vale, Stainland, Slaithwaite and Meltham
541	Halifax	Norton Tower	Highroad Well
542	Halifax	Norton Tower	Highroad Well
543	Halifax	Siddal	Bailey Hall Road
546	Halifax	Warley Town	Savile Park, King Cross, Highroad Well and Newlands
547	Halifax	Norwood Green	Hipperholme
548	Halifax	Rastrick	Hipperholme and Brighouse
549	Halifax	Huddersfield	Hipperholme, Brighouse, Rastrick, Fixby and Birkby
561	Halifax	Ripponden	Calderdale Hospital, Copley, Sowerby Bridge, Soyland and Barkisland
562	Halifax	Ripponden	Calderdale Hospital, Copley, Sowerby Bridge, Soyland and Barkisland
563	Halifax	Brighouse	Calderdale Hospital, Copley, Elland and Rastrick
563A	Halifax	Brighouse	Calderdale Hospital, Copley, Elland and Rastrick
571	Halifax	Shelf	Southowram, Brighouse, Lightcliffe and Hipperholme
574	Halifax	Midgley	Savile Park, King Cross, Sowerby Bridge, Luddendenfoot and Luddenden
576	Halifax	Bradford	Boothtown, Queensbury and Great Horton
577	Halifax	Boulderclough	Savile Park, Sowerby Bridge and Sowerby
579	Halifax	Sowerby	King Cross and Sowerby Bridge
586	Halifax	Rishworth	King Cross, Sowerby Bridge, Triangle and Ripponden
587	Halifax	Rochdale	King Cross, Sowerby Bridge, Triangle, Ripponden and Littleborough
590	Halifax	Rochdale	Mytholmroyd, Hebden Bridge, Todmorden, Walsden and Littleborough
591	Halifax	Burnley	Mytholmroyd, Hebden Bridge, Todmorden, Cornholme and Cliviger
592	Halifax	Todmorden	King Cross, Luddendenfoot, Mytholmroyd and Hebden Bridge
681	Halifax	Bradford	Northowram, Shelf and Odsal Top
682	Halifax	Bradford	Northowram, Shelf and Odsal Top
X1	Halifax	Huddersfield	Calderdale Hospital, Elland and Ainley Top
