= List of schools in Calderdale =

This is a list of schools in Calderdale in the English county of West Yorkshire.

== State-funded schools ==
=== Primary schools ===
- Abbey Park Academy, Illingworth
- All Saints' CE Junior and Infant School, Halifax
- Ash Green Community Primary School, Mixenden
- Bailiffe Bridge Junior and Infant School, Bailiff Bridge
- Barkisland CE Primary School, Barkisland
- Beech Hill School, Halifax
- Bolton Brow Primary Academy, Sowerby Bridge
- Bowling Green Academy, Stainland
- Bradshaw Primary School, Bradshaw
- Burnley Road Academy, Mytholmroyd
- Calder Primary School, Mytholmroyd
- Carr Green Primary School, Rastrick
- Castle Hill Primary School, Todmorden
- Central Street Infant School, Hebden Bridge
- Christ Church CE Junior School, Sowerby Bridge
- Christ Church CE Primary School, Pellon
- Cliffe Hill Community Primary School, Lightcliffe
- Colden Junior and Infant School, Colden
- Copley Primary School, Copley
- Cornholme Junior and Infant School, Cornholme
- Cross Lane Primary School, Elland
- Dean Field Community Primary School, Ovenden
- Elland CE Junior and Infant School, Elland
- Ferney Lee Primary School, Todmorden
- Field Lane Primary School, Rastrick
- The Greetland Academy, Greetland
- The Halifax Academy, Halifax
- Hebden Royd CE Primary School, Hebden Bridge
- Heptonstall Junior and Infant School, Heptonstall
- Holy Trinity CE Primary School, Halifax
- Holywell Green Primary School, Holywell Green
- Lee Mount Primary School, Lee Mount
- Lightcliffe CE Primary School, Lightcliffe
- Ling Bob Junior and Infant School, Pellon
- Longroyde Junior School, Rastrick
- Luddenden CE School, Luddendenfoot
- Luddendenfoot Academy, Luddendenfoot
- Midgley School, Midgley
- Moorside Community Primary School, Ovenden
- Mount Pellon Primary Academy, Halifax
- New Road Primary School, Sowerby Bridge
- Norland CE School, Norland
- Northowram Primary School, Northowram
- Old Earth Primary School, Elland
- Old Town Primary School, Wadsworth
- Parkinson Lane Community Primary School, Halifax
- Ripponden Junior and Infant School, Ripponden
- Riverside Junior School, Hebden Bridge
- Sacred Heart RC Academy, Sowerby Bridge
- St Andrew's CE Infant School, Brighouse
- St Andrew's CE Junior School, Brighouse
- St Augustine's CE School, Halifax
- St John's CE Primary Academy, Clifton
- St John's RC Primary School, Rishworth
- St Joseph's RC Primary Academy, Brighouse
- St Joseph's RC Primary Academy, Halifax
- St Joseph's RC Primary Academy, Todmorden
- St Malachy's RC Primary School, Illingworth
- St Mary's CE Junior and Infant School, Sowerby Bridge
- St Mary's RC Primary Academy, Halifax
- St Michael and All Angels CE Primary School, Shelf
- St Patrick's RC Primary Academy, Elland
- Salterhebble Junior and Infant School, Halifax
- Salterlee Primary School, Shibden
- Savile Park Primary School, Halifax
- Scout Road Academy, Mytholmroyd
- Shade Primary School, Todmorden
- Shelf Junior and Infant School, Shelf
- Siddal Primary School, Halifax
- Stubbings Infant School, Hebden Bridge
- Todmorden CE Junior and Infant School, Todmorden
- Triangle CE Primary School, Triangle
- Trinity Academy Akroydon, Halifax
- Trinity Academy St Chad's, Brighouse
- Trinity Academy St Peter's, Sowerby
- Tuel Lane Infant School, Sowerby Bridge
- Wainstalls School, Wainstalls
- Walsden St Peter's CE Primary School, Walsden
- Warley Road Primary Academy, Halifax
- Warley Town School, Warley
- West Vale Primary School, West Vale
- Whitehill Community Academy, Illingworth
- Withinfields Primary School, Southowram
- Woodhouse Primary School, Brighouse

=== Non-selective secondary schools ===
- Brighouse High School, Brighouse
- The Brooksbank School, Elland
- Calder High School, Mytholmroyd
- The Halifax Academy, Halifax
- Lightcliffe Academy, Lightcliffe
- Park Lane Academy, Exley
- Rastrick High School, Rastrick
- Ryburn Valley High School, Sowerby
- Todmorden High School, Todmorden
- Trinity Academy Grammar, Sowerby Bridge
- Trinity Academy, Halifax, Halifax

=== Grammar schools ===
- The Crossley Heath School, Halifax
- North Halifax Grammar School, Illingworth

=== Special and alternative schools ===
- Highbury School, Rastrick
- Ravenscliffe High School, Halifax
- Wood Bank School, Luddendenfoot
- The Whitley AP Academy, Illingworth

=== Further education ===
- Calderdale College
- The Maltings College
- Trinity Sixth Form Academy

== Independent schools ==
=== Primary and preparatory schools ===
- Beacon Lights Schools, Halifax
- The Gleddings School, Halifax

=== Senior and all-through schools ===
- Hipperholme Grammar School, Hipperholme
- Rishworth School, Rishworth

=== Special and alternative schools ===
- Brearley Hall School, Luddendenfoot
- Broadwood High School, Pellon
- Compass Community School North, Elland
- Compass Community School Willow Park, Sowerby Bridge
- Endeavour House School, Moor End
- Millcourt School, Shelf
- Nightingale House School, Cragg Vale
- Riverbank Primary School, Ripponden
- Stafford Hall School, Halifax
- William Henry Smith School, Brighouse
