= Luddendenfoot =

Village in West Yorkshire, England

Coordinates: 53.717797°N 1.938139°W

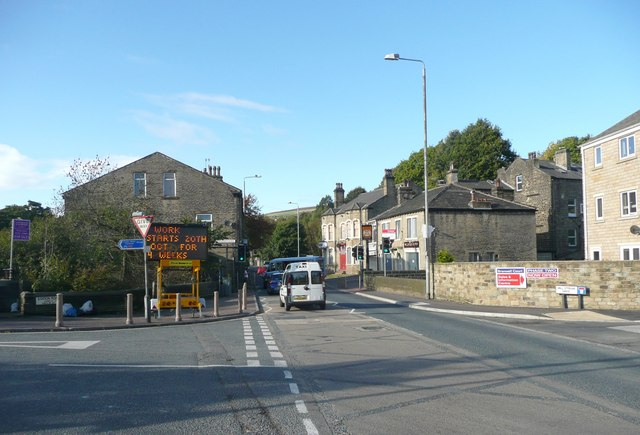
- Burnley Road, Luddendenfoot

- Location within West Yorkshire
- Population: 2,547 (Based on output areas 2011 census)
- OS grid reference: SE041246
- Metropolitan borough: Calderdale
- Metropolitan county: West Yorkshire
- Region: Yorkshire and the Humber
- Country: England
- Sovereign state: United Kingdom
- Post town: Halifax
- Postcode district: HX2
- Police: West Yorkshire
- Fire: West Yorkshire
- Ambulance: Yorkshire
- UK Parliament: Calder Valley

Luddendenfoot or Luddenden Foot is a village in West Yorkshire, England. It is in the borough of Calderdale, to the northwest of Sowerby Bridge and west of Halifax. The population of Luddendenfoot is 2,547, with the wider Calderdale Ward having a population of 10,653 at the 2011 Census. The village lies along the Upper Calder Valley below Luddenden, between Sowerby Bridge and Mytholmroyd.

== History ==
The settlement grew up around the confluence of Luddenden Brook and the River Calder and the existence of the woollen textile industry. The industrial growth facilitated by the opening of the Rochdale Canal in 1804 and the opening of the Manchester and Leeds Railway in 1840. There were several mills including Boy Mill, Luddendenfoot Mill, Delph Mill and Denholme Mill. None of these mills remain in their original use.

Between 1840 and 1962 the village was served by Luddendenfoot railway station.

Luddendenfoot grew up around the industry along the river and brook, then later the canal; then the railway and then the A646 Burnley Road.

In the late 20th century, many houses along Burnley Road were cleared and a new housing estate at Kershaw was developed. In the early 21st century, housing has been built on a cleared mill site in the centre of the village.

== Governance ==
There is just one tier of local government covering Luddenden Foot, at metropolitan district level, being Calderdale Borough Council, based in Halifax.

The village historically straddled the chapelries of Midgley, Sowerby and Warley, all of which formed part of the ancient parish of Halifax. The three chapelries became separate civil parishes in 1866. The village was made a local government district in 1868, governed by a local board. Such local boards were reconstituted as urban district councils in December 1894 under the Local Government Act 1894. The 1894 Act also said that parishes could not straddle district boundaries, and so a new parish called Luddendenfoot was created at the same time covering the same area as the urban district. In 1931 the parish had a population of 2,881.

On 1 April 1937, the parish and urban district were abolished and absorbed into the neighbouring parish and urban district of Sowerby Bridge. Sowerby Bridge Urban District was in turn abolished in 1974 under the Local Government Act 1972 and the area became part of the metropolitan borough of Calderdale. No successor parish was created for the former Sowerby Bridge Urban District and so Luddendenfoot is directly administered by Calderdale Borough Council.

The settlement is part of the Luddendenfoot ward of the part of the metropolitan county of West Yorkshire. The Luddendenfoot ward covers a wider area and includes the villages of Mytholmroyd, Luddenden, Midgley, Booth, Wainstalls, Cragg Vale and Boulderclough.

The ward has, over the years, elected councillors from all of the three main parties. However, as of May 2019, all three seats are held by Labour councillors and this is the first time this has happened since 1973. The current councillors by date elected are Jane Scullion (Deputy Leader of Calderdale), Scott Patient and Roisin Cavanagh.

== Education ==
There are two primary schools in Luddendenfoot; Luddendenfoot Academy, formerly Luddendenfoot Junior and Infant School and Luddenden CE School.

== Cultural reference and notable people ==
- Luddendenfoot is the subject of a poem "Full Moon" by Simon Armitage, published in 2008 in Gig: The Life and Times of a Rock-star Fantasist, in which he comments on the rumoured pagan practices of the town.
- The actor Peter Alexander, who starred in Emmerdale Farm and numerous pantomimes in Yorkshire, lives here.
- Luddenden was also used as the exterior funeral parlour for the then Yorkshire Television's In Loving Memory.
- The Rochdale Canal in the village was used as a filming location in Happy Valley
- Luddendenfoot Rugby League Club appeared in the first round of the Rugby League Challenge Cup in 1899 as an amateur side, losing 63–3 away at Salford.
- Branwell Brontë worked at Luddendenfoot Railway Station in 1841

== See also ==
- Listed buildings in Luddendenfoot

== Gallery ==
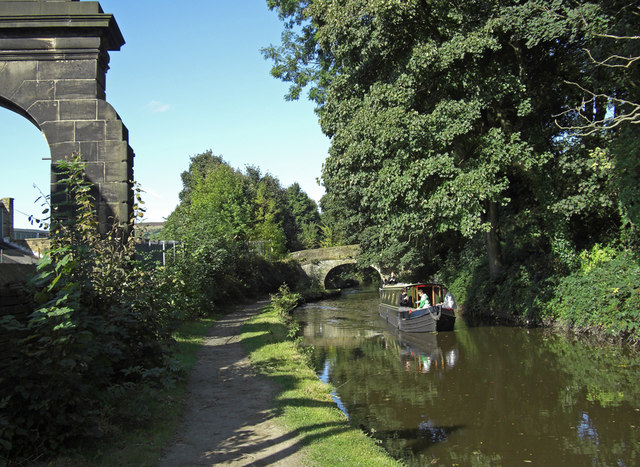
Rochdale Canal

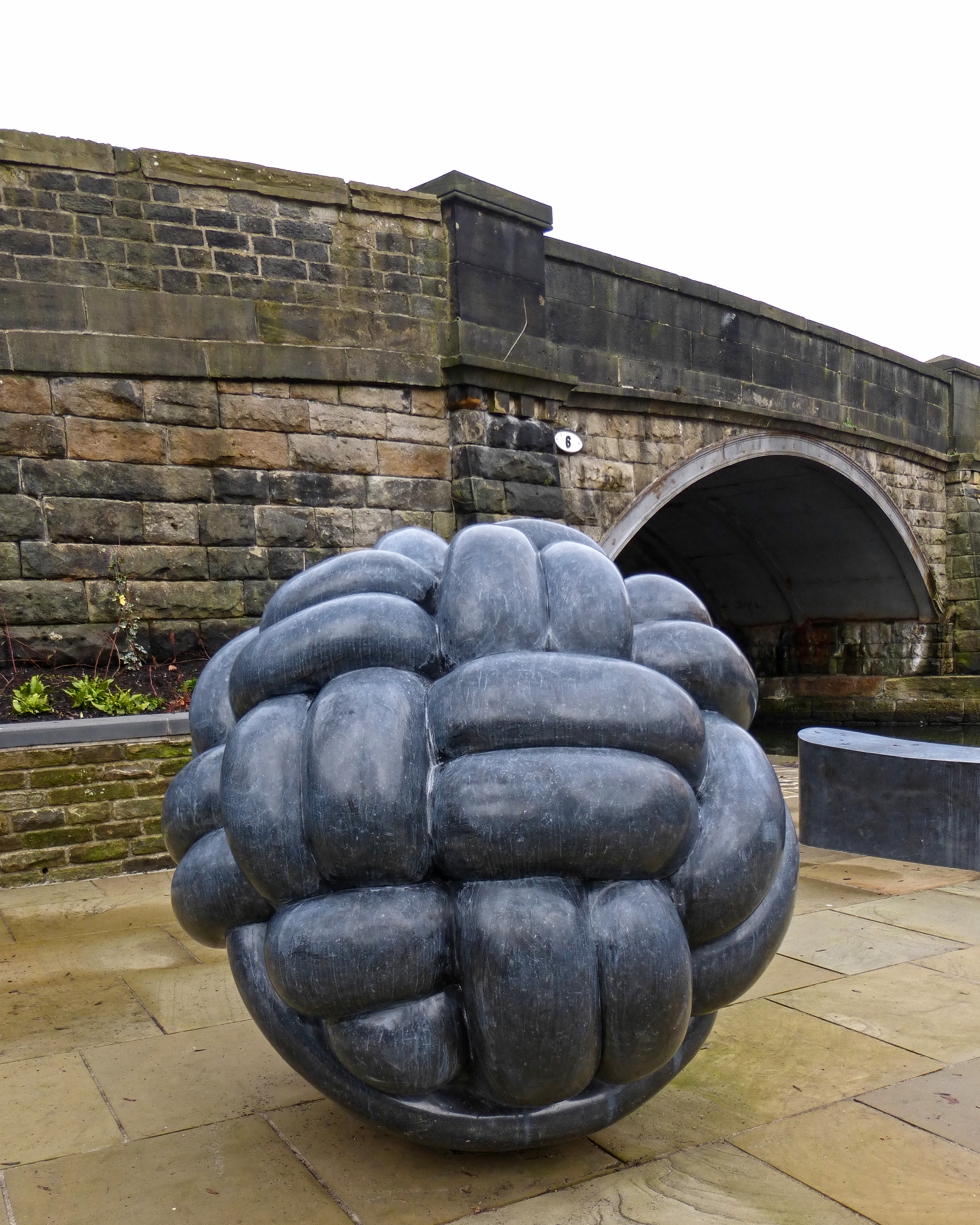
Public Art by the Rochdale Canal

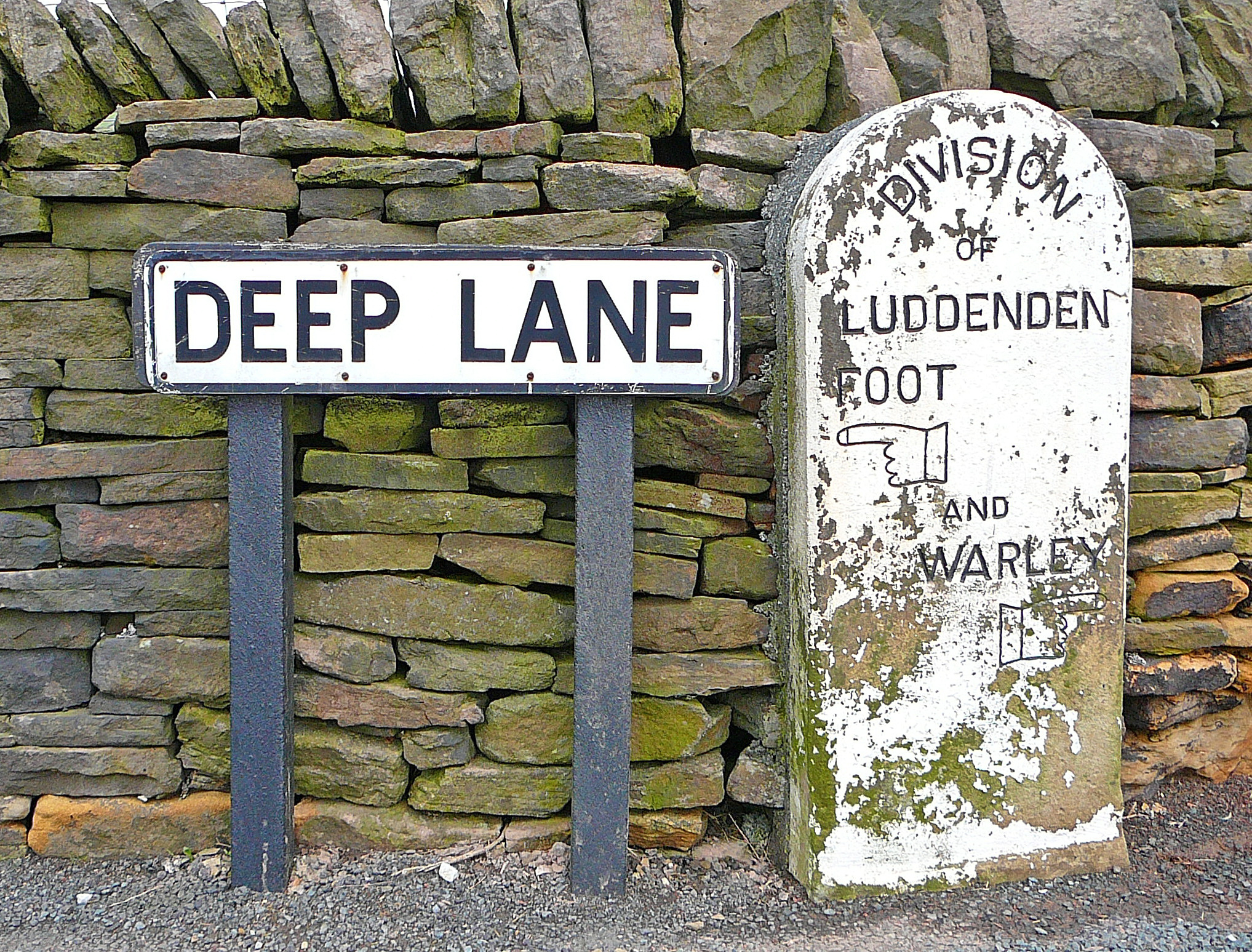
Former boundary marker denoting Luddendenfoot and Warley districts.

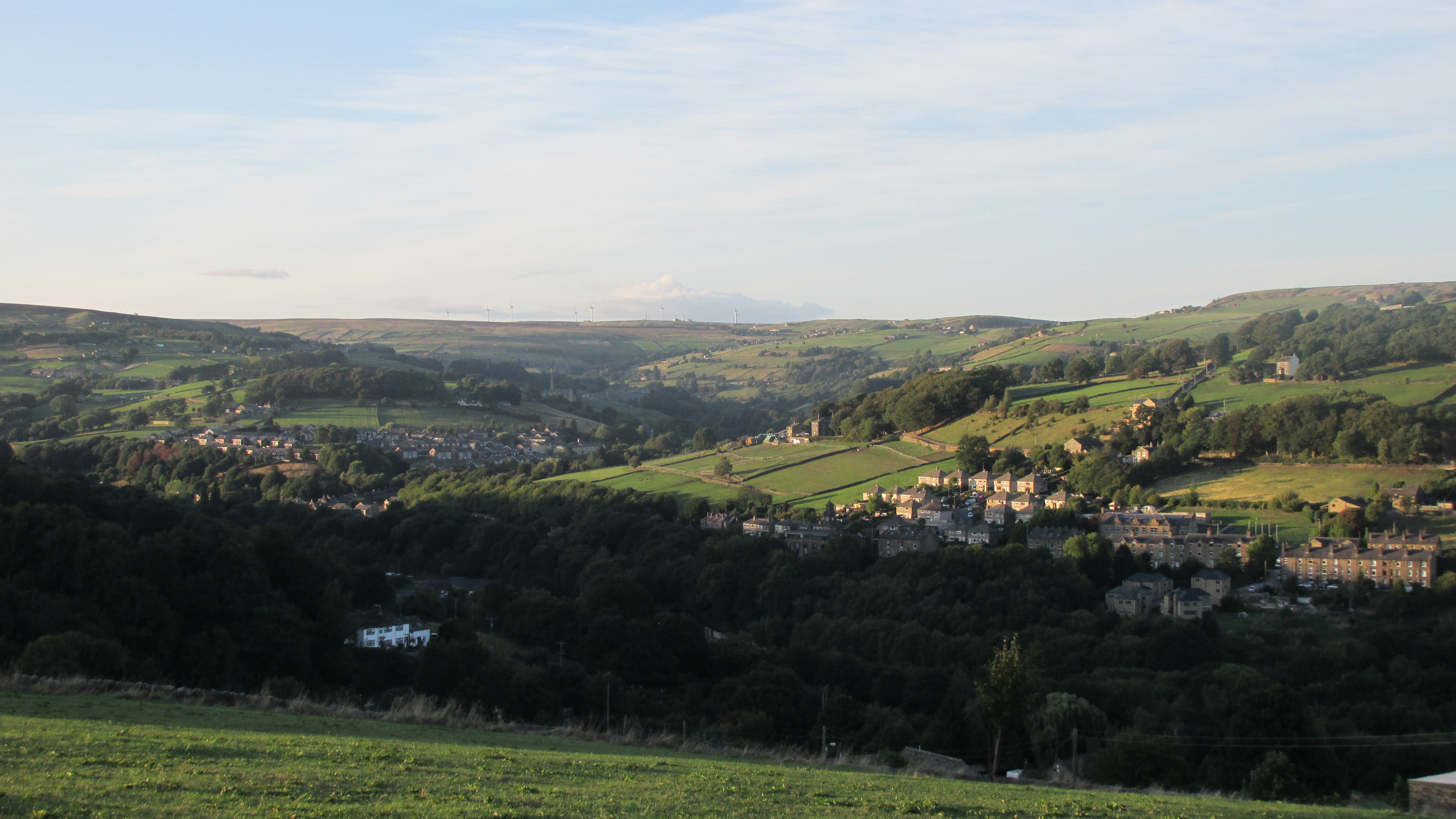
Luddendenfoot in the summer

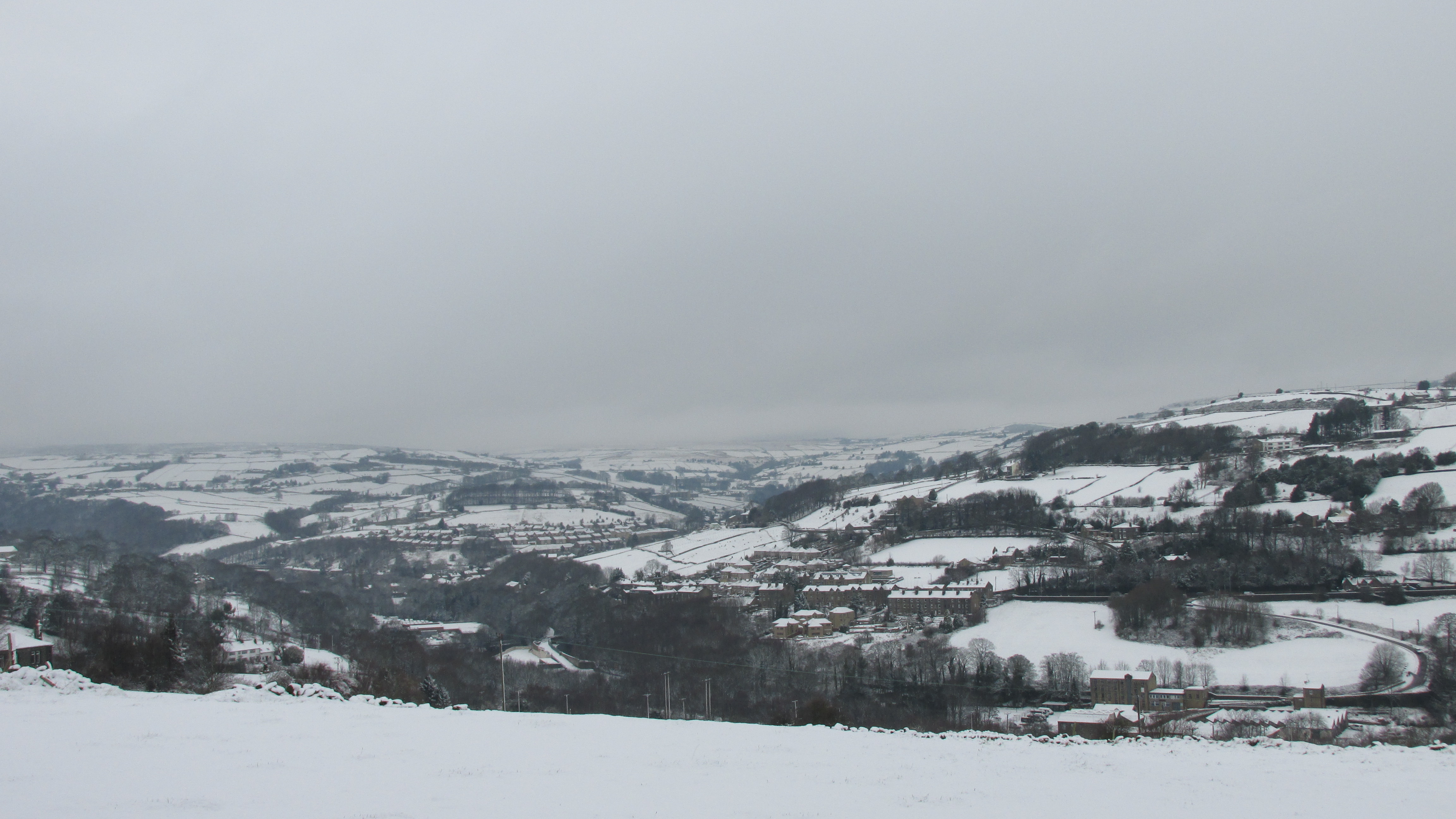
Luddendenfoot in the winter

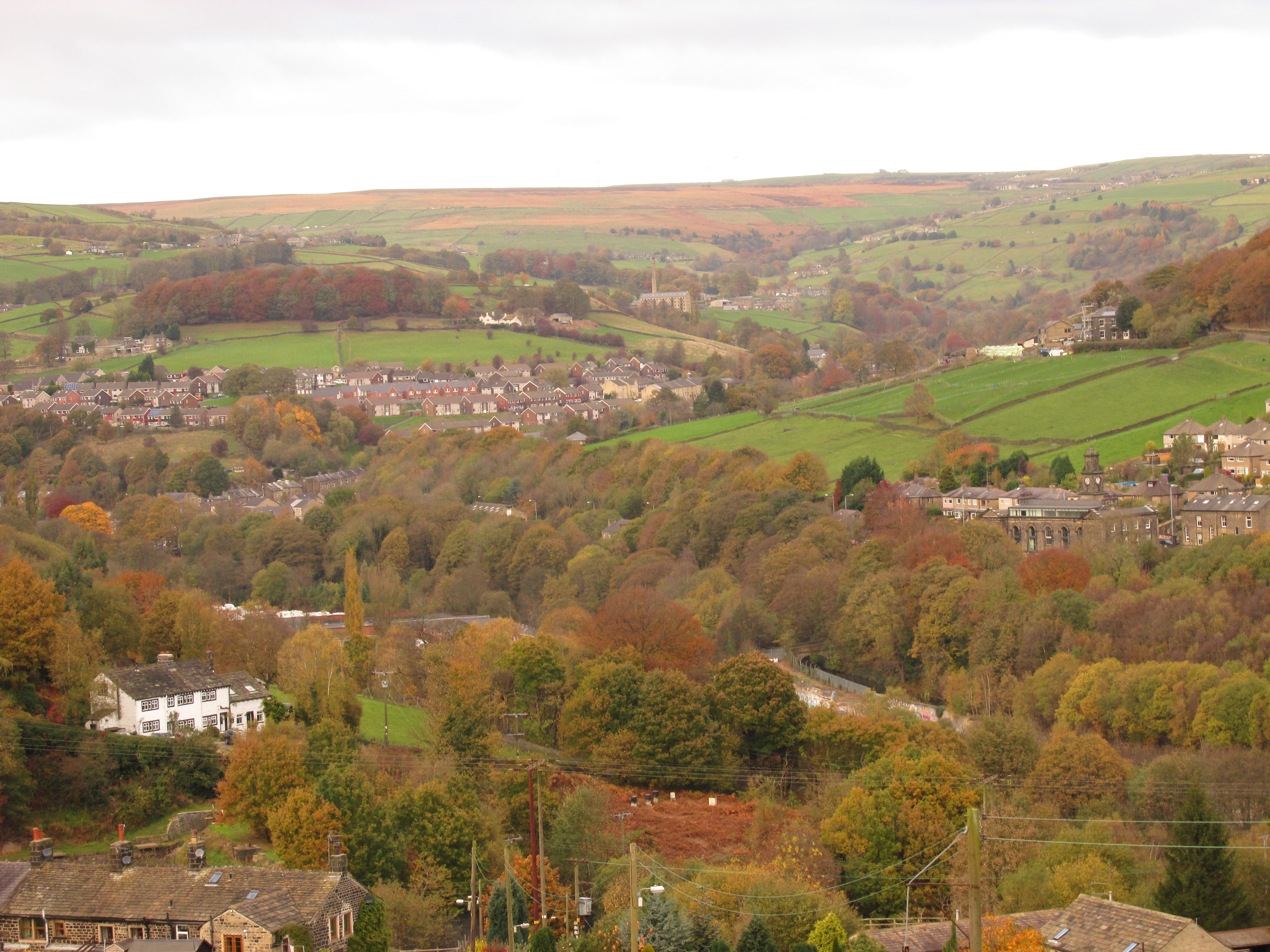
Luddendenfoot in the Autumn
