= List of schools in West Yorkshire =

There is no county-wide local education authority in West Yorkshire, instead education services are provided by the five smaller metropolitan boroughs of Bradford, Calderdale, Kirklees, Leeds and Wakefield:

- List of schools in Bradford
- List of schools in Calderdale
- List of schools in Kirklees
- List of schools in Leeds
- List of schools in Wakefield
