= Boulderclough =

Village in West Yorkshire, England

Coordinates: 53.7102°N 1.94996°W

- Location within West Yorkshire
- OS grid reference: SE034237
  - London: 170 mi (270 km) SE
- Metropolitan borough: Calderdale
- Metropolitan county: West Yorkshire
- Region: Yorkshire and the Humber
- Country: England
- Sovereign state: United Kingdom
- Post town: HALIFAX
- Postcode district: HX6
- Police: West Yorkshire
- Fire: West Yorkshire
- Ambulance: Yorkshire

Boulderclough is a small village in the Borough of Calderdale in West Yorkshire, England. The village is situated between Sowerby at the south and Mytholmroyd at the north, and is approximately 3 miles (5 km) west from the centre of the town of Halifax.

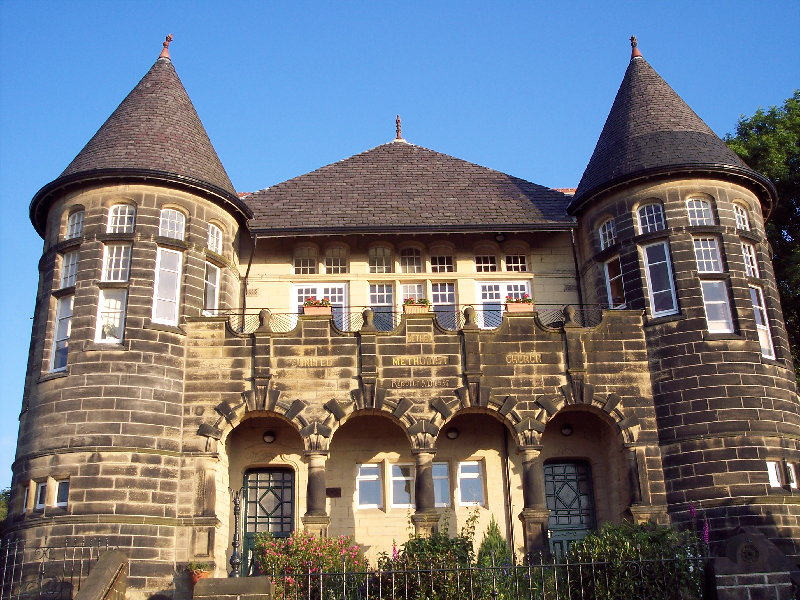
Bethel Methodist church, Boulder Clough

The village contains a Methodist chapel, which is Grade II Listed. The village public house closed some years ago; the nearest pub is at Sowerby Castle Hill half-a-mile to the south-east. There are footpaths, and a river that runs by a small woodland area.
