= Listed buildings in Luddendenfoot =

Luddendenfoot is a ward and an unparished area in the metropolitan borough of Calderdale, West Yorkshire, England. It contains 151 listed buildings that are recorded in the National Heritage List for England. Of these, one is listed at Grade I, the highest of the three grades, two are at Grade II*, the middle grade, and the others are at Grade II, the lowest grade. The ward contains the villages of Luddenden, Luddenden Foot and Midgley and smaller settlements, and is otherwise largely rural. After agriculture, its main industry has been textiles, initially this was a domestic industry, and there are remains of the industry in some listed houses, including taking-in doors. Later came mills, some of which still exist, often now converted for other purposes, and these have been listed. The largest surviving mill is Oats Royd Mill, and many of its buildings are listed. The nearby home of its owner, Oats Royd House, is also listed, together with some of its associated structures. Otherwise most of the listed buildings are houses and associated structures, laithe houses and cottages, farmhouses and farm buildings. The Rochdale Canal and the River Calder run through the ward, and the listed buildings associated with these are bridges and an aqueduct. Otherwise, the listed buildings include churches and items in a churchyard, chapels, a public house, a pinfold, a set of stocks, a school, a milepost, and a war memorial.

== Key ==
Grade	Criteria
I	Buildings of exceptional interest, sometimes considered to be internationally important
II*	Particularly important buildings of more than special interest
II	Buildings of national importance and special interest

== Buildings ==
Name and location	Photograph	Date	Notes	Grade
Westfield Farmhouse, House and doorway 53.71871°N 1.92957°W	—	Late 16th to early 17th century	The building has an earlier timber framed core, and was extended in the 17th and 19th centuries. It is in stone and has a stone slate roof, hipped to the right, and with a coped gable, a shaped kneeler, and a finial. There are two storeys and a complex plan, consisting of a front of four bays, the left two bays being cross-wings, one of which was added later, and a later rear extension. The main doorway has a chamfered surround and a lintel with an ornamental motif, and attached to the left of the house is a doorway with a chamfered surround, an ogee head and an inscribed, dated and scrolled lintel. The windows are mullioned, some also with transoms, and some with hood moulds.	II
Cliff Hill and archway 53.73423°N 1.95839°W		1601	The house was altered and the archway added in about 1700. It is in stone and has a stone slate roof with a coped gable and shaped kneeler on the right. There are two storeys, and five bays, the left two bays being later and the left bay projecting, and two rear outshuts. The main doorway has a chamfered quoined surround and an arched and dated lintel. The windows are mullioned, and over the ground floor openings is a continuous hood mould. In the left return is a taking-in door. The archway links the house to a barn, and has a round arch and a keystone.	II
High House; 53.74349°N 1.94716°W	—	1606	The house, which has been much rebuilt, is in stone, and has a stone slate roof with coped gables, kneelers, and finials. There are two storeys and three bays, the right bay projecting. On the front is a porch with a moulded doorway, and an internal doorway with a chamfered quoined surround and a dated lintel, and there is a similar doorway at the rear. Most of the windows are mullioned, some with hood moulds, and in the left gable end are pigeon holes with ledges.	II
Lower Snape Farmhouse; 53.70846°N 1.95341°W	—	1623	The farmhouse is in stone on a plinth, and has a stone slate roof with chamfered coped gables and shaped kneelers. There are two storeys, three bays, and at the rear is a central wing, and a single-storey outshut to the left. The doorway has a decorative chamfered surround with a triangular head, sunk spandrels, and a lintel with a dated panel, and above it is a recess containing a bell. The windows are mullioned, and in the ground floor is a continuous hood mould over the openings.	II
Cross base and shaft 53.73230°N 1.93907°W	—	1624	The cross base and shaft are in the churchyard of St Mary's Church and were returned to their present site in the early 20th century. They are in stone and consist of a rectangular chamfered base with a square socket containing the base of the shaft.	II
Raw End Farmhouse; 53.71777°N 1.95043°W		1624	The farmhouse is in stone, on a plinth, and has a stone slate roof with coped gables and the bases of finials. There are two storeys, four bays, and a partial rear outshut. The doorway on the front has a chamfered quoined surround, a Tudor arched head and a datestone above it, and there is a similar doorway at the rear. The windows are mullioned.	II
West Royd; 53.72308°N 1.93181°W	—	1624	A stone farmhouse with quoins, and a stone slate roof with coped gables. There are two storeys and four bays. On the front are two doorways, both with chamfered quoined surrounds. The left doorway has an inscribed deep Tudor arched lintel; the surround of the other doorway is also moulded, and has a lintel with sunk spandrels containing initials, and a sunk panel with the date. Most of the windows are mullioned, with some mullions removed, and there is a continuous hood mould over the ground floor openings.	II
1/4, 2 and 3 Warley Wood Lane, Friendly; 53.71451°N 1.92751°W		Early 17th century (probable)	A house that was extended and converted into cottages in the 19th century. It is in stone with quoins, and a stone slate roof with coped gables, a shaped kneeler, and crocketed finials. There are two storeys, three bays, and two gabled rear wings. The main doorway has a chamfered quoined surround and a Tudor arched lintel. The windows are mullioned and most contain arched lights.	II
Barn to south of Cliff Hill; 53.73407°N 1.95845°W	—	Early 17th century (probable)	The barn has a timber framed core, it was clad in stone later in the 17th century, and altered in the 18th century. It contains quoins, and has a stone slate roof. There are four bays and an aisle behind the right two bays. On the front is a round-arched cart entry with a quoined and chamfered surround and a coped gable with shaped kneelers, a doorway, an inserted window, and a mullioned window. At the rear is a blocked opposing cart entry.	II
Cooper House; 53.71755°N 1.93874°W	—	Early 17th century	The house was extended in the 18th century, the earlier part being the rear wing. It is in stone with a stone slate roof. There are two storeys and a cellar, a main range of three bays, a rear wing and a later brick outshut. The main range faces the garden and has a porch and sash windows. At the rear the windows are mullioned, some with transoms and some with hood moulds.	II
Barn at Higher Oldfield; 53.71773°N 1.93360°W	—	Early 17th century or earlier	The barn has a timber framed core, later clad in stone, it has quoins, and a stone slate roof, hipped on the right. There are four bays, an aisle, and an outshut on the right. The barn contains a central quoined cart entry with a gable, and in the outshut are two doorways with chamfered quoined surround and a Tudor arched head, and a window.	II
Lower Quick Stavers; 53.70827°N 1.96272°W	—	Early 17th century (probable)	The house has been extended and divided into three dwellings. It is in stone and has a stone slate roof with coped gables and finials. There are two storeys and it consists of a hall range with two bays, a lower cross-wing on the right and a later cross-wing on the left. On the front is a two-storey gabled porch that has a doorway with a moulded surround and a four-centred arch. Inside there are stone benches and an inner doorway with a chamfered and quoined surround. The windows are mullioned, some also have transoms, and some have hood moulds.	II
The Old Farmhouse, High Lee Farmhouse and High Lee; 53.71963°N 1.95255°W	—	Early 17th century	A house, considerably rebuilt in the 18th century, and divided into three dwellings. It is in stone with quoins, a stone slate roof, two storeys and three bays. The house contains a doorway with a chamfered lintel and a later doorway to the right, and the windows are mullioned.	II
Upper Quick Stavers Farmhouse; 53.70697°N 1.96188°W	—	Early 17th century (probable)	A stone farmhouse that has a stone slate roof with coped gables. There are two storeys, two bays, and outshuts at the rear and to the right. The two doorways have chamfered surrounds, and most of the windows are mullioned, some with arched lights.	II
Roebucks; 53.72399°N 1.93622°W	—	1633	A house in rendered stone that has a stone slate roof with coped gables and shaped kneelers. There are two storeys, four bays, and a rear wing. The first two bays are gabled and project, and in the third bay is a two-storey porch. The porch has a plinth and a doorway with fluted jambs, imposts, and a fluted ogee lintel, and above it is a datestone. At the rear is a doorway with a chamfered quoined surround and a Tudor arched head. Most of the windows are mullioned, some are sashes, and some have hood moulds. Inside there is an inglenook and a bressumer.	II
Lord Nelson Inn; 53.73191°N 1.93916°W		1634	The public house is in rendered stone and has a stone slate roof. There are two storeys, and an L-shaped plan, with a north front of two gabled bays, the right bay projecting, and three gabled bays at the rear, the outer bay projecting. The doorway has a triangular arch with a moulded arris and a dated lintel. Most of the windows are mullioned, in the upper floor at the front is a five-light mullioned and transomed window. Above this window is a hood mould, and there is a continuous hood mould over the ground floor openings.	II
Greave House; 53.72849°N 1.94320°W	—	Early to mid 17th century	The house is in painted and rendered stone, and has a stone slate roof. There are two storeys and a cellar, a front of five bays, the left two bays being gabled cross-wings, and a rear outshut. In the middle bay is a doorway with a moulded surround, the upper floor of the first bay contains a Venetian window with a keystone, and the other windows are mullioned, with a continuous moulded hood mould over the windows in the four right bays. At the rear, one of the gables has a shaped kneeler and a ball finial.	II
Kershaw House; 53.72553°N 1.94107°W		Early to mid 17th century	The house, which was largely rebuilt in 1650, is in stone on a chamfered plinth, with quoins and a stone slate roof. There are two storeys and the house consists of three parallel ranges with fronts of three gabled bays. In an angle on the main front is a two-storey gabled porch on a moulded plinth, containing a round-arched doorway with a moulded surround and imposts. Inside it are stone benches, and the inner doorway has a chamfered surround and a Tudor arched lintel. Above the doorway is a string course enclosing a dated plaque, in the upper floor is a rose window with a decorative hood mould, and the gable has moulded coping and finials. The windows are mullioned, many with transoms.	I
Shaw's Lane Top Farmhouse; 53.69806°N 1.96943°W	—	Early to mid 17th century (probable)	The farmhouse, which was altered in the 20th century, is in stone with quoins and a stone slate roof. It consists of a range with one storey and an attic and two bays, and a two-storey bay on the left. On the front is a porch that has a coped gable with kneelers and a finial, and a doorway with a chamfered quoined surround and a Tudor arched head with spandrels. Inside the porch are stone benches and a similar internal doorway. The windows are mullioned, some with hood moulds, and in the roof are three 20th-century dormers and a skylight.	II
Tray Royd; 53.73535°N 1.95372°W	—	Early to mid 17th century (probable)	A farmhouse that was later altered, it is in stone on a plinth, with quoins on the left and a buttress on the right, and a stone slate roof with a coped gable and shaped kneelers on the left. There are two storeys and three bays. On the front is a doorway with a Tudor arch and a dated lintel, and at the rear is a doorway with a chamfered and quoined surround and an arched head. Most of the windows are mullioned, and some have decorative hood moulds.	II
Hand Carr Farmhouse and Farm; 53.72313°N 1.95470°W	—	1640	The farmhouse has been extended and divided into two dwellings. It is in stone and has a stone slate roof with a shaped kneeler on the left. There are two storeys, four bays, and a continuous outshut at the front. The doorway has an ogee lintel with spandrels, a date panel, and a hood mould, and there is an internal porch with stone benches, and an internal arched doorway. The windows are mullioned, and some have hood moulds.	II
Oats Royd House; 53.73523°N 1.94328°W		1645	The house was extended in the 19th century, with the east range replacing the earlier range. It is in stone with a stone slate roof. The east range has rusticated quoins, and eaves band, a modillion cornice, a blocking course, and a hipped roof. There are two storeys and a basement, and a symmetrical front of five bays. Steps lead up to the central doorway that has a Tuscan portico, a deep cornice, and a fanlight. The windows are sashes, in the ground floor they have triangular pediments, and the middle window in the upper floor is tripartite. At the rear, the older part is on a chamfered plinth, it has two storeys and an attic, and two bays with a porch between. The windows are mullioned, most are also transomed, and they have decorative hood moulds. The porch has a moulded round-arched doorway with imposts, and a keystone with a bearded head, and above it is a dated plaque. Inside the porch are stone benches, and a chamfered Tudor arched doorway.	II
Bank House and adjoining barn 53.74793°N 1.94063°W	—	1650	A stone house, pebbledashed at the rear, with a stone slate roof and two storeys. The windows are long and mullioned, those in the ground floor with arched lights and hood moulds. The barn is under the same roof has an entrance with an inscription.	II
Bridge House, Luddenden; 53.73181°N 1.93892°W	—	17th century	The oldest part of the house is the basement, the rest dating from the late 18th or early 19th century. It is in stone with quoins with a stone slate roof. There are three storeys and a basement, and two bays. The windows are mullioned, and at the rear are paired doorways.	II
Chest tomb 53.73228°N 1.93866°W	—	Mid 17th century	The chest tomb is in the churchyard of St Mary's Church and is to the memory of Thomas Murgatroyd of East Riddlesden Hall. It is in stone, there is leaf carving and bulbous decoration on the base, and inset brass panels on the top.	II
Great House and Cottage; 53.73421°N 1.95534°W	—	Mid 17th century	The house, later divided into two dwellings, is in stone, and has a stone slate roof with coped gables and kneelers. There are two storeys, a hall range and a cross-wing, and a rear service wing. The main doorway has a quoined chamfered surround and a Tudor arched head, and there are simpler inserted doorways. The windows are mullioned, some with hood moulds, including a continuous hood mould over the ground floor openings.	II
Greystones Farmhouse and Cottage; 53.72159°N 1.93580°W	—	Mid 17th century	The farmhouse, later divided into two dwellings, is in stone, partly rendered, with quoins and a stone slate roof. There are two storeys, a front of four bays, the left bay projecting, and an outshut and a wing at the rear. The doorway has a plain surround, and most of the windows are mullioned, some with hood moulds.	II
Hartley Royd; 53.73282°N 1.93367°W	—	17th century	A stone house with a stone roof and two storeys, a rear wing and a rear outshut. On the front is a central two-storey gabled porch and mullioned windows. The rear wing has a hipped roof, and the windows in the upper floor also have transoms.	II
Haven; 53.71905°N 1.96416°W	—	Mid 17th century (probable)	The farmhouse is in stone on a plinth, with quoins, and a stone slate roof with coped gables and shaped kneelers. There are two storeys and three bays. On the front is a gabled porch, and to its left is a chamfered quoined doorway blocked and converted into a window. The windows are mullioned.	II
Higgin; 53.71374°N 1.94843°W	—	17th century	A house with a cottage added in the late 18th or early 19th century, it is in stone and has stone slate roofs with a coped gable and a shaped kneeler on the right. There are two storeys, and it consists of a two-bay range, a cross-wing on the left, a wing projecting from the rear left, and the cottage on the right. The doorways have chamfered quoined surrounds, and the windows are mullioned, some with hood moulds.	II
Higgin Chamber; 53.71455°N 1.94890°W	—	17th century	A stone house that has a stone slate roof with coped gables, shaped kneelers, finials, and a stone carved with a head in the gable valley. There are two storeys, a front of two gabled bays, and an outshut on the left. The right return facing the road has two bays, the right bay projecting and gabled. The doorways have plain surrounds, the windows are mullioned, some also with transoms and some with hood moulds, and in the left return is a taking-in door.	II
Wall with bee boles, water spout and trough, Kershaw House; 53.72553°N 1.94131°W	—	Mid 17th century (probable)	The wall to the southwest of the house is in stone, it is about 6.5 metres (21 ft) long, and has quoins and a flat coping. The wall contains three rectangular bee boles, to the left of them is a water spout discharging into a rectangular stone trough, and further to the left is another wider bee bole.	II
Lacey Hey Farmhouse and Cottage; 53.73349°N 1.95716°W	—	Mid 17th century (probable)	The farmhouse, divided into two dwellings, is in stone on a chamfered plinth, with quoins, and a stone slate roof with coped gables and kneelers. There are two storeys, three bays, and outshuts. On the front is a doorway with a quoined surround, and at the rear a doorway with a chamfered surround and an arched lintel. The windows are mullioned, some with hood moulds, and on the front is a re-set datestone.	II
Little Town Farmhouse; 53.73039°N 1.92361°W	—	17th century	A stone farmhouse with a stone roof, two storeys, and a lean-to at the rear. On the front is a two-storey gabled porch, the windows are mullioned, and there is a continuous hood mould on the east part of the front.	II
Lower Benns Farmhouse; 53.73914°N 1.93317°W	—	17th century	A laithe house, it has a timber framed core encased in stone, it is mainly rendered, and has quoins and a stone slate roof. There are two storeys, the house has two bays and the barn has three. In the house are mullioned windows, those in the ground floor with hood moulds, and the entrances to the barn are in recessed porches.	II
Lower Shaw Booth; 53.74492°N 1.92871°W	—	17th century	A stone house that was altered in the 18th century, it has a broad stone roof, two storeys, and a lower rear wing. The windows are mullioned with hood moulds.	II
Mill House; 53.73484°N 1.94341°W	—	17th century	The house is in painted stone on a plinth, and has a stone slate roof with coped gables, shaped kneelers, and a finial. There are two storeys, four bays, and rear extensions. On the front is a gabled porch, and a doorway with a chamfered and quoined surround, and there is another doorway to the left with a plain surround. The windows in the ground floor are sashes, and in the upper floor they are mullioned.	II
Old Riding; 53.74092°N 1.93142°W	—	17th century (probable)	The house, which incorporates earlier material, is in stone with a stone roof. There are two storeys, and it contains mullioned windows, some with hood moulds.	II
Oldfields Farmhouse and barn 53.73940°N 1.92626°W	—	17th century	The farmhouse and barn are in stone with a stone roof. The house has two storeys and a rear wing, and contains an arched doorway and mullioned windows, all with hood moulds. The barn dates probably from the 18th century, and has an arched cart entry and a Venetian window above.	II
Shield Hall Bakery and barn 53.71062°N 1.94923°W	—	17th century	A house, at one time a bakery, and a barn in stone with a stone slate roof. The house has quoins, two storeys and two bays. The doorway has a plain surround, and the rest of the front has been altered. In the barn is a cart entry with a quoined surround and a tripartite lintel with a shaped keystone, above which is an inserted window, and to the right a segmental-arched doorway.	II
Upper Long Bottom Farmhouse and Cottage; 53.71534°N 1.93568°W	—	17th century (probable)	The farmhouse, which has been altered and subdivided, is in stone with quoins, and a stone slate roof with gables that have moulded coping and inturned kneelers. There are two storeys, three bays and a cross-wing on the left. On the front is a gabled porch with a re-set dated lintel, and the windows are mullioned.	II
Upper Reap Hurst; 53.74399°N 1.92395°W	—	17th century	The house, which was remodelled at the rear in the 19th century, is in stone with a stone roof. There are two storeys, and a gabled wing to the east of the south front. The windows have five lights and mullions, and in the ground floor they also have transoms.	II
Upper Saltonstall Farmhouse; 53.75212°N 1.94797°W	—	17th century	The farmhouse is in stone with a stone roof and two storeys. The south front contains long mullioned windows, and the rear has been largely rebuilt and extended.	II
Upper Stubbings Farmhouse and barn 53.73281°N 1.93108°W	—	17th century	The farmhouse and the barn, which was added in the 18th century, are in stone with stone roofs. The farmhouse has two storeys and an L-shaped plan, and its windows are mullioned. The barn contains an arched cart entry with a Venetian window above.	II
White Birch Farmhouse and Barn; 53.72929°N 1.93329°W	—	1654	The farmhouse is in rendered stone and has a stone roof. There are two storeys, and a low wing to the east. The windows are mullioned, and the barn is to the west.	II
Upper Foot Farmhouse and Cottage; 53.72605°N 1.95051°W	—	1659	The farmhouse probably has an earlier timber framed core, and it was later expanded, altered and divided into two. It is in stone with quoins, and a stone slate roof with coped gables and shaped kneelers. There are two storeys and an L-shaped plan, with a two-bay range, a cross-wing on the right, and two rear wings. On the front is a doorway with a quoined moulded surround and a notched and dated lintel, and at the rear is a doorway with a quoined and chamfered surround and a Tudor arch. Most of the windows are mullioned, and there is a sash window and a round-headed stair window.	II
Front garden wall, Kershaw House; 53.72542°N 1.94087°W	—	1660	The wall, which encloses a rectangular garden to the east of the hall, is in stone with quoins and moulded coping, and is about 3 metres (9.8 ft) high. The north wall is partly embattled. In the west wall is a doorway with a chamfered quoined surround, an ogee head, and a dated lintel, the east wall contains a doorway with a chamfered moulded surround and a round-arched head, and in the south wall is a chamfered arched light.	II
Jack Hey Farmhouse; 53.71186°N 1.94198°W	—	Mid to late 17th century	The farmhouse is in millstone grit with quoins and a stone slate roof with coped gables, shaped kneelers, and a finial on the left gable. There are two storeys, two bays and a rear wing on the right. The windows are mullioned, and the doorway at the rear has tiestones.	II
Farm building east of Dry Carr Farmhouse; 53.74592°N 1.95057°W	—	Late 17th century	Possibly the cross-wing of a house and later extended and used as a farm building, it is in stone with quoins and a stone slate roof, There are two storeys and two bays. The doorways and windows have plain surrounds, and the windows are mullioned.	II
Barn northwest of Jack Heys Farmhouse; 53.71188°N 1.94224°W	—	Late 17th century (probable)	The barn is in stone with quoins and a stone slate roof. There are three bays and an outshut to the front on the right. The barn contains a central cart entry, a window and a doorway on the front, and at the rear is a threshing door in a blocked cart entry, and a vent.	II
Toot Hill End and barn 53.70015°N 1.95816°W	—	Late 17th century	A laithe house, with the barn refronted in the 18th century. It is in stone with quoins, and a stone slate roof with coped gables and chamfered kneelers. There are two storeys and three bays, the two left bays being paired cross-wings. In the right bay is a doorway with a chamfered and quoined surround and a Tudor arched head with sunk spandrels. Most of the windows are mullioned. The barn to the right has a central round-arched cart entry with voussoirs, and a triple keystone, windows, and pigeon holes with ledges.	II
Upper Snape and barn 53.70015°N 1.95816°W	—	1677	The farmhouse was extended and the barn added in the 18th century. The buildings are in stone with quoins, and stone slate roofs with a coped gable and a kneeler on the left. The house has two storeys, four bays, and a rear outshut. One of the doorways has a chamfered quoined surround and an arched head, and the other doorways have plain surrounds. The windows are mullioned, and some have hood moulds. The barn, at right angles to the house, contains a round-arched cart entry with tiestones and a keystone, a doorway with a plain surround, and windows.	II
Peel House; 53.73763°N 1.93346°W	—	1691	The house is in stone with a stone slate roof, and two storeys. It consists of a hall range with two cross-wings that have gables and finials, and a gabled wing and outshut at the rear. On the front is a two-storey porch with an arched doorway that has a dated and initialled lintel. The windows are mullioned with round-arched lights.	II
Booth Stead Farmhouse; 53.73318°N 1.92543°W	—	17th to early 18th century	The farmhouse is in stone with a stone slate roof. There are two storeys, the windows are mullioned, and at the rear is a later porch.	II
Lower Height Farmhouse and barn 53.75976°N 1.95841°W	—	17th to early 18th century	The farmhouse and barn are in stone with a stone slate roof. The house has two storeys, a rear lean-to, and mullioned windows. The barn attached to the west contains a large arched entrance.	II
Lower Holme House; 53.74573°N 1.93962°W	—	17th to early 18th century	A stone house with a stone roof, two storeys, and a lean-to at the rear containing the entrance. On the front are mullioned windows, with a continuous hood mould over the ground floor windows.	II
Lower Saltonstall Farmhouse; 53.75152°N 1.94123°W	—	Late 17th to early 18th century	The farmhouse is in stone with a stone slate roof. There are two storeys and a gabled rear wing. On the front are mullioned windows, with hood moulds over the ground floor windows, and at the rear the windows have been altered. The doorway has a lugged architrave and a cornice.	II
Moor Cock Inn and barn 53.75867°N 1.93257°W	—	Late 17th to early 18th century	A stone building with a stone roof and two storeys. The front is irregular, and contains mullioned windows with a continuous hood mould over the ground floor windows. To the west is an aisled barn.	II
Sand House; 53.72219°N 1.96025°W	—	Late 17th to early 18th century	A laithe house in stone with quoins and a stone slate roof. The house has one storey and an attic and two bays, and the barn to the right has two bays. The house has a doorway with a chamfered surround and mullioned windows. In the barn is a cart entry with a chamfered quoined surround and a monolithic lintel, a doorway with a chamfered surround, and slit vents.	II
Greenhill; 53.75149°N 1.94032°W	—	1711	A stone house with a stone roof, two storeys and four bays. The doorways have plain surrounds, and the doorway on the front has a dated lintel. The windows are mullioned.	II
Hole Bank Head and Farm Cottage; 53.72026°N 1.95615°W	—	Early 18th century	A house and two cottages, later two dwellings, in stone with quoins and a stone slate roof. The windows are mullioned, and the doorways have been inserted.	II
Outbuilding southeast of Upper Quick Stavers Farmhouse; 53.70684°N 1.96175°W	—	Early 18th century (or earlier)	The outbuilding is in stone with quoins, a stone slate roof, and sides of two bays. It contains a doorway with a quoined surround, various windows, and vents.	II
Barn range southwest of Tray Royd; 53.73522°N 1.95382°W	—	Early to mid 18th century	The barn and cowhouse are in stone with quoins, and a stone slate roof with a coped gable and shaped kneeler on the left. There are three bays, and a loft above the right bay. On the front is a round-arched cart entry and a doorway, each with a quoined and chamfered surround. At the rear is a quoined threshing door, in the left return are chamfered slit vents, and in the right return is a loft opening.	II
Shepherd House Farmhouse and outhouse 53.72494°N 1.93262°W	—	1745	The farmhouse is in painted stone with quoins, and a stone slate roof with coped gables. There are two storeys and two bays. On the front are paired doorways with stone lintels and tiestones, and an internal porch. The windows are mullioned, one of which has eleven lights. The outhouse is projecting on the left and contains a quoined doorway.	II
10, 11 and 12 High Street, Luddenden; 53.73162°N 1.93900°W	—	Mid 18th century	An industrial building with a cottage added in the 19th century and later combined into one house. It is in stone with quoins and a stone slate roof. There are two storeys and a basement, two bays, and the former cottage at the rear. The openings have plain surrounds, and the windows are mullioned. At the rear is a segmental-arched barn door, later glazed, with tiestones, imposts and voussoirs.	II
5 and 7 Saltonstall Lane; 53.75133°N 1.94071°W	—	18th century (probable)	A row of cottages, originally four, later combined into two, they are in stone with a stone roof. The cottages contain doorways with plain surrounds and simple mullioned windows.	II
49 Town Gate, Midgley; 53.73392°N 1.95837°W	—	Mid 18th century (probable)	The house, which was later extended, is in stone with quoins, and a stone slate roof with a coped gable and shaped kneelers. There are two storeys, three bays, and the gable end faces the street. On the gable end is a gabled porch, and a doorway with a chamfered and quoined surround. The windows have plain surrounds, and contain mullions.	II
Barn west of Great House; 53.73419°N 1.95568°W		Mid 18th century (probable)	A stone barn with quoins and a stone slate roof. The openings are chamfered or quoined, or both, and include a round-arched double cart doorway, other doorways, vents, and windows.	II
Hollins Gate; 53.71581°N 1.95565°W	—	Mid 18th century	A house and a cottage combined into one dwelling, the building is in stone with a stone slate roof. There are two storeys and three bays, the upper floor of the left bay built into the hillside as a single-storey cottage. The doorway has tiestones, and the windows are mullioned.	II
Lower Saltonstall; 53.75156°N 1.94088°W	—	18th century (probable)	A stone house with a stone roof and two storeys. Some of the windows are mullioned, and others are plain.	II
Barn southeast of Raw Pickle; 53.71399°N 1.92327°W	—	Mid 18th century (probable)	The barn is in stone with quoins and a stone slate roof. There are two bays, and the barn contains a segmental-arched cart entry with a quoined surround, two doorways and a mullioned window, and at the rear is an opposing cart entry and chamfered slit vents.	II
Barn northwest of Raw End Farmhouse; 53.71789°N 1.95065°W	—	18th century	A barn and a former cottage, it is in stone with a stone slate roof. There are two storeys and four bays, the left bay with an outshut. The barn contains a round-arched cart entry with quoins, voussoirs, and a springer on the left, and there is a doorway with a plain surround.	II
Barn southwest of Upper Foot Farmhouse and archway 53.72597°N 1.95087°W	—	1753	The barn is in stone with quoins, and a stone slate roof with coped gables. There are five bays, and the barn contains a central round-arched cart entry with tiestones, imposts and a keystone, doorways, one with a chamfered quoined surround and a dated lintel, mullioned windows, and vents. A segmental archway runs from the right angle of the barn and links it to the farmhouse.	II
23, 24 and 25 High Street, Luddenden; 53.73149°N 1.93956°W	—	Mid to late 18th century	A row of three cottages and a former shop now incorporated into the cottages. They are in stone with a stone slate roof, and have two storeys and three bays. The openings have plain surrounds, and the windows are mullioned.	II
Old Crib; 53.71586°N 1.96217°W	—	Mid to late 18th century	A farmhouse with an attached barn, it is in stone with quoins and a stone slate roof. There are two storeys, the house has three bays, the barn, recessed on the left, has two bays and a later extension. The house has a gabled porch, and to the right is a doorway with a plain surround and a shaped kneeler on the right. The windows are mullioned. In the barn is a round-arched cart entry with imposts, voussoirs, and a keystone, doorways and windows.	II
Rose Cottage, Midgley; 53.73388°N 1.95861°W	—	Mid to late 18th century (probable)	A stone house with quoins, and a stone slate roof with coped gables and shaped kneelers. There are two storeys, two bays, and an outshut on the right. On the front is a porch and a doorway with tiestones, and the windows are mullioned.	II
Dry Carr Farmhouse; 53.74589°N 1.95073°W	—	1771	The farmhouse is in stone with quoins, and a stone slate roof with a coped gable and shaped kneelers on the left. There are two storeys and two bays. The openings have plain surrounds, the central doorway has a dated lintel and the windows are mullioned.	II
1, 3, 5 and 7 Broad Lane and barn 53.71483°N 1.95049°W	—	Late 18th century	Four cottages and a barn combined into two dwellings, they are in stone with quoins and a stone slate roof. There are two storeys, each former cottage has one bay, and the barn has three. The cottages have doorways with plain surrounds and mullioned windows. In the barn is a blocked cart entry with quoins, imposts, voussoirs, and a keystone, a doorway with tiestones, and a window. At the rear is an opposing cart entry, and in the right return are chamfered slit vents.	II
26 Town Gate, Midgley; 53.73411°N 1.96045°W		Late 18th century (probable)	A stone house with quoins, and a stone slate roof with a coped gable and moulded kneeler on the left. There are two storeys and an attic, one bay, and a rear outshut. The left hand corner of the ground floor is rounded, the doorway has a plain surround and a slab cornice, and the windows are mullioned.	II
Outbuilding linking Great House with barn 53.73426°N 1.95555°W	—	Late 18th century	The outbuilding is in stone with a stone slate roof. There are four bays, each containing a round arch with later infill.	II
Lower Oldfield and barn 53.71712°N 1.93511°W	—	Late 18th century	The farmhouse and attached barn are in stone with quoins, and a coped gable with a shaped kneeler on the right. There are two storeys, the house has three bays, and the barn projects on the right. On the front of the house is a porch, and the windows are mullioned. The barn has a cart entry with a quoined surround, voussoirs, and a keystone, and to the left is a blocked doorway with tiestones. In the right return is a taking-in door.	II
Pigsty and pigeon house northwest of Upper Foot Farmhouse; 53.72638°N 1.95092°W	—	Late 18th century (probable)	The building is in stone with quoins and a stone slate roof. It consists of a pair of pigsties with a pigeon house above and an added cell at the rear. The building contains windows, a doorway, and a rectangular bird hole with a ledge.	II
Barn south east of Upper Quick Stavers Farmhouse; 53.70679°N 1.96160°W	—	Late 18th century	The barn is in stone with a stone slate roof and three bays. On the front is a central round-arched cart entry, a doorway converted into a window that has a re-used Tudor arched lintel with sunk spandrels, windows and another doorway, at the rear is a blocked threshing door, and in the right gable end is a round-arched owl hole.	II
Hey End Farmhouse; 53.71149°N 1.95231°W	—	1777	The farmhouse and cottage have been converted into one dwelling and incorporate earlier features. The building is in stone with quoins, and a slate roof with chamfered coped gables and finials. There are two storeys, three bays, and a rear outshut. On the front is a lean-to porch and a doorway with a plain surround, and the windows are mullioned.	II
Barn and cottage northwest of Cooper House; 53.71784°N 1.93907°W	—	1789	The barn and cottage are in stone with quoins and a stone slate roof. There are two storeys and an attic and three bays, with the cottage in the right bay. In the centre is a cart entry with quoins and a massive lintel, above which is a stone with pigeon holes, a ledge and the date, and the windows are mullioned. In the left return are slit vents, and in the left return is a taking-in door.	II
Aqueduct; 53.72220°N 1.94500°W	—	c. 1798	The aqueduct carries the Rochdale Canal and a pavement over Luddenden Brook. It is in stone, and consists of three low segmental arches on rounded piers. The aqueduct has four pilaster buttresses, a band, and a parapet with chamfered coping.	II
Canal bridge, Luddendenfoot; 53.72205°N 1.94484°W		c. 1798	The bridge carries Station Road over the Rochdale Canal, and it was widened in about 1882. The bridge is in stone, and consists of a single segmental arch. There are outer arches, the southern arch is in iron, and the northern arch is in stone with voussoirs. The parapet has triangular coping, and on each side are buttresses rising to piers with pyramidal capstones.	II
Cooper House Bridge; 53.71671°N 1.94202°W		c. 1798	The bridge carries a footpath over the Rochdale Canal. It is in stone, and consists of a single segmental arch. The bridge has quoins, voussoirs, a band, and a parapet with chamfered coping. The wing walls curve and end in piers with pyramidal caps. Steps have been added to the southwest corner.	II
Ellen Royd Bridge; 53.72587°N 1.95152°W		c. 1798	An accommodation bridge over the Rochdale Canal, it is in stone and consists of a single horseshoe arch. The bridge has a band, and a parapet with triangular coping. At the ends of the bridge are buttress pilasters rising to piers with pyramidal coping.	II
High Royd Bridge; 53.71253°N 1.92803°W		c. 1798	An accommodation bridge over the Rochdale Canal, it is in stone and consists of a single horseshoe arch. The bridge has a band, and a parapet with triangular coping. Flanking the arch are pilaster buttresses rising to piers, the coping hipped above them.	II
16 and 17 High Street, Luddenden; 53.73182°N 1.93932°W	—	c. 1800	A house with an underdwelling in stone with quoins and a stone slate roof. There are two storeys with the underdwelling below, and two bays. The openings have plain surrounds, and the windows are mullioned.	II
Acre; 53.74005°N 1.94961°W	—	c. 1800	A laithe house, the barn later converted into a cottage. It is in stone and has a stone slate roof with coped gables and kneelers. There are two storeys, the house and the barn to the left both have two bays, and to the right is an outshut. The house has a doorway with large impost blocks, and the windows are mullioned. In the barn is a segmental-arched cart entry with a keystone, a doorway with a chamfered surround, mullioned windows, and an owl hole in the gable end.	II
1, 2 and 3 Dean House Lane, Luddenden; 53.73840°N 1.93973°W	—	Late 18th to early 19th century	A row of three stone cottages with a stone slate roof. They have two storeys, and each cottage has one bay. The openings have plain surrounds, and the windows are mullioned.	II
4–8 Duke Street, Luddenden; 53.73286°N 1.94243°W	—	Late 18th to early 19th century	A terrace of five cottages in stone with a stone slate roof. There are two storeys, No. 8 has two bays, and the other cottages have one bay each. The openings have plain surrounds, and the windows are mullioned.	II
Barn northeast of Greave House; 53.72869°N 1.94294°W	—	Late 18th to early 19th century	The barn is in stone with quoins, a corrugated roof, two storeys and three bays. It contains a central round-arched cart entry with imposts and a keystone, above which is a Venetian window flanked by lunettes. In the gable ends are owl holes.	II
Pinfold, Midgley; 53.73558°N 1.96047°W		18th to early 19th century (probable)	The pinfold, which stands at a road junction, is circular, and has stone walls with triangular coping. The entrance in the southwest side has monolithic piers.	II
Stocks, Midgley; 53.73380°N 1.95705°W		18th to early 19th century (probable)	The stocks are adjacent to 61 Town Gate. They consist of two short stone round-headed piers with grooves on the inner sides holding two rails with four leg holes. There are further grooves on the tops of the piers.	II
Barn northwest of Upper Long Bottom Farmhouse; 53.71545°N 1.93591°W	—	Late 18th to early 19th century	A stone barn with a stone slate roof, two storeys and four bays. It contains on the front and at the rear central segmental-arched cart entries with tiestones, imposts and keystones. Above are Venetian windows with imposts and keystones, flanked by keyed lunettes, and in each gable end is a keyed lunette.	II
Lumb Mill; 53.75621°N 1.93007°W		1803	Originally a cotton spinning watermill, it was converted into worsted spinning in about 1833. The mill is in stone with a stone slate roof, and is on a sloping site with three storeys at the front and two at the rear. It has doorways and windows of various types. The three-storey wheelhouse contains a rare cast iron overshot suspension wheel, 36 feet (11 m) in diameter.	II*
Swamp Cottage; 53.71235°N 1.94534°W	—	1805 (probable)	A watermill, later a house, it is in millstone grit with quoins and a stone slate roof. There are two storeys, three bays, and a single-storey former wheel chamber at the rear. The doorway has tiestones, and the windows are mullioned.	II
New House Farmhouse; 53.73429°N 1.95377°W	—	1811	A laithe house in stone, with a stone slate roof that has coped gables and shaped kneelers. The house has two storeys and one bay, a gabled porch, mullioned windows, and a date plaque. The barn has two bays, and it contains a round-arched cart entry with tiestones, imposts and a keystone, a Venetian window above, and a doorway to the left. In the right return are three vents.	II
St Mary's Church, Luddenden; 53.73241°N 1.93886°W		1816–17	The church was altered in 1866 and extended in 1910. It is built in stone with a slate roof, and is in Gothic style. The church consists of a nave, a chancel, and a west tower. The tower has a south porch converted into a vestry, and a north extension. There are two stages, clasping buttresses rising to crocketed finials, a clock face on the south, and an embattled parapet.	II
Luddenden Junior School; 53.73175°N 1.93958°W	—	1825	The school was extended in 1856 and again later. It is in stone with a stone slate roof, two storeys and a basement, and sides of three and six bays. In the gable end facing the street are three-light mullioned windows in the ground floor, two Venetian windows above with imposts and keystones, and in the apex is an oculus. Along the side of the school the windows have flat heads and plain surrounds.	II
5–10 Church Hill, Luddenden; 53.73213°N 1.93970°W	—	Early 19th century	A terrace of six stone houses with a stone slate roof. There are two storeys, originally built back-to-earth, and each house has one bay. The openings have plain surrounds, the doorways have tiestones, and the windows are mullioned. To the right of No. 10 is a cart entry with living accommodation above linking it to the adjacent terrace.	II
5 and 6 Hollins Lane and barn 53.71617°N 1.95558°W	—	Early 19th century	A former farmhouse and cottage combined into one, and an attached barn in the form of a laithe house, the building is in stone with a stone slate roof. The former farmhouse has two bays, the former cottage has one, and the barn has three. The openings in the house have plain surrounds, and some of the windows are mullioned. In the barn is a central arched cart entry with tiestones, a round-arched window above, and a doorway to the right.	II
9, 10 and 11 Hollins Lane and barn 53.71640°N 1.95501°W	—	Early 19th century	Three cottages combined into one and an attached barn, the building is in stone with quoins and a stone slate roof. Each of the former cottages has one bay, there is a rear wing, and the barn has three bays. The openings in the house have plain surrounds, and some of the windows are mullioned. In the barn is a round-arched cart entry with tiestones, an arched window above, doorways at the ends, and a round-arched vent. At the rear is a threshing door, and in the right return is another vent.	II
Brown Hill; 53.71693°N 1.96755°W	—	Early 19th century	A pair of cottages and a barn, they are in stone with quoins and a stone slate roof. There are two storeys, each cottage has one bay, and the barn has two. Each cottage has a doorway with a plain surround, one has a porch, and the windows are mullioned. In the barn is a round-arched cart entry with tiestones, voussoirs and a keystone, there is a round-arched window above it and a doorway to the right, and at the rear is a threshing door.	II
Carr Well; 53.73005°N 1.93979°W	—	Early 19th century	A pair of cottages combined into one dwelling, it is in stone with a stone slate roof. There are two storeys and two bays. The openings have plain surrounds, the windows are mullioned, and each former cottage has a doorway, the left one blocked.	II
Milepost; 53.71694°N 1.94095°W		Early 19th century	The milepost is set into a wall opposite the former United Reformed Church. It is in stone and has a shaped top, and is inscribed with pointing hands and the distances to Todmorden and Halifax.	II
Mount Pleasant; 53.73489°N 1.95030°W	—	Early 19th century	Originally six back-to-back houses, later three dwellings, they are in stone and have a stone slate roof with coped gables and shaped kneelers. They are built into a hillside, and each house has three storeys to the south and two facing the road, and one bay. The doorways have plain surrounds, and the windows are mullioned.	II
Thorpe House; 53.72254°N 1.95713°W	—	Early 19th century	A stone house on a plinth, with sill bands, an eaves string course, a dentilled cornice, and a hipped stone slate roof. There are two storeys and a cellar, and five bays. Steps lead up to a Tuscan portico with a cornice and a pediment, and the doorway has a rusticated surround, a fanlight, and an archivolt. The windows are sashes, and at the rear is a stair window in an arched niche.	II
11–13 Church Hill, Luddenden; 53.73233°N 1.93959°W	—	Early to mid 19th century	A terrace of three stone houses with a stone slate roof. There are four storeys, the lower two storeys being underdwellings built back-to-earth, and each house has one bay. The openings have plain surrounds, the windows are mullioned, and garage doors have been inserted into the bottom storey.	II
1 and 2 Delph Hill Lane, Luddenden; 53.73509°N 1.94403°W	—	Early to mid 19th century	A pair of stone cottages with a stone slate roof. They have two storeys, No. 1 also has a cellar, and each cottage has one bay. The doorways and the windows, which are square, have plain surrounds.	II
1, 2 and 3 Duke Street, Luddenden; 53.73265°N 1.94238°W	—	Early to mid 19th century	A row of three stone cottages with a stone slate roof. There are two storeys and two bays. The openings have plain surrounds, and the windows are mullioned. In the apex of the right gable end is a keyed lunette.	II
2 and 4 Old Lane, Luddenden; 53.73191°N 1.93970°W		Early to mid 19th century	Three cottages and an underdwelling, later converted into two dwellings, they are in stone with a stone slate roof. There are two storeys with the underdwelling forming a basement below No. 2, and three bays. The openings have plain surrounds, and the windows are mullioned. The right doorway is approached by steps that have a cast iron handrail with wavy balusters.	II
1, 2 and 3 Town Gate, Midgley; 53.73415°N 1.95269°W	—	Early to mid 19th century	A row of three stone cottages with a stone slate roof. They have two storeys, each cottage has one bay, and behind No. 1 is a scullery wing containing a doorway. The openings have plain surrounds, and the windows are mullioned.	II
Barn southeast of Westfield Farmhouse; 53.71852°N 1.92923°W	—	Early to mid 19th century	A stone barn with a stone slate roof and three bays. In the centre is a segmental-arched cart entry with imposts, voussoirs, and a keystone, to its sides are doorways, and above it is a square opening flanked by lunettes. At the rear is a cart entry with a triangular opening above flanked by lunettes, and in the gable ends are lunette-shaped owl holes.	II
West block, Oats Royd Mill; 53.73557°N 1.94263°W		1847	The block is in stone on a plinth, with a slate roof, four storeys and a loft, and 27 bays. The tenth bay, which is gabled, contains a round-arched cart entry, with loading doors above and a hoist at the top. In the 24th bay are more loading doors, with rusticated quoins, and a date plaque. The windows have six panes.	II
Hollin Bar Farmhouse; 53.71933°N 1.95969°W	—	1849	The farmhouse, which is in early 18th-century style, is in stone and has a stone slate roof with coped gables. There are two storeys, three bays, and two outshuts at the rear. The doorway have chamfered quoined surrounds, and the doorway on the front has a Tudor arched lintel with sunken spandrels. The windows are mullioned, and on the front is a dated plaque.	II
Coach house, Oats Royd House; 53.73545°N 1.94312°W	—	Mid 19th century	The coach house is in stone with rusticated quoins, a modillion cornice, and a slate roof. There are two storeys, three bays with a pediment above the middle bay, and a single-storey bay on the left. In the centre is a round-arched carriage entry with a quoined surround and a keystone. This flanked by round-arched windows with quoined surrounds, to the right is a plain doorway, and above are three keyed oculi.	II
Former house north of Oats Royd House; 53.73549°N 1.94338°W	—	Mid 19th century	The house, later used for other purposes, is in stone with stepped eaves and a hipped stone slate roof. There are two storeys, three bays, and two outhouses on the left. The openings have plain surrounds, the windows are sashes, and on the left return are external steps leading to a blocked doorway in the upper floor.	II
Garden walls and gates, Oats Royd House; 53.73512°N 1.94269°W	—	Mid 19th century	The wall is in stone with chamfered coping, it is ramped up at the corners, and virtually surrounds the garden on four sides. On the east side is a recessed central gateway with wooden gates flanked by stone gate piers that are panelled and have pedimented caps.	II
Outbuilding and pigsty, Oats Royd House; 53.73545°N 1.94370°W	—	Mid 19th century	The outbuilding, probably a pigeon house, and the pigsty are in stone, the pigeon house has a Welsh slate roof, and the pigsty has flagstones. The pigeon house has a square plan, one storey and a loft, and one bay. It contains an arched bird hole with a ledge, a lunette, a stepped eaves band, and a pyramidal roof, and in the return is an oculus. The pigsty has two bays, a doorway with a plain surround, a lower opening, and enclosures made from flagstones on edge.	II
Chimney west of Oats Royd Mill; 53.73608°N 1.94355°W		Mid 19th century	The chimney to the west of the mill is in stone. It has a square base with a band, rising from which is a broached octagonal stack with more bands.	II
Stansfield Hall; 53.71538°N 1.93703°W	—	1855	A stone house on a plinth, that has a Welsh slate roof with coped gables and finials, and an embattled parapet on the middle bay. There are two storeys and an attic, and a symmetrical front of three bays, the outer bays wider and gabled. Steps lead up to the central doorway that has a chamfered surround and a Tudor arched head and fanlights in the spandrels. Above it are shields and a cross window with a hood mould. The outer bays each contains an embattled bay window in the ground floor, a cross window above, and a single-light window in the apex. At the rear is a three-light transomed stair window.	II
Wainstalls Church and Sunday School; 53.75078°N 1.92997°W		1857	The church and Sunday school are in sandstone and have stone slate roofs with coped gables. The church has a gabled entrance front of three bays with a coved eaves cornice. The central doorway has a plain surround and a cornice, and above it is an inscribed and dated plaque. The outer bays contain Venetian windows, and along the sides are four bays. To the right is the Sunday school that also has a gabled front.	II
Bridge near St Mary's Church; 53.73265°N 1.93895°W		1859	The bridge carries a footpath over Luddenden Brook. It is in stone and consists of a single segmental arch. The bridge has a moulded band, and a parapet with coping rising over a recessed moulded date panel. At the ends are piers on plinths, containing recessed trefoil-headed panels and with stepped pyramidal caps.	II
United Reformed Church, Manse, and Chapel House; 53.71673°N 1.94125°W		1859	The church, which has been converted into flats, is in stone with a Welsh slate roof, and is in Italianate style. The building consists of the church in the central five bays, and flanking projecting bays with pedimented gables facing the road and forming the houses. The church has one storey and a basement. The central bay contains a round-headed doorway with a fanlight, flanked by Doric pilasters and an entablature. Above it is a tower with a round-headed window in the first stage, clock faces in the second stage, and a top stage with an arched opening, an impost band, a modillioned cornice, and an ogee cap surmounted by a weathervane. In the other bays are round-headed windows with pilasters. The houses have two storeys and basements, and fronts of four bays. In each house a cantilevered balcony leads to the doorway that has a moulded cornice. The windows are sashes, in the ground floor they have flat heads, and in the upper floor round heads.	II*
Walls, gates and gate piers, United Reformed Church; 53.71678°N 1.94100°W	—	1859	Along the front of the forecourt of the church are dwarf stone walls with pointed coping and cast iron railings. There are three pairs of gate piers with cornices and pyramidal caps. The gates are also in cast iron.	II
Office building, Oats Royd Mill; 53.73526°N 1.94241°W	—	c. 1860	The office building is in stone on a plinth, with sill bands, a bracketed eaves cornice, and a hipped slate roof. The building is in Italianate style, it has two storeys, and sides of three bays. The entrance front is symmetrical, and in the centre is a round-arched doorway with pilasters, a fanlight, and an entablature with a dentilled cornice and a blocking course. The windows are sashes; in the ground floor each window has an architrave and a segmental pediment on consoles, and in the upper floor the windows are round-headed with corniced architraves. Above the doorway is a gantry.	II
Boiler house, Oats Royd Mill; 53.73607°N 1.94168°W	—	c. 1863 (probable)	The boiler house is in stone with an eaves band, a cornice, a parapet, and a slate roof There is one tall storey and four bays. The boiler house contains four round-arched openings with rusticated quoins, the left opening is a doorway.	II
East block, Oats Royd Mill; 53.73570°N 1.94150°W		1863	The building is in stone with a slate roof, and has four storeys and a basement. The gable end facing the road has three bays, and along the left return are 16 bays and nine bays recessed beyond. The main doorway is round-arched with quoins, and is flanked by smaller round-arched doorways. In the upper floor are loading doors, in the gable is a hoist, and he windows have six panes.	II
Stables and coach house, Oats Royd House; 53.73565°N 1.94313°W	—	Mid to late 19th century	The building is in stone with rusticated quoins, a modillion cornice, and a Welsh slate roof. There are two storeys and three bays, the middle bay projecting under a pediment. In the middle bay is a window, and in the left bay is a doorway with a fanlight and a window, all with segmental-arched heads and architraves. In the right bay is a round arch containing double doors and a fanlight, and in the upper floor of each bay is an oculus.	II
Steep Lane Baptist Chapel and School; 53.70938°N 1.95733°W		1873	The chapel and school are in stone with stone slate roofs, the chapel with its gabled entrance front facing the road, and the school forming a cross-wing at the rear. The chapel has two storeys and fronts of three and five bays. The entrance front has a plinth and an impost band, and is flanked by giant corner pilasters carrying a pediment and a cornice. Steps lead up to a central doorway with pilasters, a pedimented entablature, and side lights. Above the doorway is an oculus with a decorative surround, including scrolls, inscriptions and the date. The windows along the sides of the chapel and the school have square heads in the ground floor and round-arched heads in the upper floor. The school has two storeys and a basement and three bays, and above its doorway are a plaque and two stones with dates and inscriptions.	II
Wall, gate piers and gates, Steep Lane Baptist Chapel; 53.70925°N 1.95726°W		1874	The wall is in stone with chamfered coping, and is ramped up to the main gateway. There are two pairs of stone gate piers, those flanking the main entrance have plinths and pyramidal gableted caps, and those to the right are simple monoliths. The gates are in cast iron and have fleur-de-lys finials.	II
Barn and associated structures, Mill House Farm; 53.73473°N 1.94271°W	—	Late 19th century	The building is in millstone grit with roofs of slate and stone slate. It consists of a barn and pigsties, and a yard containing a rectangular stone trough, with a ramp and a wall. The barn has a cart entry and is flanked by two-storey bays, and the pigsties have attached pens.	II
Engine house and chimney, Oats Royd Mill; 53.73523°N 1.94211°W		Late 19th century	The engine house is in stone and has a hipped Welsh slate roof. There is one storey and five bays. The left bay contains a tall round-arched window with rusticated quoins, imposts and a corbelled arch, in the second bay is a doorway with a corbelled pediment, and the other bays contain tall round-arched windows. To the right is a chimney on a square base with rusticated quoins and panels, and the chimney is round with a band at the base, and above is a dentilled cornice.	II
Broadfold; 53.74109°N 1.94294°W	—	1877	A large house, later divided into flats, it is in stone with a Welsh slate Mansard roof, two storeys and a front of five bays. The entrance front has a chamfered plinth, bands, a panelled frieze, and a cornice on corbels. The middle bay projects and contains a portico with paired Ionic columns and pilasters, and an entablature with a pulvinated frieze and a modillion cornice. Inside is a door with a fanlight, flanked by arched windows. Above the portico are paired windows with a marble colonnette, and at the top is a segmental pediment containing a coat of arms and swags. The ground floor windows have segmental heads, the windows in the top floor have round heads, and all have cills on corbels and keyed archivolts.	II
Wall and pool with fountain, Broadfold; 53.74096°N 1.94237°W	—	1877 (probable)	The terrace retaining wall is in stone, it is tall, and bowed at the east. It contains recessed panels with a modillion cornice, and flanking pilasters which rise into square piers in the balustrade. The balustrade is low with vase balusters, and the cornice projects under square capstones above the piers. The pond is in the bow, it is circular, and has a raised corniced rim with scallop shell corbels. In the centre is a fountain with a stepped base and an urn.	II
Bridge over River Calder and walling, Luddendenfoot; 53.72183°N 1.94607°W		1882	The bridge carries Station Road over the River Calder. It consists of a single segmental cast iron arch, with stone piers that contain panels and have triangular coping. The parapet has fretted panels containing saltire crosses with star bosses, and a moulded top rail with central wooden finials. Stone walls extend from the bridge at both ends, and have plinths and triangular coping.	II
Carding and Combing Shed, Oats Royd Mill, wall and gateway 53.73548°N 1.94223°W	—	1885	The shed is in stone and has a roof of Welsh slate and glass, a single storey, and 17 bays. The west wall runs along the roadside, it is about 3 metres (9.8 ft) high with triangular coping, and is ramped up around a raised panel. At the left end is a rusticated gateway with an elliptical arch, a dated surround, and an entablature with a modillion cornice.	II
Reservoir, Oats Royd Mill; 53.73540°N 1.94168°W	—	c. 1885	The reservoir to the east of the Carding and Combing Shed is rectangular, and has a stone lining with flat coping. There is a pipe on the east side and a sluice on the west side.	II
Tanks and enclosures, Oats Royd Mill; 53.73538°N 1.94135°W	—	c. 1885	These consist of three square tanks and a larger rectangular enclosure in stone with flat coping. To the south are two smaller, later rectangular tanks lined with brick.	II
Weaving shed, wall and gatepiers, Oats Royd Mill; 53.73625°N 1.94150°W	—	1887	The weaving shed is in stone with a roof of Welsh slate and glass. There is one storey with 20 bays, projecting ranges, and a coped roadside wall. At the north end of the wall are rusticated gate piers with gabled capstones. The weaving shed has a segmental-arched doorway with a rusticated quoined surround, a fanlight, and a date in the tympanum.	II
Boulder Clough Bethel Chapel; 53.71160°N 1.94812°W		1897	The chapel is in stone and has a hipped slate roof with a finial. There are two storeys and seven bays with round towers at the ends. The towers have stepped transomed windows lighting the stairs, and conical roofs with finials. Between the towers is an arcade of four arches with Doric columns on panelled pedestals, plinths, and cornices. The arches are rusticated with keystones, and above them is a ramped parapet with ball finials and containing an inscription. Recessed above the parapet are mullioned and transomed windows. On each side are square windows, above is a window in the style of a Venetian window, and in the gable apex is a two-light window.	II
Wall, gatepiers, gates, railings and steps, Boulder Clough Bethel Chapel; 53.71155°N 1.94783°W	—	1897	The walls in front of the chapel are in stone with chamfered coping, and rise as piers flanking the paired gateways. Beyond the gateways two flights of steps lead up to the chapel. The railings on the walls, and the gates, are in cast and wrought iron.	II
War Memorial, Luddenden Foot; 53.72126°N 1.94568°W		1921	The war memorial, which was moved to its present site in 1951, is in stone, and consists of an obelisk on a square plinth on four steps. On the obelisk are inscriptions and the names of those lost in the First World War. Behind the obelisk is a stepped stone wall with inscribed panels and the names of those lost in the Second World War.	II
Bank Houses Cottages; 53.74786°N 1.94108°W	—	Undated	A pair of stone cottages with a stone slate roof and two storeys. Each cottage has two bays. The openings have plain surrounds, and the windows are mullioned.	II
Barn west of Bank House; 53.74788°N 1.94109°W	—	Undated	The barn is small and aisled.	II
Barn at Booth Stead Farmhouse; 53.73342°N 1.92569°W	—	Undated	The barn is in stone with a stone roof. It contains two arched entrances.	II
Barn at Raw End Farm; 53.72982°N 1.92632°W	—	Undated	A stone barn with a stone slate roof. It is probably aisled.	II
