= HX postcode area =

Postcode area within the United Kingdom

Halifax
- Postcode area
- Coordinates: 53.720°N 1.896°W
- Country: United Kingdom
- Postcode area: HX
- Postcode area name: Halifax
- Post towns: 4
- Postcode districts: 7
- Postcode sectors: 32
- Postcodes (live): 5,646
- Postcodes (total): 7,392
- Statistics as at May 2020

The HX postcode area, also known as the Halifax postcode area, is a group of seven postcode districts in England, within four post towns. These cover most of the Metropolitan Borough of Calderdale in western West Yorkshire, including Halifax, Elland, Sowerby Bridge and Hebden Bridge.

Mail for the HX postcode area is processed at Leeds Mail Centre, along with mail for the BD, HD, HG, LS, WF and YO postcode areas.

== Coverage ==
The approximate coverage of the postcode districts:

Postcode district	Post town	Coverage	Local authority area(s)
HX1	HALIFAX	Halifax Town Centre, Savile Park	Calderdale
HX2	HALIFAX	Highroad Well, (Note: may contain HX2 0AT) Illingworth, Luddenden, Luddenden Foot, Midgley, Mixenden, Mount Tabor, Norton Tower, (Note: contains HX2 0NG) Ogden, Wainstalls, Warley Town	Calderdale
HX3	HALIFAX	Akroydon, Boothtown, Copley, Hipperholme, Lightcliffe, Northowram, Norwood Green, Ovenden, Shelf, Shibden, Skircoat Green, Southowram	Calderdale
HX4	HALIFAX	Barkisland, Greetland, Holywell Green, Sowood, Stainland, West Vale	Calderdale
HX5	ELLAND	Elland, Blackley	Calderdale
HX6	SOWERBY BRIDGE	Norland, Ripponden, Rishworth, Sowerby, Sowerby Bridge	Calderdale
HX7	HEBDEN BRIDGE	Cragg Vale, Hebden Bridge, Heptonstall, Mytholmroyd, Old Town	Calderdale

== Map ==
HX postcode area map, showing postcode districts in red and post towns in grey text, with links to nearby BB, BD, HD and OL postcode areas.

== See also ==
- Postcode Address File
- List of postcode areas in the United Kingdom
