= Bradshaw, Calderdale =

Coordinates: 53.766287°N 1.881636°W

Bradshaw
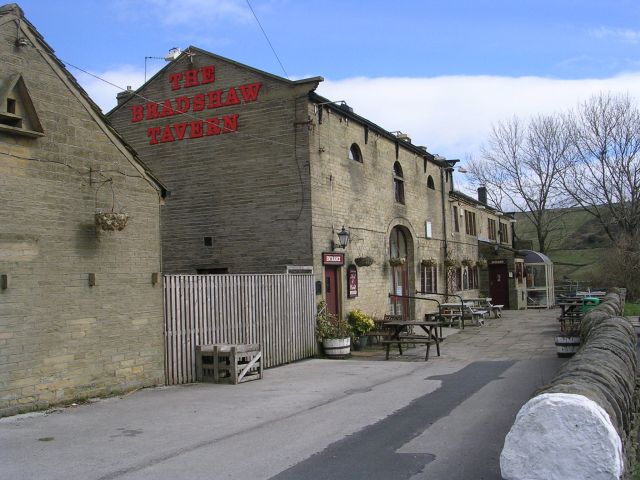
- The Bradshaw Tavern

- Location within West Yorkshire
- OS grid reference: SE079300
- Metropolitan borough: Calderdale
- Metropolitan county: West Yorkshire
- Region: Yorkshire and the Humber
- Country: England
- Sovereign state: United Kingdom
- Post town: HALIFAX
- Postcode district: HX2
- Police: West Yorkshire
- Fire: West Yorkshire
- Ambulance: Yorkshire

Bradshaw is a village within the Metropolitan Borough of Calderdale, in West Yorkshire, England.

== Buildings ==
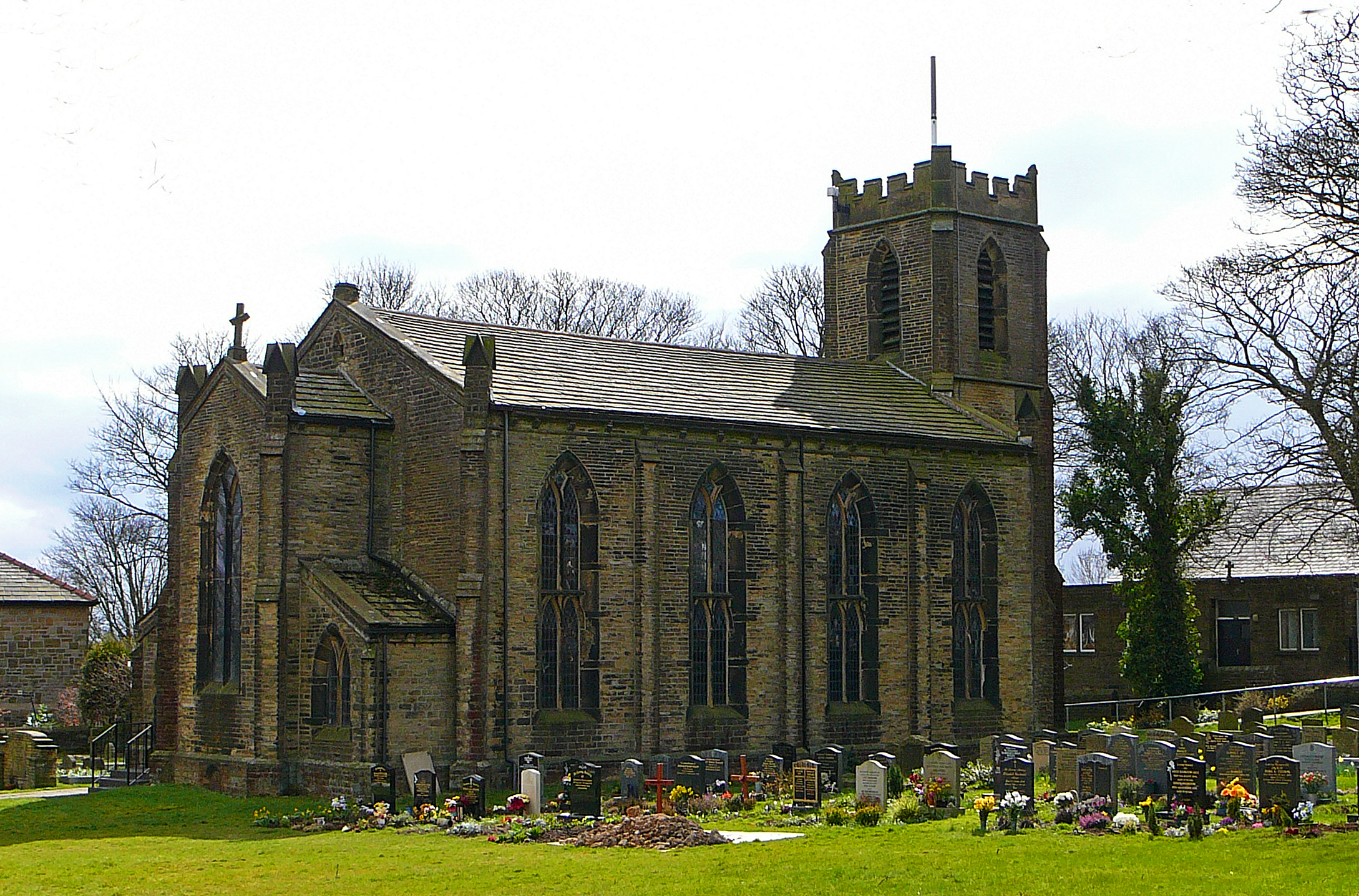
St John the Evangelist church

The parish church is dedicated to St John the Evangelist. It also has a primary school.

The church was built in 1838 at an expense of £1,200 (equivalent to £136,000 in 2023), two-thirds of which was given by Elizabeth Wadsworth who also erected a national school in the village.

== Sport ==
The village has a cricket team, Bradshaw Cricket Club who play in the Halifax Cricket League.
