= Luddenden =

District of Calderdale, West Yorkshire, England

Coordinates: 53.734871°N 1.933263°W

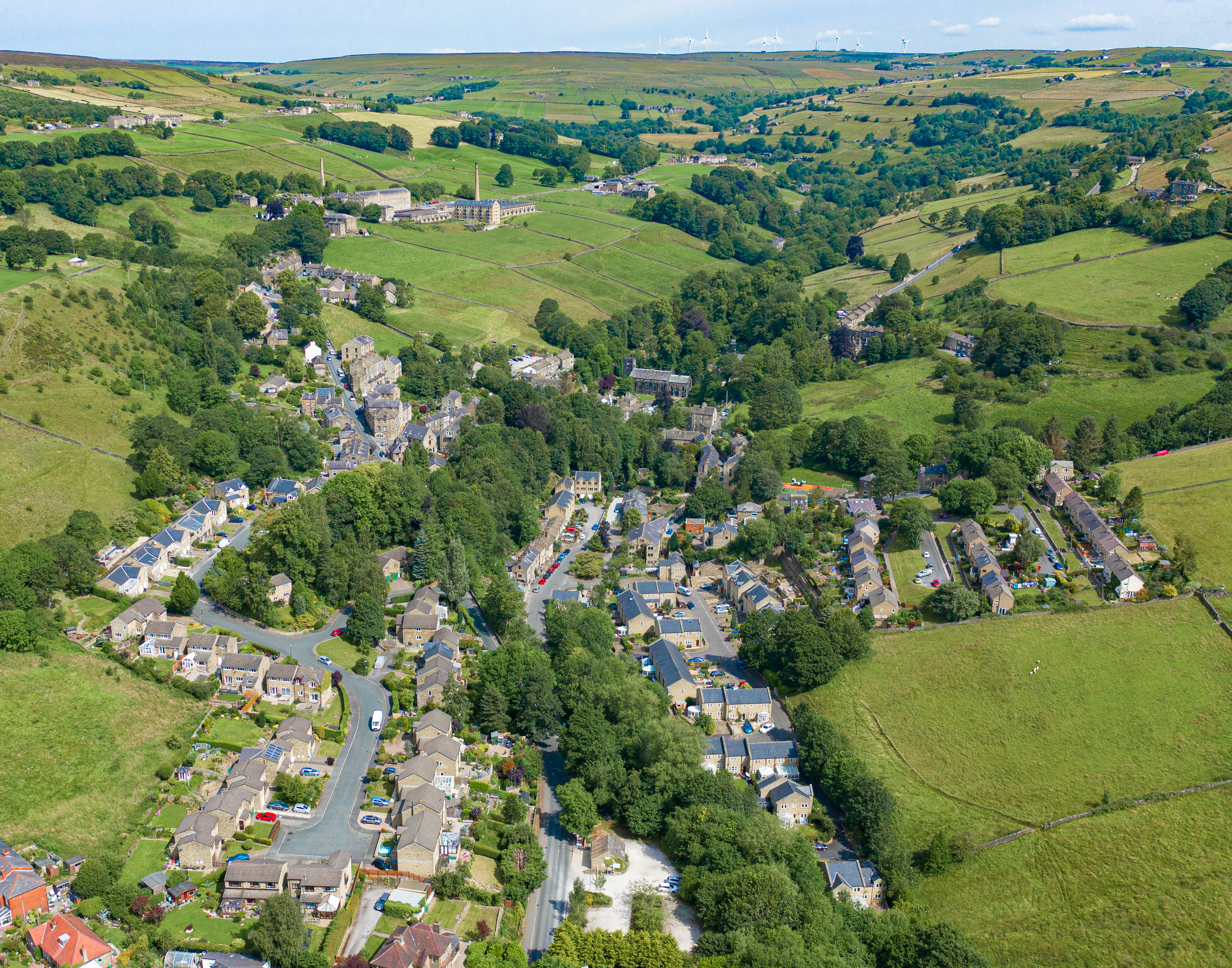
- Aerial view of Luddenden looking north towards Oats Royd Mill

- Location within West Yorkshire
- OS grid reference: SE045265
- Metropolitan borough: Calderdale
- Metropolitan county: West Yorkshire
- Region: Yorkshire and the Humber
- Country: England
- Sovereign state: United Kingdom
- Post town: HALIFAX
- Postcode district: HX2
- Dialling code: 01422
- Police: West Yorkshire
- Fire: West Yorkshire
- Ambulance: Yorkshire

Luddenden is a district of Calderdale 3.1 miles (5 km) west of Halifax on the Luddenden Brook in the county of West Yorkshire, England.

== History ==
The name means Ludd valley, or valley of the loud stream, and refers to the Luddenden Brook. An alternative meaning refers to the Celtic water god Lud, who gave his name to many water-related features. This was a Brythonic area, speaking a form of primitive Welsh, until perhaps the 9th century as a relict of the kingdom of Elmet.

The spellings Ludingdene, Loddingdene and Luddyngden are found.

The community is first mentioned in 1274 when a manorial roll in Wakefield described a corn mill operating in Luddenden to grind corn from the east side of the valley. In 1375, a corn mill was moved from Warley Town to exploit the Luddenden Brook. With the introduction of water power, many textile mills were established in the district.

The cobbled packhorse trail which runs through the village, down Old Lane from Midgley, crossing the river and on up Halifax Lane to Warley, was once the equivalent of the modern day M62, providing a major goods route through the Pennines when the main mode of transport was packhorses. This started to change from 1760 as the government approved a Turnpike road to be constructed through the Calder Valley. In the 17th century the village, along with the other locations in the Luddenden Brook valley, became prosperous through the worsted industry. To enable water to be supplied to the 11 mills in the valley, the Cold Edge Dam Company was formed to build the reservoirs at the head of the valley.

The area, alongside the West Yorkshire village of Bramham, West Yorkshire was used for filming external scenes in the 1980s ITV Yorkshire Television situation comedy series In Loving Memory, starring Dame Thora Hird and Christopher Beeny. In recent years scenes from Happy Valley starring Sarah Lancashire and Gentleman Jack starring Suranne Jones have been filmed in and around the village

In May 1989, an extreme rainfall event was recorded at 7.6 inches (192 mm) over the course of two hours at the Walshaw Dean rainfall gauge. The resultant flood, one of the worst seen in Calderdale, drove a huge amount of water through the village which damaged roads, houses and industrial premises. The 1 in a 1,000 event took over six months to recover from.

The village has a church "St Mary's", and a very old pub "The Lord Nelson", both of which are Grade II listed. The pub is where Branwell Brontë once drank and the pub itself is asserted to have established the first public library in one of the upstairs rooms.

In recent years the village has reestablished the position of Village Mayor, the role is primarily about raising funds for local charitable causes and investment in the village.

The village was a regular entrant in the Yorkshire in Bloom competition from 1998, and won an award every time they entered winning five gold and three silver medals up until 2013. The village was also an entrant in Britain in Bloom, and was the out right winner in the village category on one occasion receiving a gold medal. The village no longer enter competitions but still has a very active bloom team that keeps the village looking good.

There is also a digital television and analogue radio transmitter for the local area, it broadcasts BBC National Radio and BBC Radio Leeds to the South and East to Halifax, Sowerby Bridge and as far south as Rishworth. The television services are directed North, West and South.

== Governance ==
The settlement is part of the Luddendenfoot ward of the Metropolitan borough of Calderdale, part of the Metropolitan county of West Yorkshire.

== See also ==
- Listed buildings in Luddendenfoot
