= Cragg Vale =

Village in West Yorkshire, England

Coordinates: 53.698937°N 1.993904°W

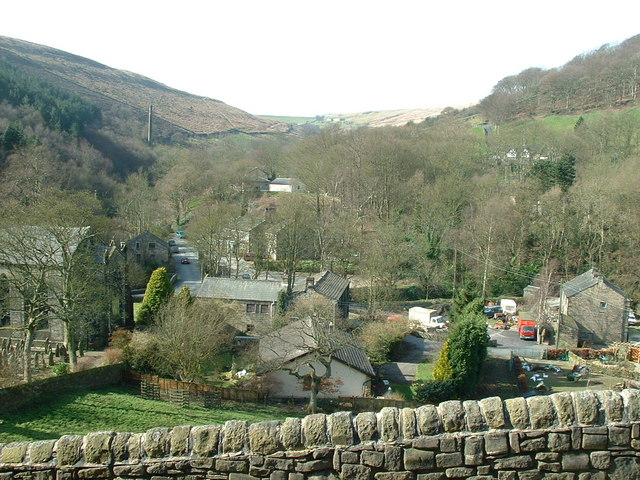

- Location within West Yorkshire
- Population: 650 (2001)
- OS grid reference: SE005225
- Civil parish: Hebden Royd
- Metropolitan borough: Calderdale
- Metropolitan county: West Yorkshire
- Region: Yorkshire and the Humber
- Country: England
- Sovereign state: United Kingdom
- Post town: HEBDEN BRIDGE
- Postcode district: HX7
- Dialling code: 01422
- Police: West Yorkshire
- Fire: West Yorkshire
- Ambulance: Yorkshire
- UK Parliament: Calder Valley

Cragg Vale is a village in Calderdale, West Yorkshire, England, located south of Mytholmroyd on the B6138 road which joins the A58 and the A646. The village is part of Luddendenfoot Ward of Calderdale Council.

== History ==
=== Early days ===
There is evidence of human activity on the Yorkshire moors around Cragg from c. 10,000 BC. Flints, not native to West Yorkshire, have been found on Blackstone and Midgley Moors – implying movement of peoples and long-distance trade by this period at the latest.

Later flint spear heads and arrow tips, hunting weapons, have been found in quantity over Manshead and Rishworth moors. So we know Mesolithic tribes hunted around both the Turvin and Cragg areas.

Hunters were constrained to move across the high reaches, which were less heavily wooded, rather than the steep sided valleys – but to cross from top to top they must descend to ford the streams and rivers of the valley bottoms.

Although prehistoric and later peoples were responsible for extensive tree felling and land clearance this did not create the peat moors above Cragg Vale.

Around 5000 BC the climate changed and became much wetter and remained so for over 2,000 years. Soil deteriorated as minerals were washed away, and the land around Cragg became waterlogged. The trees and plant life died away and the peat moors on the tops were created.

We know from place naming and language conventions that ancient Britons (the Brigantes tribe), Anglo Saxons, Vikings, and Romans had a large input into the area of Cragg.

=== Romans ===
The Romans left little except their (disputed) road over Blackstone Edge as evidence – but there would have been extensive forced population relocation as the engineers and troops pushed forwards.

We know the Romans made a pact with the Brigantes tribe, and that this whole area of West Yorkshire – the centre of the ancient kingdom of Elmet – was ruled by them. Little remains of Elmet but the ancient names. Close by Cragg lies the hamlet of Warley, and not much further away to the west lies Walsden – both names relate to the 'Walh' – a term used for the Britons. This implies a residual British culture after the invasion and takeover by the victorious Anglo Saxons

The Britons were annexed by the Romans by 100 AD, and c. 700 AD the Saxons arrived. Around 1000 AD, the Vikings gained control. They in turn were overcome by the Normans by 1100 AD. Leading into the Medieval period

The primary industry was agriculture, but iron was smelted too, good timber and charcoal was produced, and grain was milled. Local craftsmen produce some cloth, make clothing, farm implements, and utensils while others provide transport services and labour.

Cragg was part of a township called Cruttonstall (later called Erringden) and adjacent to the township of Sowerby (Sorebi from the Norse). All the land between Cragg and Sowerby was gradually cleared of dense forest to make way for agriculture as the population grew.

The land to the West, and a large part of Cragg Vale, was soon to be partly cleared and 'impaled' as a huge deer park and royal hunting ground.

=== Medieval ===
In late Medieval times the deer park fell into disrepair and was finally dispaled. Knights no longer took the rough ride down The Withens toward Wakefield tourney. The wild boars, stags and wolves were in serious decline and sheep were now the major local industry.

=== 18th and 19th century ===
During the late 18th century, the area was the home of a band of counterfeiters known as the Cragg Vale Coiners.

Having a good supply of water from the moors, Cragg was always a likely home for industry based on water power. From mid-1700 onwards, water then steam power, and combined water wheel and steam engines dominated the valley with the cloth mills.

There were a number of families involved in mill ownership during this time. Sutcliffes, Greenwoods, and Hinchliffes amongst others. Yet in 1758 there were but 3 mills in Cragg. A paper mill (just up from and on the opposite side of the main road the Robin Hood Inn), a corn mill (at Hoo Hole), and a mill for fulling woven cloth from the farms.

The water driven mills that flourished at Turvin, Marshaw Village (by the Hinchliffe Arms pub) and on Elphin Brook (down Cragg Vale) posed no real threat to local farm based weavers at that time.

However, from 1808 onwards things began to change alarmingly for the worse. Steam power was heavily adopted from around 1805 on. Child labour became the norm. Now began the mill owners infamous abuses.

At one time or another from 1740 to the early 20th century there have existed around 11 mills in Cragg.

Turvin, Victoria, and Pepper Bank mills on Turvin Brook; Marshaw (opposite the Hinchliffe Arms) with New and Vale mills in Withens Clough. Next down Elphin Brook were Castle, Paper (opposite the Robin Hood Inn), Cragg, Hoo Hole, and Scar Bottom mill (Mytholmroyd). By the 1820s these were said to be no place for "any decent human, let alone the children of the poor".

"If there is one place in England that needed legislative interference it is this place; for they work 15 and 16 hours a day frequently, and sometimes all night. Oh! it is a murderous system and the mill owners are the pest and disgrace of society...!"

It is on record that children died at their work in the mills of Cragg. Died from long hours and harsh treatments handed out. While the mill owners William Greenwood ('Old Billy Hard Times') and the Hinchliffe family amassed their fortunes. It took the 1833 factory act just to begin to address the appalling abuse of child labour and workers

A turnpike known as the Mytholmroyd Bridge & Blackstone Edge Turnpike, and also as the Cragg Vale Turnpike was established in 1815:

"... to open a better and more easy communication than there is at present between the very populous and manufacturing town or villages of Hebden Bridge, Heptonstall, Mytholmroyd and other places in the vicinity thereof with Rochdale, Manchester and Oldham ..."

The road runs from County Bridge, Mytholmroyd and up Cragg Road to link with the Halifax to Blackstone Edge turnpike over Blackstone Edge to Rochdale. Tolls were discontinued on 1 November 1873.

== Governance ==
The village is part of the Luddendenfoot ward of the Metropolitan borough of Calderdale, part of the Metropolitan county of West Yorkshire.

== Current day ==
Although Cragg Vale is a small linear village, it has two pubs The Robin Hood Inn and the Hinchliffe Arms, and a Caravan and Motorhome Club Site. In the last few years the village has expanded with a children's nursery called The Ark, a recording studio Aspire Technology being added to the village. The main business areas in Cragg Vale are the Top Land Country Business Park, as well as the Craggs Country Business Park further up the valley. Local enterprises include The Little Valley Brewery which produces such locally named brews as Cragg Vale Bitter, Stoodley Stout, Hebdens Wheat & Tod's Blonde among others, Zikodrive Motor Controllers, Visiosound and Vocation Brewery. In April 2025, a shed called The Rusty Hen was opened in a field.

Today, Cragg Vale has a population of about 650. It is located at the start of arguably the longest continuous gradient in England (after perhaps Pishill in The Chilterns)- 968 feet over 5.5 miles There is an annual bike race up it; this is a hill climb and normally run by the Yorkshire road club. The record is currently at 14:19 for men and 18:47 for women. In July 2014, the hill formed part of the route of the 2014 Tour de France.

== See also ==
- Listed buildings in Hebden Royd
