= Sowerby, West Yorkshire =

Village in West Yorkshire, England

Coordinates: 53.707234°N 1.935608°W

Sowerby
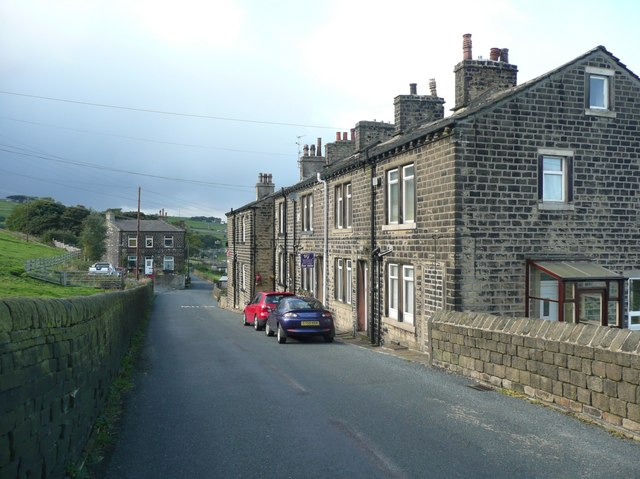
- Pinfold Lane, Sowerby

- Location within West Yorkshire
- OS grid reference: SE042234
  - London: 170 mi (270 km) SSE
- Metropolitan borough: Calderdale
- Metropolitan county: West Yorkshire
- Region: Yorkshire and the Humber
- Country: England
- Sovereign state: United Kingdom
- Post town: SOWERBY BRIDGE
- Postcode district: HX6
- Dialling code: 01422
- Police: West Yorkshire
- Fire: West Yorkshire
- Ambulance: Yorkshire
- UK Parliament: Calder Valley

Sowerby (/ˈsɔːrbi/ SOR-bi) is a village in the Calderdale district, in West Yorkshire, England. It lies in the Pennines, contiguous with Sowerby Bridge, 3.7 miles (6.0 km) west-southwest of Halifax.

== History ==
Historically a part of the West Riding of Yorkshire, Sowerby appears in the Domesday Book of 1086, and was an important settlement long before Halifax began to dominate. The ancient district of Sowerbyshire, a stretch of forest centred on the town leading down the Ryburn and Calder valleys and almost up to Halifax, was a Royal chase.

The name Sowerby is made up from the Norse Sor for sour and suffixed with by representing a parished area. The local pronunciation follows the original Norse. (saw+bi).

A local legend described a castle in Sowerby, and its presence was confirmed by excavations on 'Castle Hill' at the high end of the old town in the early 1900s by the Halifax Antiquarian Society. Archaeologists uncovered the foundations of a Norman motte-and-bailey castle.

== Governance ==
Sowerby was the centre of the Sowerby parliamentary constituency until the 1983 general election, when the constituency was expanded and renamed Calder Valley. Sowerby now falls within the Calderdale Ward of Ryburn.

Sowerby was formerly a township in the parish of Halifax, in 1894 "Sowerby Bridge" civil parish was formed from Warley, Skircoat, Sowerby and Norland, in 1894 it also became an urban district under the name "Sowerby", on 1 April 1926 the parish was renamed to "Sowerby", on 1 April 1937 the parish was abolished to form Sowerby Bridge and Ripponden. On 1 April 1937 the district was abolished to form Sowerby Bridge Urban District and Ripponden Urban District. In 1931 the parish had a population of 14,680.

== Landmarks ==
Once home to many chapels and churches of several Christian denominations, the Anglican St Peter's Church is of architectural interest and the main focus of religious worship in the town.

== Notable people ==
John Tillotson, 'The people's priest', Archbishop of Canterbury between 1691 and 1693, was a native of Sowerby. A statue of Tillotson exists in St Peter's Church and an avenue is named after him in the lower end of the town.

The summer home of the former MP for Great Grimsby, Austin Mitchell, was situated in the town. The nearby mansion of Field House was the seat of the Stansfeld family, who contributed much to the local community, including building St Peter's Church. Sowerby Hall, close to the church, was built by Josiah Horton in 1650 and the Rawson family, who owned the Brockwell estate at the lower end of St Peter's Avenue, contributed to the construction of several notable buildings in the town during the 18th century.

== See also ==
- Listed buildings in Ryburn
- Sowerby, North Yorkshire
