= Midgley =

Coordinates: 53.734244°N 1.955638°W

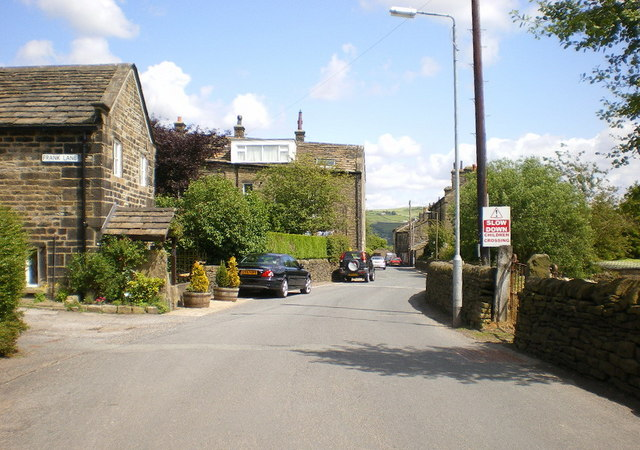
- Towngate, Midgley

- Location within West Yorkshire
- OS grid reference: SE030264
  - London: 170 mi (270 km) SSE
- Metropolitan borough: Calderdale
- Metropolitan county: West Yorkshire
- Region: Yorkshire and the Humber
- Country: England
- Sovereign state: United Kingdom
- Post town: HALIFAX
- Postcode district: HX2
- Dialling code: 01422
- Police: West Yorkshire
- Fire: West Yorkshire
- Ambulance: Yorkshire
- UK Parliament: Calder Valley

Midgley (/ˈmɪdʒli/) is a hill-top village in Calderdale, West Yorkshire, England. It is situated approximately 12 miles (20 km) east from Burnley and 4 miles (6 km) west-north-west of Halifax, and just north of the A646 road. Nearby villages are Mytholmroyd 1 mile (1.6 km) to the west-south-west, and Hebden Bridge 2.5 miles (4.0 km) to the west-north-west.

The name Midgley derives from the Old English mycglēah meaning 'midge wood or clearing'.

Midgley has a social committee to arrange events such as open gardens, village fetes, parties, quiz nights and wine tasting. A previous Co-op store has been refurbished to become a shop and community room staffed by volunteers; it opened in February 2010.

Local primary education is provided by Midgley School.

== Governance ==
The village is part of the Luddendenfoot ward of the metropolitan borough of Calderdale, part of the Metropolitan county of West Yorkshire.

Midgley was formerly a township in the parish of Halifax, in 1866 Midgley became a separate civil parish, in 1894 Midgley became an urban district, on 1 April 1939 the urban district and parish were abolished, the urban district was merged with Hepton Rural District and the parish was merged with Wadsworth. In 1931 the parish had a population of 1882.

== See also ==
- Listed buildings in Luddendenfoot
