= Norland, West Yorkshire =

Village in West Yorkshire, England

Coordinates: 53.699729°N 1.901942°W

Norland
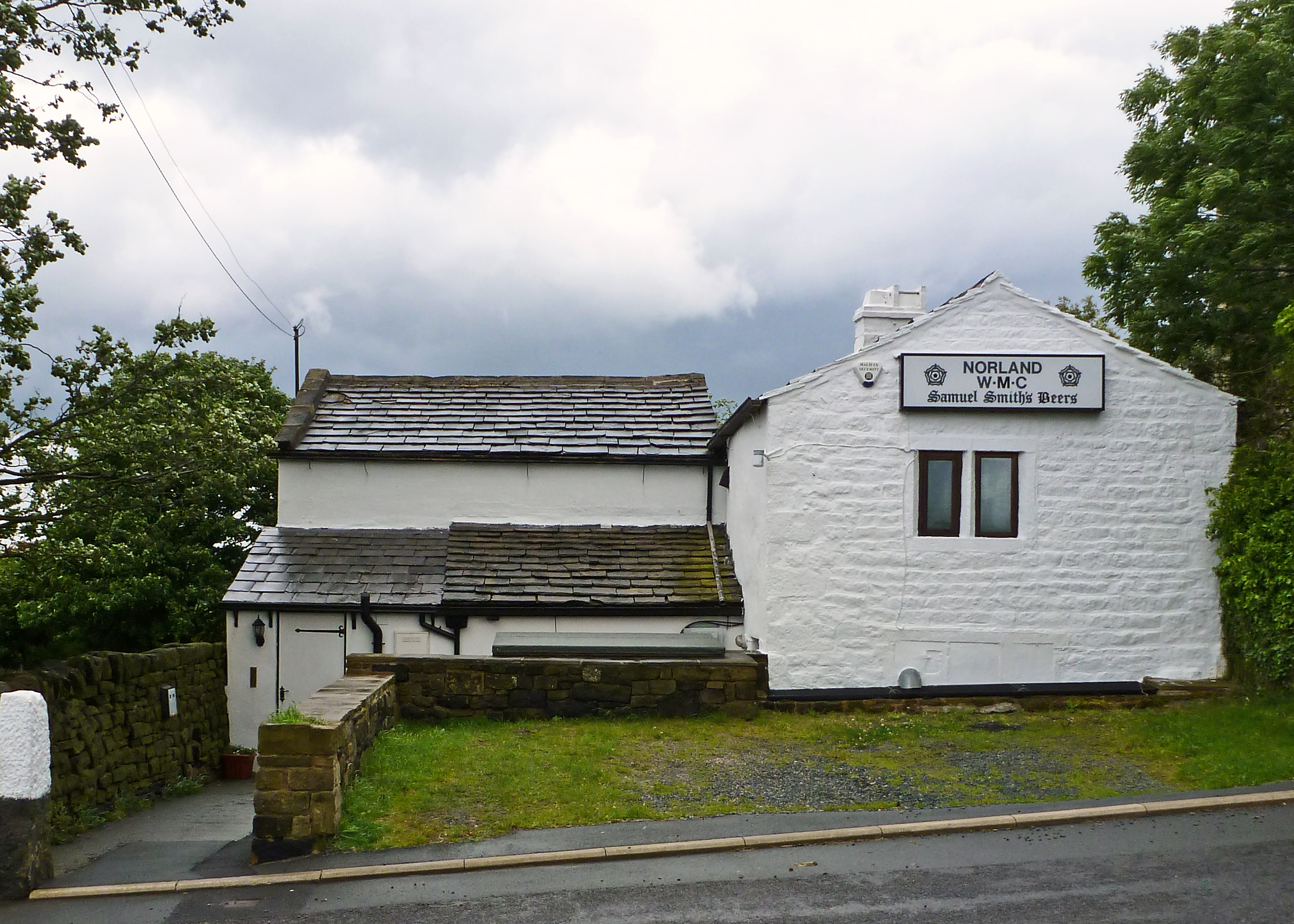
- Norland Working Men's Club

- Location within West Yorkshire
- OS grid reference: SE065225
- Metropolitan borough: Calderdale
- Metropolitan county: West Yorkshire
- Region: Yorkshire and the Humber
- Country: England
- Sovereign state: United Kingdom
- Post town: SOWERBY BRIDGE
- Postcode district: HX6
- Dialling code: 01422
- Police: West Yorkshire
- Fire: West Yorkshire
- Ambulance: Yorkshire
- UK Parliament: Calder Valley

Norland is a dispersed village south of Sowerby Bridge, in the metropolitan borough of Calderdale in West Yorkshire, England.

== History ==
Historically part of the West Riding of Yorkshire, the settlement dates back to the 13th century when it consisted of timber-framed farmhouses on the hillsides above the valleys of the Calder and Ryburn rivers. They were replaced by stone houses in the 17th and 18th centuries and housed workers in the woollen industry that developed at this time. As the industry thrived, some houses built by yeoman farmers were substantial such as Lower Old Hall (dated 1634) and Fallingworth Hall (dated 1642). Norland Hall, lower down on the hillside near Milner Royd, was typical of an older timber-framed building encased in stone in the late 17th century. In 1911 it was struck by lightning and dismantled in 1914. The American newspaper magnate William Randolph Hearst bought the stones in 1922 with the intention of re-building the hall in the USA. However, his plan came to nothing and eventually material was incorporated into a chapel in San Simeon, California, in 1968.

The village church, St Luke's, opened in 1866. Three other former places of worship, Mount Pleasant Methodist Chapel (1819–1962), Mount Zion Chapel and Bethel Baptist Chapel (1865–?), are now private residences.

The primary school was built as a Sunday school in 1871 and opened as a Church of England day school in January 1872. It has since been extended in 1894 and 2003.

The war memorial was erected in 1920 and the park around it created four years later on the site of the village pinfold. In 2000 a millennium sundial was added and a time capsule buried by the children of Norland School.

Norland was formerly a township in the parish of Halifax, in 1866 Norland became a separate civil parish, on 1 April 1937 the parish was abolished and merged with Sowerby Bridge. In 1931 the parish had a population of 1128.

== Norland Moor ==
Norland Moor (approx. 250 acres) above the village is an example of heather moorland rising to 932 feet (284 m) at the trig point at the southern end. There is evidence of ancient use with a small number of standing stones, ditches and banks having been identified. The Ladstone, a large outcrop near the trig point, has been linked with Druids as a possible place of ritual sacrifice (Celtic llad = kill or cut). The moor bears the scars of quarrying carried out chiefly in the 18th and 19th centuries on its north-western edge. The moor has been a place of recreation for generations but it has attracted illegal gambling dens and prize fights.

Previously owned by Lord Savile, a large section of the moor was auctioned in 1932 to pay death duties. It was purchased by Mr Francis Longbottom for £250. Subsequently, the Parish Council launched an appeal (which raised £373 in eleven days) and Norland Moor passed into its care for the benefit of the local population. In 1937 control passed to Sowerby Bridge Urban District Council and in 1974 to Calderdale Metropolitan Borough Council. In 2002 Norland Moor was designated a Local Nature Reserve (LNR). In 2011 moves were in place to create a Friends of Norland Moor group so that local interests are respected in the moor's management.

== Norland today ==
Norland has an estimated population of about 600 compared to about 1,500 in the mid–19th century. Most people commute out of the village to work. It no longer has any shops but has a public house, "The Moorcock", and the Norland Working Men's Club, reputedly one of the smallest working men's clubs in the country. The "Blue Ball", dating back to at least the 1820s, closed in December 2009, and the "Hobbit" (previously the "West Bottom Tavern") closed in 2011. The Hobbit has reopened.

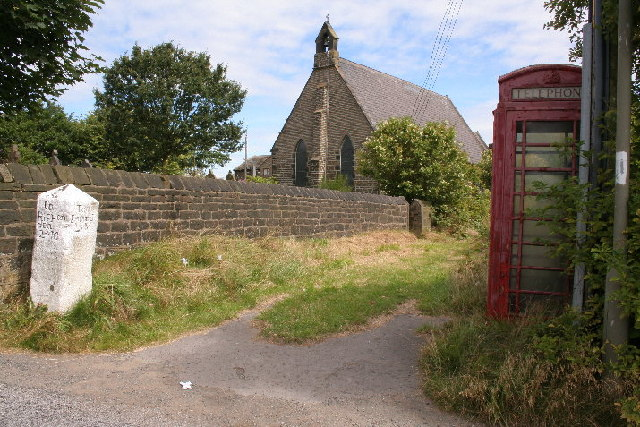
St Luke's Church, Norland

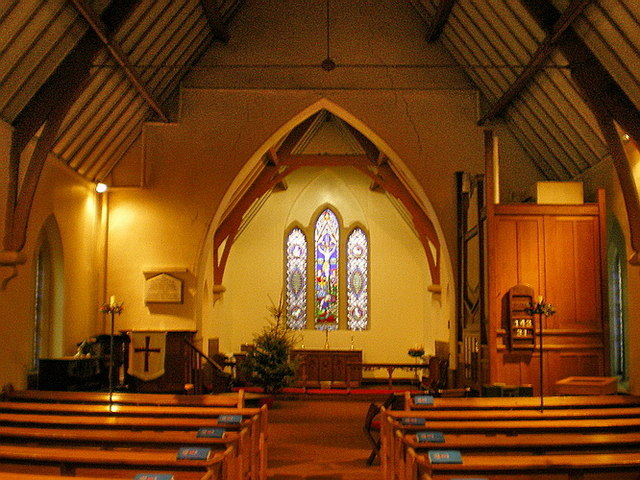
St Luke's Church, Norland (internal view)

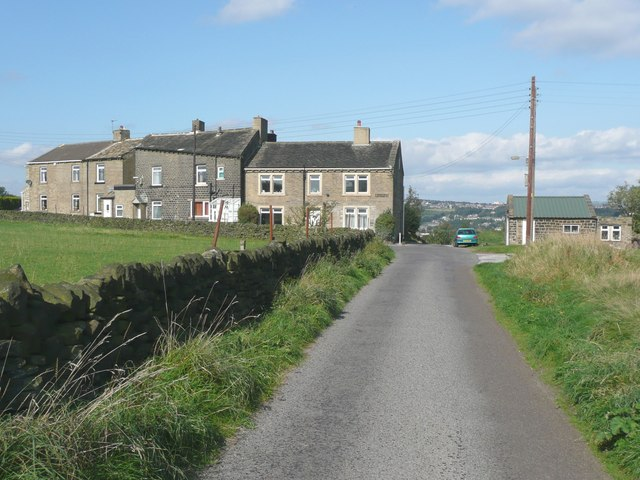
New Clough Road, Norland

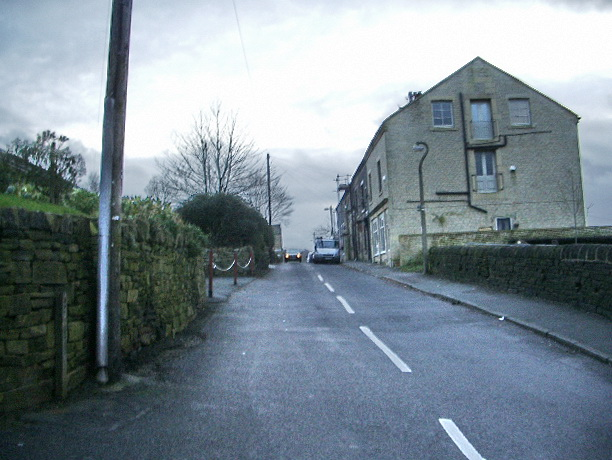
Harper Royd Lane

== Scarecrow festival ==
The annual scarecrow festival was started by a millennium committee for the village in 1999. It takes place around the first weekend in September. The theme for 2016 was Books. The theme for 2019 was “Space and all things Sci-fi” and for 2022 the theme was "Children's Favourites": all the scarecrows were built with this theme in mind.

== See also ==
- Listed buildings in Greetland and Stainland
