= Skircoat Green =

Coordinates: 53.702348°N 1.863621°W

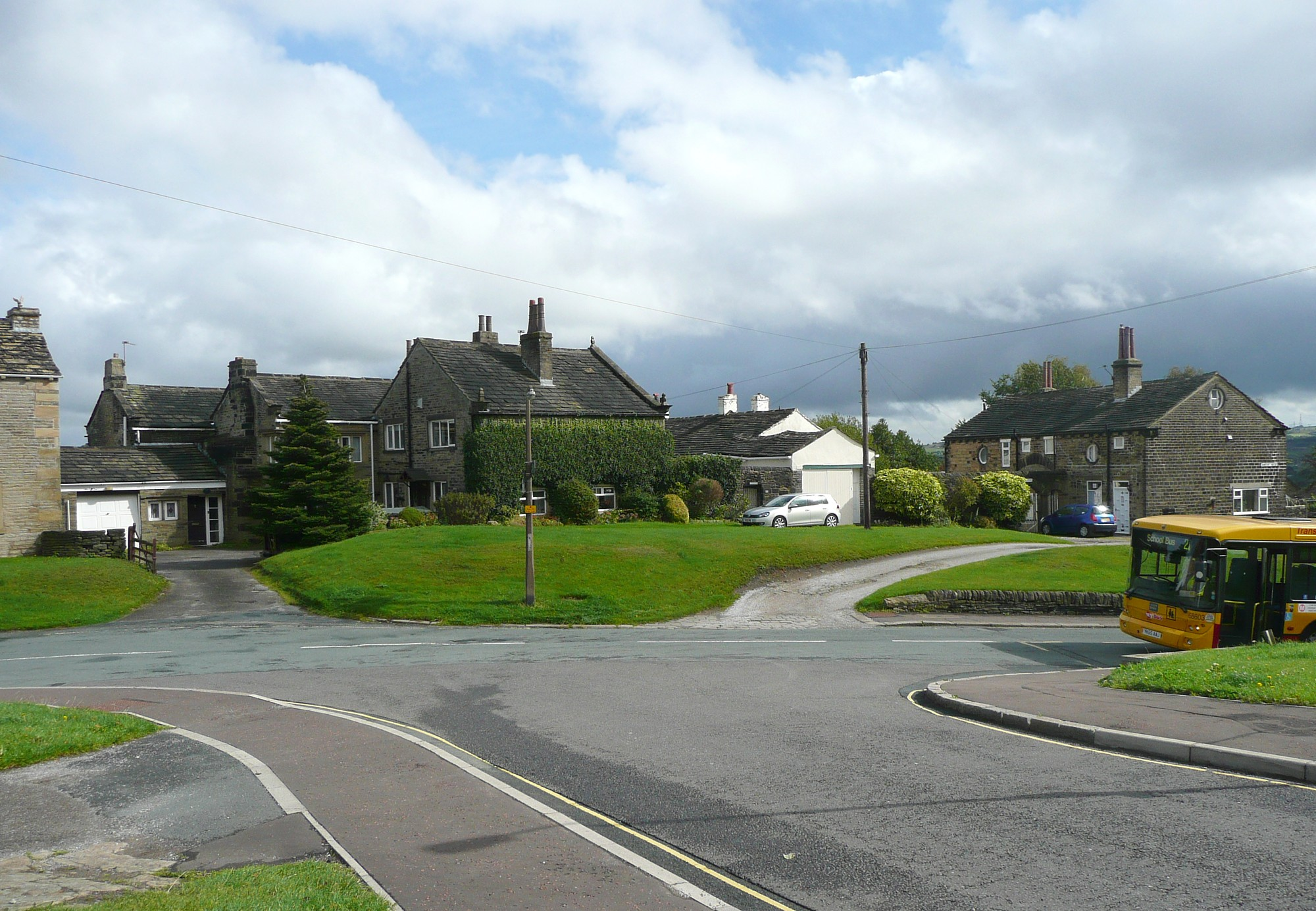
- Village green

- Location within West Yorkshire
- Population: 12,712 (Skircoat Ward. 2011)
- OS grid reference: SE091228
- Metropolitan borough: Calderdale
- Metropolitan county: West Yorkshire
- Region: Yorkshire and the Humber
- Country: England
- Sovereign state: United Kingdom
- Post town: HALIFAX
- Postcode district: HX3
- Police: West Yorkshire
- Fire: West Yorkshire
- Ambulance: Yorkshire

Skircoat Green (/ˈskɜːrkət/) is an area to the south of Halifax, West Yorkshire, England. Skircoat is a ward of the Borough of Calderdale whose population at the 2011 Census was 12,712.

In the 13th century, the land was granted to the Earl Warren, and then passed to the Savile family. This was an independent township before being absorbed by the Borough of Halifax in 1892. The name was originally Schircotes and means building on the rocks. The Skircoat Green Area of Halifax is north of Salterhebble and is one of the most expensive areas of Halifax.

== Schools ==
The main school in the Skircoat Green area is All Saints CofE J&I School. It provides primary education from Reception through to Year 6 and is consistently ranked as one of the best primary schools in Calderdale.

== Amenities ==
Skircoat Green has a relatively wide variety of shops on its 'high street'. These include the library, two convenience stores, one of which is also the local post office, two bakeries, a deli, a dentist, two public houses, three hairdressers', one clothes shop, an estate agents, a solicitors, a curtain shop, a takeaway, a fish and chip shop, a dry cleaners and a tanning salon among others.

== Spring Hall ==
Spring Hall, in Mansion Lane, is a large Gothic Revival building which was rebuilt and restyled in 1871 by William Swinden Barber for Tom Holdsworth. As of 2014 it houses Calderdale Register Office.
