= Wainstalls =

Coordinates: 53.752°N 1.931°W

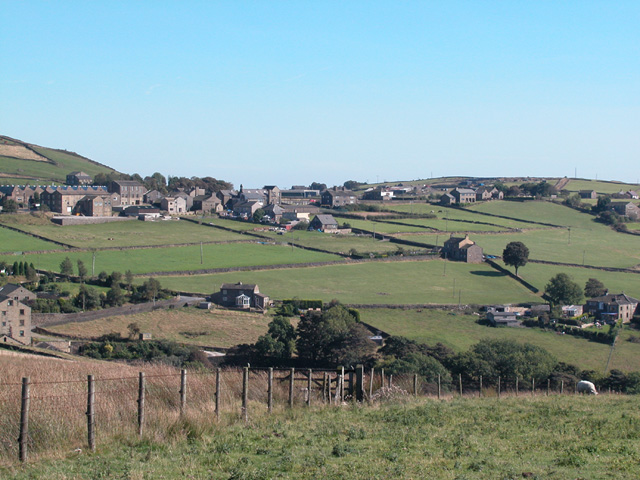

Wainstalls is a village near Halifax, in the Calderdale district of West Yorkshire, England. The area is rural and much of the area is farmland. Wainstalls is in the HX postcode area and in the HX2 postcode district and the Luddendenfoot ward of Calderdale Council.

The area contains Wainstalls School, where Hannah Cockroft, a British paralympian who won two golds at The London 2012 Paralympic Games, studied.

The two pubs in Wainstalls are The Crossroads Inn and The Cat-I-th'Well.

Wainstalls currently has a factory right in the centre which currently houses Heights (UK) Ltd., a manufacturing company. In the late nineteenth century, the mill owner, James Calvert, arranged for 250 orphans from Liverpool to come and work in his mill. According to a local historian, they were well-treated and descendants of them still live in the area. They became known as the Wainstall waifs.
