= Warley Town =

Coordinates: 53.719696°N 1.913602°W

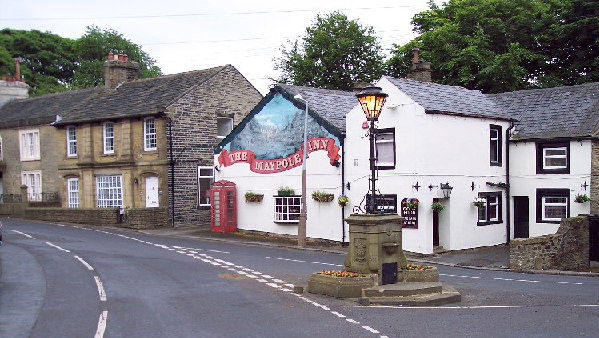
- Maypole Inn, Warley Town, looking east

- Location within West Yorkshire
- Population: 12,215 (Warley Ward. 2011)
- OS grid reference: SE057248
- Metropolitan borough: Calderdale
- Metropolitan county: West Yorkshire
- Region: Yorkshire and the Humber
- Country: England
- Sovereign state: United Kingdom
- Post town: HALIFAX
- Postcode district: HX2
- Police: West Yorkshire
- Fire: West Yorkshire
- Ambulance: Yorkshire

Warley Town is a settlement near Halifax, in the Calderdale district, in the county of West Yorkshire, England. Warley is a ward of Calderdale. The population of this ward as taken at the 2011 Census was 12,215.

== History ==
Warley Town was listed in the Domesday Book as Werlafeslei.

Warley township, one of 23 townships in the ancient parish of Halifax, was also one of the biggest, stretching as far as Luddenden and what was to become Sowerby Bridge. The township consisted of many tiny settlements essentially based on the local farmsteads, places such as Lane End, Warley Edge, Winterburn Hill, Cliff Hill and Warley itself.

Warley was formerly a township in the parish of Halifax, in 1866 Warley became a separate civil parish, in 1894 Warley became an urban district, in 1900 the urban district was abolished and the parish was abolished and merged with Halifax on 9 November 1900. In 1891 the parish had a population of 9249.

Warley remained a small settlement until the beginning of the 18th century. Then the consolidation of the Cliff Hill estate into a major land holding, coupled with the establishment of the Congregational chapel, formed the core, around which the present village grew. In 1977 the chapel was closed and converted into housing now called Chantry House.

In front of the chapel, cottages were built for agricultural workers as well as larger houses for local businessmen who preferred to live in the country away from the smog of Halifax.

Wilfred Pickles and his wife Mabel were residents of Warley for many years, and Wilfred could occasionally be seen enjoying a pint of Webster's beer in the village pub, The Maypole. During the late 1960s, and 1970s The Maypole was run by Jack Wilkinson and his wife June; Jack had previously been a well-known rugby league player and had played for Wakefield Trinity and Halifax rugby league football clubs. He also appeared as himself on the rugby pitch in the film This Sporting Life.

The writer Dr Phyllis Bentley was also a famous and long-term Warley resident.

Patrick Brontë, father of the writers Charlotte, Emily and Anne Brontë, and of Branwell Brontë, lived for a time in Warley Town in a house called "The Grange" next to the congregational chapel. The Church of St John the Evangelist was completed in 1878.

As part of British Telecom's ‘Adopt a Kiosk’ programme, the Warley Community Association adopted the disused BT telephone box and transformed it into a museum of local history, said to be the smallest museum in England.

== Sports ==
Warley Town is home to the amateur football team Warley Rangers. Warley Cricket Club plays in the Halifax Cricket League.

== See also ==
- Listed buildings in Warley, West Yorkshire
