= Rishworth (disambiguation) =

Rishworth is a village in Calderdale, West Yorkshire, England.

Rishworth may also refer to:

== People ==
- Amanda Rishworth (born 1978), Australian politician
- Percy Rishworth (1869–1930), New Zealand politician
- Samuel Rishworth, English abolitionist and Providence Island councillor
- Stephen Rishworth (born 1980), English footballer

== Rishworth, England ==
- Rishworth branch, a railway line
- Rishworth railway station, a terminus of the Rishworth branch
- Rishworth School, a co-educational independent school

== See also ==
- Rushworth (disambiguation)
