= Triangle railway station =

Disused railway station in West Yorkshire, England

Triangle
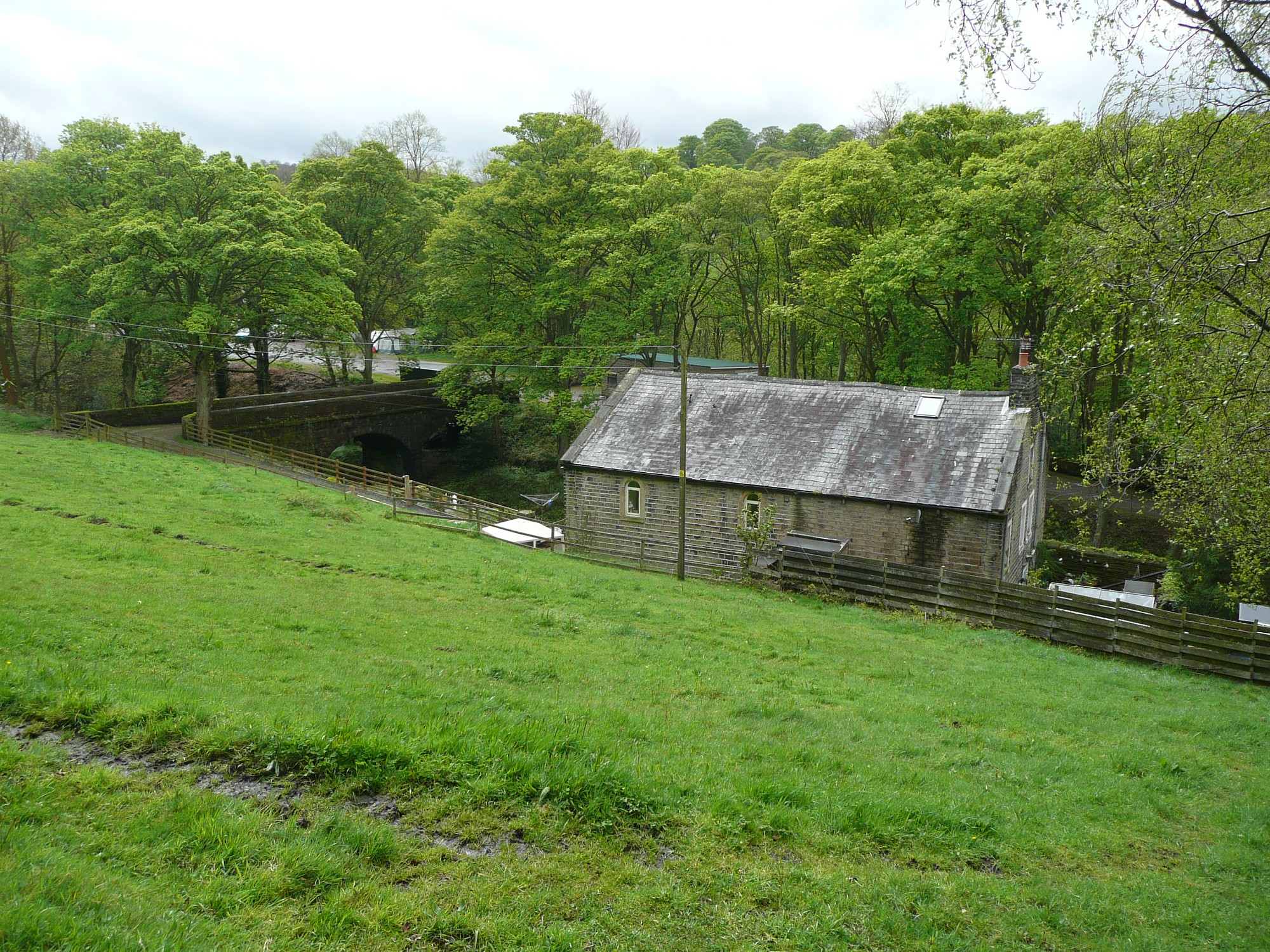
- Station house

General information
- Location: Triangle, Calderdale; England
- Coordinates: 53.6957°N 1.9322°W
- Grid reference: SE04572214
- Platforms: 2

Other information
- Status: Disused

History
- Pre-grouping: Lancashire and Yorkshire Railway
- Post-grouping: London, Midland and Scottish Railway

Key dates
- 1 June 1885: Opened
- 8 July 1929: Closed
Location

Triangle railway station was a railway station near Triangle on the Rishworth branch built by the Lancashire & Yorkshire Railway.

When open, services ran to Sowerby Bridge heading north, and to Rishworth heading south. Only the station house remains.

Preceding station	Disused railways	Following station
Ripponden and Barkisland	L&YR; Rishworth branch	Watson's Crossing
