= Watson's Crossing Halt railway station =

Disused railway station in West Yorkshire, England

Watson's Crossing Halt

General information
- Location: Sowerby Bridge, Calderdale; England
- Coordinates: 53.7027°N 1.9163°W
- Grid reference: SE058230

Other information
- Status: Disused

History
- Pre-grouping: Lancashire and Yorkshire Railway
- Post-grouping: London, Midland and Scottish Railway

Key dates
- 1907: opened
- 8 July 1929: closed
Location

Watson's Crossing Halt was a halt on the Rishworth branch, in West Yorkshire, England built by the Lancashire & Yorkshire Railway. It was located just west of Watson Mill Lane, named after a nearby woollen mill.

== History ==
The halt was opened to serve the new motor railcar service in 1907 which was introduced on this line and the neighbouring Stainland Branch in response to growing competition from trams. When open, services ran to Sowerby Bridge heading north, and to Rishworth heading south.

== Route ==
Preceding station	Disused railways	Following station
Triangle	L&YR; Rishworth branch	Sowerby Bridge
