= Ripponden and Barkisland railway station =

Disused railway station in West Yorkshire, England

Ripponden and Barkisland

General information
- Location: Ripponden, Calderdale; England
- Coordinates: 53.674024°N 1.937673°W
- Grid reference: SE042197
- Platforms: 2

Other information
- Status: Disused

History
- Original company: Lancashire and Yorkshire Railway
- Pre-grouping: Lancashire and Yorkshire Railway
- Post-grouping: London, Midland and Scottish Railway

Key dates
- 5 August 1878: Opened as Ripponden
- 1 December 1891: Name changed to Ripponden and Barkisland
- 8 July 1929: Closed to passengers
- 1958: closed completely
Location

Ripponden and Barkisland railway station was opened by the Lancashire & Yorkshire Railway on the Rishworth branch in 1878 as Ripponden. Ripponden is in Calderdale, West Yorkshire, England. Its name was changed to Ripponden and Barkisland on 1 December 1891. The Lancashire and Yorkshire railway was absorbed by the London and North Western Railway on 1 January 1922, which became one of the constituents of the London, Midland and Scottish Railway on grouping in 1923. The latter company closed the station to passengers on 8 July 1929 and British Railways ceased goods traffic in 1958 after which the line was dismantled.

The branch connected Sowerby Bridge to the north with the terminus Rishworth to the south.

Preceding station	Disused railways	Following station
Rishworth	L&YR; Rishworth branch	Triangle
