= Rushworth =

Rushworth is a surname of English origin and may refer to:

As a surname:

- Barry Rushworth, Australian rugby player
- Chris Rushworth (born 1986), English cricketer
- Carl Rushworth (born 2001), English football player
- Edward Rushworth (politician) (1755–1817), British politician
- Edward Rushworth (colonial administrator) (1818–1877), British colonial administrator
- Harold Rushworth (1880–1950), New Zealand politician
- John Rushworth (1612–1690), English historian
- John Rushworth (surgeon) (1669–1736), English surgeon
- Katie_Rushworth (born 1983), English garden designer and TV presenter
- Lee Rushworth (born 1982), English cricketer
- Matthew Rushworth, British experimental psychologist
- Michele Rushworth, American artist
- Robert A. Rushworth (1924–1993), American test pilot
- Sam_Rushworth (born 1984), British politician
- Val Rushworth (contemporary), British cyclist
- Verity Rushworth (born 1985), English actress
- William Rushworth (organ builder) (1807–?), English organ builder
- William Rushworth (trade unionist) (1879–1929), English trade union leader
- William Rushworth (cricketer) (1914–1966), English cricketer

As a given name:

- Rushworth Kidder (1944–2012), American philosopher

Fictional characters:

- Mr. Rushworth, a character from Jane Austen's novel Mansfield Park

== See also ==
- Rushworth, Victoria, in Australia
  - Rushworth Football Club, Australian rules football club based in Rushworth
  - Rushworth Chronicle and Goulburn Advertiser, Australian newspaper that was published between 1886 and 1977
- Rushworth College, in Rushford, Norfolk
- Rushworth and Dreaper, English organ-makers
- Rishworth (disambiguation)
