= Triangle, West Yorkshire =

Village in West Yorkshire, England

Coordinates: 53.694°N 1.930°W

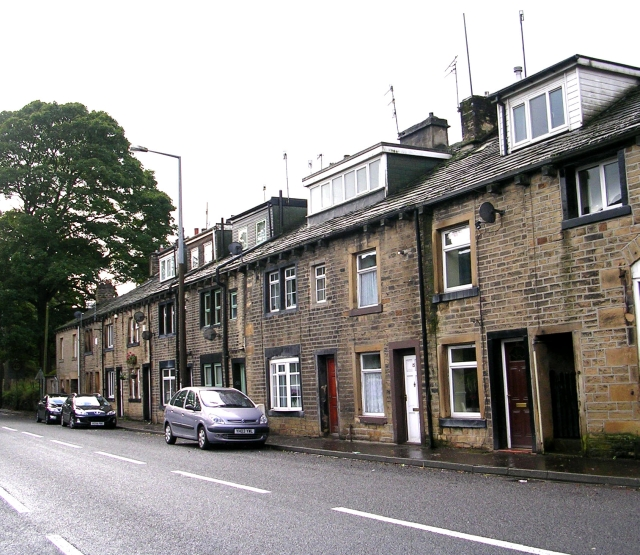
Rochdale Road, Triangle

Triangle is a village in the Calderdale borough of West Yorkshire, England. It is located in the valley of the River Ryburn, on the A58 road over the South Pennines, between Sowerby Bridge and Ripponden. Historically a part of the West Riding of Yorkshire, it dates mainly from the 19th century period of industrialisation but was here for some time prior. The name of the village derives from the patch of ground formed when the old road parted with the newer (A58) toll road to Rochdale. Previous to this time the village was named Pond.

The village has a primary school.

== Thorpe House ==
Thorpe House is near Triangle. It was built in 1804 and was home to Arnold Williams, Liberal MP for Sowerby in the 1920s. During the Second World War it served as officers' quarters for the Royal Engineers, after which it lay empty for 12 years. In 1957 Thorpe House was repaired and converted into a home for elderly people, which it remained until 1994.

== See also ==
- Triangle railway station
