= JLA =

JLA may refer to:

- Japan Lacrosse Association
- JLA, a comic book series 1997–2006
- The Justice League of America, a DC Comics superhero team
- JLA (company), a laundry equipment provider
- Yugoslav People's Army
