= Rishworth =

Village in West Yorkshire, England

Coordinates: 53.665°N 1.949°W

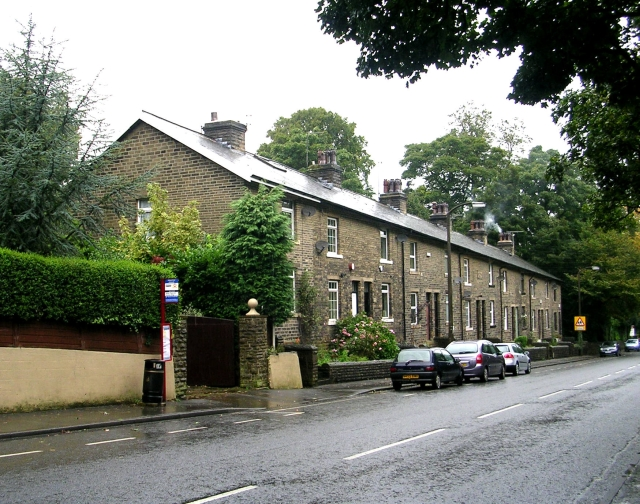
- Oldham Road, Rishworth

- Location within West Yorkshire
- Civil parish: Ripponden
- Metropolitan borough: Calderdale
- Metropolitan county: West Yorkshire
- Region: Yorkshire and the Humber
- Country: England
- Sovereign state: United Kingdom
- Post town: SOWERBY BRIDGE
- Postcode district: HX6
- Dialling code: 01422
- Police: West Yorkshire
- Fire: West Yorkshire
- Ambulance: Yorkshire
- UK Parliament: Calder Valley

Rishworth is a village in the civil parish of Ripponden, in Calderdale, West Yorkshire, England. Historically in the West Riding of Yorkshire, it has a small church, farms and schools, including Rishworth School. In 1931 the parish had a population of 838.

St. Johns Rishworth CofE Primary School provides primary-level education for children in Rishworth. The school is a Church of England school, with classes making occasional trips to the church situated on Godley Lane.

== Former railway ==
Rishworth was the terminus of the Rishworth branch of the Lancashire and Yorkshire Railway from Sowerby Bridge. It opened in 1881 and closed to passengers in 1929.

== Governance ==
Rishworth was a township in the parish of Halifax. From 1866 Rishworth was a civil parish until 1 April 1937 it was abolished to form Ripponden.

== See also ==
- Listed buildings in Ripponden
