= Listed buildings in Ripponden =

Ripponden is a civil parish in the metropolitan borough of Calderdale, West Yorkshire, England. It contains 181 listed buildings that are recorded in the National Heritage List for England. Of these, two are listed at Grade I, the highest of the three grades, eight are at Grade II*, the middle grade, and the others are at Grade II, the lowest grade. The parish contains the village of Ripponden, smaller settlements, including Barkisland and Rishworth, and the surrounding area. Most of the listed buildings are houses and associated structures, cottages, farmhouses, laithe houses, and farm buildings, and almost all of these are built in stone with stone slate roofs and contain mullioned windows. The other listed buildings include churches and chapels, public houses, bridges, milestones, a cross base converted into a mounting block, schools, a set of stocks, a pinfold, former mills and associated structures, a former shooting lodge, two wheelhouses for a reservoir, and two war memorials.

== Key ==
Grade	Criteria
I	Buildings of exceptional interest, sometimes considered to be internationally important
II*	Particularly important buildings of more than special interest
II	Buildings of national importance and special interest

== Buildings ==
Name and location	Photograph	Date	Notes	Grade
Curved steps, Stainland Road; 53.67629°N 1.91838°W		Medieval (probable)	Half of a cross base, later used as a mounting block. It consists of four semicircular steps in gritstone.	II
Barn to north-northeast of the Griffin Public House; 53.67636°N 1.91236°W	—	16th century	The barn has a timber framed core, and was encased in stone in the 18th century. It has quoins, and three bays.	II
Lower Moor Farmhouse and barn 53.67697°N 1.95265°W	—	Mid 16th century	The oldest part is the timber framed core of the barn, which was enclosed in stone when the farmhouse was built in the 17th century. The building is in stone, partly rendered, with a stone slate roof, and the barn is at right angles, forming an L-shaped plan. The house has a string course, quoins at the rear, two storeys, three bays, a single-storey aisle at the rear, and mullioned windows. Part of the barn has been incorporated into the house. The house has a gabled porch with 1½ storeys, a sundial finial, and a Tudor arched doorway with a moulded surround and spandrels. The barn has a double aisle, a doorway with composite jambs, a large lintel, and cart entries in the aisle portal.	II*
3 and 6 Heights and gateway 53.66982°N 1.94078°W	—	Late 16th century	A house, later divided into two, it is in stone with a stone slate roof. There are two storeys, and it consists of a three-bay hall range, and a projecting cross-wing on the left with a plinth, a string course, and coped gables. The windows are chamfered and mullioned, some with decorative hood moulds. The original doorway has a chamfered surround and a shaped lintel, and there is an inserted doorway with monolithic jambs. The rear has a U-shaped plan with three gables that are coped and have kneelers. Attached to the rear of the east wing is a gateway with a moulded surround, a depressed Tudor arched lintel, Gothic coping, and the bases for three ball finials.	II
Clough House Farmhouse and Cottages; 53.68086°N 1.96369°W	—	Late 16th century	A row of five cottages was added to the farmhouse in the 19th century. The building is in stone with quoins and a stone slate roof. There are two storeys and an attic, and a U-shaped plan, with two projecting wings. Most of the windows are mullioned, and there are some sash windows. The doorways vary; one has a Tudor arched lintel and a chamfered surround, some have arched heads, and the jambs are composite or monolithic.	II
Great Greave; 53.68235°N 1.97454°W		Late 16th century	An addition was made to the house in the 19th century, which is in stone with quoins, and a stone slate roof. There are two storeys, and the house consists of a three bay hall range, cross-wings projecting to the south with coped gables and kneelers, and a rear aisle. The windows are double-chamfered with mullions, some have transoms, and some have hood moulds. The main doorway has a moulded surround, and a Tudor arched lintel with carved spandrels, and elsewhere are doorways with wooden surrounds, or monolithic jambs.	II*
Upper Goat House; 53.66141°N 1.95337°W		Late 16th century	A porch was added to the house in 1624, and there have been later alterations and extensions. The house is in stone with stone slate roofs, and it has two storeys and front of five bays. The first bay contains a doorway with monolithic jambs, and the next bay has two coped gables with kneelers and an inserted doorway. The third bay is a gabled cross-wing with finials, and the next bay contains a two-storey porch with an entrance with a moulded surround, and a Tudor arched lintel with shields in the spandrels. The inner doorway has a chamfered surround, and the upper storey is slightly jettied on moulded corbels. The fifth bay is a refronting of the former service wing, and the windows are mullioned.	II
Lower Goat House; 53.65904°N 1.94737°W	—	1585 (possible)	The house was largely rebuilt in the 18th and 20th centuries. It is in stone with quoins, and a stone slate roof with a coped gable, kneelers, and a finial. There are two storeys, and an L-shaped plan, consisting of a three-bay hall range, and a gabled cross-wing on the left. The windows are mullioned with hood moulds. The doorway has a chamfered surround and composite jambs, and above it is a hood mould with a recess containing a sundial. The rear has been remodelled and includes a modern extension.	II
Upper Cockcroft Farmhouse; 53.65940°N 1.96493°W		1607	The farmhouse was joined to Upper Cockcroft in 1642, and a porch was added in 1701. The farmhouse is in stone on a plinth, rendered at the rear, and has a stone slate roof with coped gables. The porch has an arched doorway with a moulded surround, and a dated and initialled lintel, and the original entrance also has a dated and initialled lintel. The windows are chamfered with mullions, and the main window also has transoms and twelve lights. The range connecting to the house has a ten-light window.	II*
Bank Hall Farmhouse; 53.67803°N 1.93016°W		1612	The farmhouse, which was altered and extended in the 18th century, is in stone, on a plinth at the rear, with quoins and a stone slate roof. There are two storeys, a double-depth plan, three bays at the front and four at the rear. The windows are mullioned, and there are two doorways with monolithic jambs.	II
Bowers; 53.68267°N 1.89947°W	—	1614	The house was extended later in the century with the addition of a parallel range, and there were further alterations in the 19th century. It is in stone, with a plinth on the south front, a string course, a stone slate roof, and two storeys. On the front is a porch with an arched doorway that has a moulded surround, shields in the spandrels, and a triangular pediment, a coped gable, and a lantern finial. In the range to the north are the older parts of the house; some of the windows are sashes and there is also a mullioned and transomed window with a hood mould. The original doorway has a Tudor arched doorway with a chamfered surround and a lintel carved with the date.	II
30/32 and 36 Stainford Road; 53.67600°N 1.91498°W	—	1618	The house, which was altered and extended in the 18th century, is in stone with a stone slate roof, and has two storeys. There is an L-shaped plan, consisting of a three-bay main range, and a projecting western cross-wing with a plinth, quoins, and two gables. The windows are mullioned, and there is a doorway with monolithic jambs. The rear faces the road, and contains a porch with a moulded surround, and an arched and inscribed lintel with shields in the spandrels.	II
Wall and gateway, Bowers; 53.68279°N 1.89942°W	—	1618	The wall is in stone with Gothic coping. In the wall is a gateway with moulded jambs, a Tudor arch with sunken spandrels containing shields, a dated and initialled lintel, a pediment with an open tympanum, and finials.	II
Great House Farmhouse; 53.66954°N 1.96436°W	—	1622	The rear and sides of the farmhouse were rebuilt in about 1800. The house is in stone with quoins, and a stone slate roof with coped gables and kneelers. There are two storeys and a front of two bays. The central doorway has an ogee lintel and a cornice, above which is a datestone. All the windows are double-chamfered with mullions and arched lights with sunken spandrels, and those in the ground floor on the front also have transoms.	II
Great House; 53.66968°N 1.96481°W	—	1624	The house is in stone, on a plinth, with two storeys. The main range has a stone slate roof, and three parallel gabled ridges, and the other range is lower and has a tile roof. The lower range has a porch with a coped gable, a moulded surround, a Tudor arched dated lintel, carved spandrels, and a triangular pediment, and the windows are mullioned. The main range has coped gables, a parapet, and lantern finials. The windows on the front are mullioned and transomed, with decorative hood moulds, and a stepped string course. In each gable is a columbarium.	II*
Lower Clay Pits; 53.68861°N 1.96066°W	—	1625	The house is in stone, rendered at the sides and rear, with quoins, and a stone slate roof with a coped gable and kneelers. There are two storeys, three bays, a single-storey rear aisle, and an outshut. The windows are mullioned, and one also has transoms. The main doorway has a chamfered surround, composite jambs, and an inscribed Tudor arched lintel with spandrels, and elsewhere are two doorways with monolithic jambs.	II
Outbuilding southwest of Calf Hey Farmhouse; 53.66678°N 1.90621°W	—	Early 17th century	An outbuilding of uncertain purpose, it is in stone, partly rendered, with quoins and a stone slate roof. It contains double chamfered mullioned windows, and a doorway with composite jambs and a depressed Tudor arched lintel.	II
Fern Lee, Chapel Farmhouse and Croft Cottage, Old Bank; 53.67405°N 1.93893°W	—	Early 17th century	A house, later divided, it is in stone with quoins, and a stone slate roof with a coped gable and kneelers in the wing. There are two storeys, a three-bay main range, and a gabled cross-wing. Most of the windows are mullioned, there is one sash window, and most have hood moulds. The original doorway has a Tudor arched lintel, and there is an inserted doorway with composite jambs.	II
Weather Hill; 53.69141°N 1.96177°W	—	Early 17th century	The house, which was extended in the 19th century, is in stone with quoins and a stone slate roof. There are two storeys and three bays. The windows are mullioned, and the doorways have monolithic jambs.	II
Wren Nest; 53.67426°N 1.96405°W	—	Early 17th century	The two-bay house was extended by one bay in the 19th century. It is in stone, partly rendered, with quoins and a stone slate roof. There are two storeys, and a single-storey aisle to the rear. The doorway has a chamfered surround and composite jambs. The windows in the original part are chamfered and mullioned, and in the added bay they are sashes.	II
Old House Farmhouse and barn 53.67562°N 1.92963°W	—	1620s	The house and the barn at the rear are in stone, the house is rendered, and they have a stone slate roof. The house has two storeys and an irregular plan, with an aisle to the west, and a coped gable with kneelers. The windows are chamfered and mullioned, and in the upper floor of the aisle is a three-light window with arched lights and spandrels. The doorway has a decorated dated lintel. The barn has a single aisle, a former cart entry in the portal, windows, and a chamfered vent.	II
Paddock Nook; 53.66944°N 1.94222°W	—	1626	The house was extended by a bay in the 18th century. It is in stone and whitewashed, and has a stone slate roof. There are two storeys and three bays. The windows are chamfered and mullioned, and there is a continuous hood mould above the ground floor windows. In the left return is a doorway with a lintel containing the date in a tressure.	II
Swift Place, Swift Mews, Swift Cottage and gate piers 53.66643°N 1.96145°W	—	1626	A rear courtyard block was added to the house in 1698, and the addition of a wing in 1704 enclosed the courtyard. The building is in stone, and has stone slate roofs with coped gables, kneelers, and ball finials. The house has two storeys, and the west wing also has a plinth and a basement. Two of the doorways have dated lintels, the windows are mullioned, some also have transoms, and some have hood moulds. In the courtyard is a pair of gate piers each of which has rusticated pilasters, a pulvinated frieze, a moulded cornice, and a ball finial.	II*
Flat Head; 53.67506°N 1.95077°W	—	1627	A cross-wing was added to the house in 1706. The house is in stone, with quoins in the wing, and a stone slate roof. There are two storeys, a hall range of three bays, a projecting cross-wing on the left with a coped gable and kneelers, and a rear wing at right angles. The windows are mullioned, some with hood moulds. On the front is a porch that has a Tudor arched doorway with a moulded surround and shields in the spandrels. The inner doorway has a Tudor arch, and a lintel inscribed with initials and the date in a tressure. At the rear is a similar doorway with an inscribed lintel, and a two-storey porch, the upper floor carried on an octagonal column.	II
Beeston Hall; 53.66780°N 1.97588°W	—	1628	The house, later divided into three, is in stone on a plinth, with a moulded string course, a parapet, and a stone slate roof with coped gables, one with a lantern finial. There are two storeys, three parallel gabled ranges, and a recessed gabled wing on the right. The windows on the front are sashes, and at the rear are mullioned windows and a tall stair window; some of the windows have hood moulds. In the right return is a doorway with monolithic jambs, and the wing contains a doorway with chamfered surrounds and a datestone.	II
Lower Hall; 53.67554°N 1.91030°W	—	1629	The house was partly rebuilt at the front in the 19th century. It is in stone with quoins and a stone slate roof. There are two storeys, three bays, and a parallel range under two gables at the rear. There are two porches; one has a moulded surround, a lintel with a moulded surround containing the date, and spandrels carved with roses. The inner doorway has a chamfered surround and a Tudor arched lintel. The other porch has a segmental arch, a moulded surround, shields carved in the spandrels, and a triangular pediment. The windows are mullioned, some containing sashes.	II
Former White Hart Inn and barn 53.66900°N 1.95190°W	—	1630	A three-bay building was added to the original house in the 19th century, it was refronted in the 19th century when a barn was also added, and was at one time a public house. It is in stone with quoins, a band, and a stone slate roof, and at the rear is a single-storey outshut. Some of the windows are sashes, some are mullioned, and at the rear is a stair window with an architrave. One doorway has a chamfered surround, composite jambs and an inscribed lintel, and the other doorway has monolithic jambs. In the barn is a segmental-arched cart entry, doorways with monolithic jambs and rectangular vents.	II
Low Cote; 53.67500°N 1.96005°W	—	1631	A stone house with quoins, a moulded string course, and a stone slate roof with coped gables, kneelers, and a finial. There are two storeys, three bays, a single-storey aisle at the rear and a single-storey outbuilding on the right. The windows are mullioned, and without hood moulds. The porch is finely carved, the doorway has a moulded surround, a Tudor arched lintel, and spandrels inscribed with initials and the date. The inner doorway has a Tudor arch and sunken spandrels, and elsewhere are two doorways with monolithic jambs, and one with tie-stone jambs.	II
68 Stainford Road; 53.67560°N 1.91201°W	—	Early to mid 17th century	A stone house with quoins and a stone slate roof. There are two storeys, three bays, and a single-storey wing at the front. The windows are mullioned, and there is an inserted doorway on the front with monolithic jambs. The rear faces the road, and it contains another doorway with monolithic jambs.	II
Far Barsey Farmhouse; 53.68007°N 1.90309°W	—	Early to mid 17th century	A stone farmhouse on a plinth with a string course and a stone slate roof. There are two storeys, a front of three bays, and a single-storey aisle at the rear. On the front is an open porch and an arched doorway with a chamfered surround, and at the rear are two doorway with monolithic jambs. Most of the windows are mullioned, and some have been altered.	II
Lower Hey House and cottages 53.65078°N 1.92336°W	—	Early to mid 17th century	The three cottages were added to the house in the 18th century. The buildings are in stone with stone slate roofs, two storeys. and mullioned windows. The house has a string course and two bays. Each cottage has one bay, and a doorway with monolithic jambs, and one cottage has a porch.	II
Barkisland Hall; 53.67587°N 1.90961°W		1638	A large house in stone on a plinth, with a string course, a parapet, and a stone slate roof with coped gables and bases for finials. There are three storeys, and a double-pile F-shaped plan, and a front of three gabled bays. The porch has three storeys, fluted Doric columns on pedestals decorated with lozenges, and an entablature, and the doorway has moulded jambs, moulded imposts, and a moulded Tudor arched lintel carved with initials, the date and a face. In the middle floor are fluted Ionic columns and a six-light window, in the top floor is a rose window containing seven circular lights, and above it is a pedimented gable. The windows are mullioned and transomed.	I
The Griffin Inn; 53.67581°N 1.91267°W		1642	Originally a private house, it was extended to the south in the 18th century, and has been converted into a public house. It is in stone, partly rendered at the rear, with stone slate roofs, and two storeys. The earliest part consists of two parallel ranges at the rear. The doorway has monolithic jambs, and the windows are mullioned.	II
The Howroyde; 53.67168°N 1.91317°W		1642	A house with a timber framed core, external walls in stone, and with a stone slate roof. There are two storeys and a double-pile plan, and the house consists of a hall range with slightly projecting gabled cross-wings and a rear kitchen wing. The cross-wings were refronted in the 18th century, and have quoins. The major window in the hall range is mullioned and transomed with 18 lights and a decorative hood mould, and the windows in the cross-wings are sashes. In the left angle on the front is a doorway with fluted Ionic columns, moulded jambs, a moulded impost, an inscribed Tudor arched lintel, and an entablature. There is a similar doorway at the rear with Doric columns.	I
Upper Cockcroft; 53.65931°N 1.96518°W		1642	The house is in stone with a moulded string course, and a stone slate roof with coped gables and finials. There are two storeys and a double-pile plan. On the front are two gables and a two-storey gabled porch with an arched entrance, a moulded surround, and a columbarium in the apex, and the inner doorway has a chamfered surround. The windows are double-chamfered with mullions, in the ground floor they also have transoms, and in the upper floor they have decorative hood moulds.	II*
1 and 2 Rishworth Hall and barn 53.66156°N 1.95516°W	—	Mid 17th century	The house is attached to a cottage and a barn, the latter both dating from the 19th century. The buildings are in stone with quoins and stone slate roofs. The windows are mullioned, and the doorways have monolithic jambs. The original house has a string course, two bays, and a wing under a catslide roof, the cottage has one bay, and the barn contains a segmental-arched cart entry at the front with a keystone, and arched vents, and there is another cart entry at the rear.	II
23–29 Soyland Town Road; 53.68103°N 1.94395°W		17th century	The house was largely rebuilt in the 19th and 20th centuries, and has been divided. It is in stone with a stone slate roof and two storeys. There is a U-shaped plan, consisting of a central range, and projecting gabled wings. In the central range are paired doorways to the left, and another doorway to the right with a chamfered surround. The windows are mullioned, and attached to the west wing is a single bay.	II
76 Stainford Road; 53.67542°N 1.91128°W	—	Mid 17th century (probable)	The house is in rendered stone, and has a stone slate roof, two storeys, and two bays. The windows are mullioned, and entry is by a lean-to porch on the left return.	II
Barn northeast of Great Greave; 53.68250°N 1.97436°W	—	Mid 17th century	A stone barn with quoins and a stone slate roof. It has an L-shaped plan with 1½ aisles. In the portal of the aisle is a wide cart entry, with a lintel forming a porch. In the angle is a doorway with tie-stone jambs, there is a similar doorway at the rear, and to the right of the cart entry is a doorway with monolithic jambs. In the right gable end are rectangular vents.	II
Heycroft Farm; 53.64577°N 1.90863°W	—	17th century	Two houses in one range, with two gabled wings added to the northwest in the 18th century. They are in stone with quoins, and stone slate roofs that have gables with chamfered coping. There are two storeys, the windows are mullioned, and there is a single-storey lean-to extension.	II
Kettlesnout; 53.67109°N 1.95258°W	—	Mid 17th century	The house, which was altered in the 19th and 20th centuries, is in stone, rendered at the sides and rear, with quoins, and a stone slate roof with a coped gable, kneelers, and a finial. There are two storeys, a single-story rear aisle, a two-storey kitchen wing at right angles, and a front of three bays. On the front is a gabled porch that has a Tudor arched doorway with a moulded surround, and spandrels, and the inner doorway has a chamfered surround and a Tudor arched lintel. Some windows are mullioned, and most have been altered.	II
Barn southwest of Kettlesnout; 53.67092°N 1.95280°W	—	Mid 17th century	A stone barn with quoins, a stone slate roof, and a single aisle. The doorways within the portal of the aisle have chamfered surrounds.	II
Kirk Cliff; 53.67830°N 1.94326°W	—	Mid 17th century	A stone house with quoins, and a stone slate roof. There are two storeys, a three-bay hall range, and a gabled cross-wing. Most of the windows have been altered, and in the cross-wing they have hood moulds. The hall range is rendered, and contains a doorway with a chamfered surround and an arched lintel.	II
Lightcliffe Royd; 53.68338°N 1.90807°W	—	Mid 17th century	A stone house on a plinth, with a string course and a stone slate roof. There are two storeys, three bays, and a single-storey aisle at the rear. On the front is a porch with a coped gable and decorated kneelers, and a Tudor arched doorway with a moulded surround and shields in the spandrels. Most of the windows are mullioned, and at the rear is a doorway with a chamfered surround and a Tudor arched lintel.	II
Barn east of Lightcliffe Royd; 53.68346°N 1.90755°W	—	Mid 17th century	The barn is in stone with quoins, and a stone slate roof that has a coped south gable with kneelers and vents. The barn has a single aisle and four bays, and contains a square-headed cart entry, and three doorways with chamfered surrounds, two of them also with quoined lintels.	II
Lower Bottomley Farmhouse and barn 53.66650°N 1.90601°W	—	Mid 17th century	The barn was added to the farmhouse in the 19th century. The building is in stone, partly rendered, with quoins and a stone slate roof. The house has two storeys, two bays, and a single-storey aisle at the rear, and contains mullioned windows. In the barn is a segmental-arched cart entry.	II
Lower Coneygarth Farmhouse; 53.66969°N 1.93059°W	—	Mid 17th century	Most of the farmhouse dates from the 18th and 19th centuries. It is in stone with quoins, a stone slate roof, and two storeys. The windows are mullioned, and there is a 20th-century dormer at the rear. The doorways have monolithic jambs.	II
Lower Kebroyd, barn, walls and gateway 53.68604°N 1.93683°W	—	17th century	The house was converted in the 19th century to be the lodge for Kebroyd Hall. It is in stone with quoins, and has a slate roof with coped gables, kneelers, and ball finials. There are two storeys, a double-pile plan, two gables at the front, and a rear wing. The windows are mullioned. Attached to the left of the house at right angles is a barn containing a segmental-arched cart entry. And attached to the barn are courtyard walls with corner turrets; the walls contain gateways with semicircular arches, keystones, hood moulds, and open triangular pediments with ball finials.	II
Lower Wormald; 53.66170°N 1.97557°W	—	17th century	A stone house with quoins and a stone slate roof. There are two storeys, a two-bay hall range, and a projecting gabled cross-wing on the left. The windows are mullioned, and there are two doorways with monolithic jambs, one in the hall range and one in the wing.	II
Nook End; 53.65444°N 1.98018°W	—	Mid 17th century	A stone house, now derelict, that had quoins and a stone slate roof. There were two storeys and two bays. The windows were chamfered and mullioned with a continuous hood mould above the ground floor windows.	II
Wormald Farmhouse; 53.66732°N 1.91033°W		Mid 17th century	The porch and rear wing were added to the house in 1693. The house is in stone with a string course and a stone slate roof. There are two storeys, a double-depth plan, a south front of two gabled bays, and a rear wing. In the south front are double-chamfered mullioned and transomed windows, with stepped windows of three over five lights in the upper floor. The porch is gabled and the doorway is arched and has a lintel with initials and the date in a tressure.	II*
Barn north of Lower Clay Pits; 53.68879°N 1.96057°W	—	1657	A stone barn with quoins that has a stone slate roof with finials on the gables. It contains a cart entry with composite jambs, and two doorways, each with chamfered composite jambs and Tudor arched lintels, one inscribed with the date in a tressure. In the right return are rectangular vents.	II
Clay House; 53.68446°N 1.96208°W		1662	The house, which was rebuilt and remodelled in 1915, is in stone with quoins, and a stone slate roof with coped gables and kneelers. There are two storeys and three bays. On the front is a gabled porch that has a doorway with a Tudor arched lintel, and a cross window. The other windows are mullioned. At the rear is a doorway with a chamfered surround, an inscribed Tudor arched lintel, carved spandrels, and a hood mould.	II
New Laithe Barn; 53.65380°N 1.96807°W	—	1665	A stone barn with a stone slate roof, a double aisle, and three bays. There is a cart entry in the portal of the aisle, a doorway with a chamfered surround, monolithic jambs, and a quoined lintel with the date in a tressure, and a mullioned window.	II
Nelson House; 53.67574°N 1.91158°W	—	Mid to late 17th century (probable)	A stone house with quoins and a stone slate roof. There are two storeys and a U-shaped plan, consisting of a three-bay hall range and projecting cross-wings, and at the rear are two parallel wings and three gables. Attached to the east wing is a two-storey porch with a catslide roof, an entrance with chamfered surrounds forming spandrels, composite jambs, and a Tudor arched lintel. There is a similar inner doorway, and the windows are mullioned and double chamfered.	II
Water Green and barn 53.68259°N 1.96815°W	—	1671	A row of cottages in stone with quoins, a stone slate roof, and two storeys. The building originated as a three bay house, a bay was added to one end in the 18th century, and in the 19th century another bay and a barn were added at the other end. The original doorway has composite jambs, and a Tudor arched lintel with a moulded surround and inscribed with initials and the date. The later doorways have monolithic jambs, and the windows are mullioned, some with hood moulds.	II
Lower Shaw Farmhouse and barn 53.66968°N 1.97335°W	—	1670s	The barn was added to the farmhouse in the 19th century. The building is in stone with quoins, a moulded string course, and a stone slate roof. The house has two storeys, and consists of a one-bay range and a gabled cross-wing to the right. On the hall range is a two-storey porch with a catslide roof. The doorway has a moulded surround, composite jambs, and a depressed Tudor arched lintel with an inscription in a tressure. The inner doorway has a chamfered surround and a Tudor arched lintel. The windows are mullioned, and in the right return is an arched window with spandrels. The barn to the left has a segmental-arched cart entry, an arched window above, and a doorway with tie-stone jambs.	II
3 Rishworth Hall; 53.66174°N 1.95480°W	—	Late 17th century	A stone cottage with quoins and a stone slate roof. There are two storeys, one bay, and a single-storey outshut at the rear. The cottage has two doorways with monolithic jambs, and the windows are mullioned.	II
Barn southwest of Bank Royd Farmhouse; 53.66223°N 1.91408°W	—	Late 17th century	The barn is in stone with quoins, and a stone slate roof with a coped gable on the left. It has an L-shaped plan with a single aisle, and contains a recessed cart entry with a window above, and a doorway.	II
Gate piers, Barkisland Hall; 53.67537°N 1.91026°W	—	Late 17th century (probable)	The gate piers are at the entrance of the drive to the hall. They are in stone, and each pier has an impost, a pulvinated frieze, a moulded cornice, and a ball finial on a tall tapering baluster.	II
Barsey Farmhouse; 53.68087°N 1.90199°W	—	Late 17th century	The farmhouse was altered in the 19th century when the roof was raised. It is in stone with a stone slate roof, two storeys, and three bays. The doorway has tie-stone jambs, and the windows are mullioned.	II
Brown Hill; 53.68216°N 1.94885°W	—	Late 17th century	A stone house with a stone slate roof, two storeys, three bays, and a single-bay outshut at the rear. The doorway at the front and the rear each has shouldered jambs and a segmental-arched lintel, and the windows are mullioned.	II
Lane Head; 53.68089°N 1.95088°W	—	Late 17th century	The house is in stone on a plinth, with quoins, a string course, and a stone slate roof with coped gables and kneelers. There are two storeys, a double-pile plan, and three bays. The windows are double-chamfered and mullioned. On the front is an inserted doorway with a dated lintel, and at the rear is a doorway with composite jambs.	II
Cottage attached to Lightcliffe Royd Farmhouse; 53.68349°N 1.90770°W	—	Late 17th century (probable)	The cottage, which was altered in the 19th century, is in stone with a stone slate roof. There are two storeys and two bays. The windows are mullioned, and there are three doorways with monolithic jambs, two on the front, and one at the rear.	II
Lower Woodhead Farmhouse; 53.65627°N 1.91680°W	—	Late 17th century	The farmhouse was altered and extended in 1736. It is in stone with quoins, and a stone slate roof with coped gables and moulded kneelers. There are two storeys, the original house had two bays, and the extension added three bays, and an outshut to the rear. The windows are mullioned, and on the front is a gabled porch. The doorway has a chamfered surround and a straight lintel, and in each of the added bays is an inserted doorway with monolithic jambs.	II
Near Royd Farmhouse and barn 53.65306°N 1.93728°W	—	Late 17th century	The house and attached barn are in stone with quoins and a stone slate roof. The house has a front of two storeys, two bays, and a single-storey aisle at the rear. The windows are mullioned, and there is a modern porch. The barn has a cart entry on the front with a straight lintel on corbelled jambs. There is another cart entry at the rear, and a doorway with a quoined lintel inscribed with initials and a date. There are rectangular vents at the front and the rear.	II
New House Farmhouse; 53.65358°N 1.92338°W	—	Late 17th century	The farmhouse is in stone, on a plinth, with quoins, a string course, and a stone slate roof with coped gables and moulded kneelers. There are two storeys, three bays, and a rear kitchen wing. The doorway has a moulded surround and an altered lintel, and the windows are chamfered and mullioned.	II
The Brown Cow; 53.66089°N 1.95279°W	—	Late 17th century	The house, at one time a public house, is in stone with quoins and a stone slate roof. There are two storeys, and a T-shaped plan, with the south front being the long side of a cross-wing, and the main range at the rear. On the front is a porch, the windows are mullioned, and there is a circular window in the apex of the right return.	II
The Homestead, Homestead Cottage and mill 53.68675°N 1.94894°W		Late 17th century	The oldest part is the house, at one time a public house, with the cottage and mill added to the north in the 18th and 19th centuries. They are in stone with quoins and stone slate roofs, and they form a U-shaped block. The house has two storeys and an attic, two bays, mullioned windows, and two doorways, one with a chamfered surround and composite jambs, and the other with a moulded surround and a quoined lintel. The cottage is to the right and recessed, it has two storeys, a single-storey outshut at the rear, one bay, mullioned windows, and a doorway with tie-stone jambs. Further to the right is the former mill that has two storeys and a loft, square windows, and two doorways, one with tie-stone jambs, and the other with a chamfered lintel.	II
Thirst House; 53.68297°N 1.96413°W	—	Late 17th century	A stone house with quoins and a stone slate roof. There are two storeys, two bays, and a single-storey aisle at the rear. The original doorway has a chamfered surround and a straight lintel, and there is a later inserted doorway. The windows are chamfered with mullions.	II
Barn south of Flat Head; 53.67494°N 1.95067°W	—	1676	A stone barn with quoins and a stone slate roof. Facing the south is a wide gable with an aisle to the east, containing a segmental-arched cart entry and arched vents. In the right return is a doorway with a chamfered surround and a Tudor arched lintel with initials and the date in a tressure.	II
Lower Cockcroft, Bowlers Cottage and barn 53.65990°N 1.96721°W	—	1679	A rear wing, and a barn to the left, were added in 1709. The building is in stone and has a stone slate roof with coped gables and one ball finial. There are two storeys, a long range, and mullioned windows. The porch is gabled, and has a doorway with tie-stone jambs, and above the lintel is a columbarium. At the rear is a double gabled range at right angles. The barn has a cart entry and an aisle. At the left is an entrance flanked by tall gate piers, each of which has a pulvinated frieze, a cornice and a ball finial.	II
Baitings Hall and Baitings Lodge Farmhouse; 53.66752°N 1.99559°W	—	1682	A rear wing was added to the house in the 19th century. The building is in stone with a stone slate roof and two storeys. Its plan consists of a hall range, projecting wings to the front, and a rear wing; the wings have coped gables, kneelers and fleur-de-lys finials. The windows are chamfered with mullions, and some also have transoms. Above the ground floor windows is a continuous hood mould. There is a single-storey gabled porch, in the east wing is a doorway with monolithic jambs and a moulded lintel, and at the rear is a doorway with a moulded surround.	II
Gateway and wall, Clay House; 53.68464°N 1.96215°W		1690	The gateway consists of a segmental archway with composite jambs, a chamfered surround, and a parapet with bases for finials. At right angles is the surviving wall of a house to which an agricultural building has been added. It is in stone, and contains a cart entry with a chamfered surround and a monolithic lintel, a ten-light double-chamfered mullioned window and a smaller window, both with decorated hood moulds.	II
Calf Hey Farmhouse and barn 53.66695°N 1.90582°W	—	1700	The barn was added to the farmhouse in the 19th century. The building is in stone, the house is rendered, and the roof is in stone slate. The house has two storeys, two bays, mullioned windows, and a doorway with a chamfered surround and a dated lintel. The barn has quoins and one bay, and contains a segmental-arched cart entry and a doorway.	II
Bank Royd Farmhouse and barn 53.66240°N 1.91386°W	—	Late 17th or early 18th century (probable)	The barn was added to the farmhouse in the 18th century, and it was partly rebuilt in the 19th century. The building is in stone with quoins, and a stone slate roof with a partly coped gable. There are two storeys, the house has two bays, and there is a single-storey outshut at the rear. The windows are mullioned. The barn on the left has a segmental-arched cart entry flanked by doorways with monolithic jambs.	II
Great Merry Bent; 53.67868°N 1.96835°W	—	Late 17th or early 18th century	A stone house with a moulded band, and a stone slate roof with coped gables and kneelers. There are two storeys, a double-pile plan, a front of two bays, and a projecting wing to the left with a quoined angle. The windows are chamfered and mullioned. The central doorway on the front has a segmental arch and composite jambs, and at the rear is a doorway with a rusticated surround, voussoirs, and a keystone.	II
Cottage and barn east of Wood End; 53.68488°N 1.95407°W	—	Late 17th or early 18th century (probable)	The building is in stone with quoins, a stone slate roof that has a gable with kneelers, and an L-shaped plan. The cottage has one storey, an attic and a cellar, and the windows are mullioned. The doorway has a chamfered surround, composite jambs, and a straight lintel. The barn, which is a right angles, has a cart entry with a monolithic lintel, on the front is a doorway with composite jambs, and at the rear is a doorway with a quoined lintel.	II
Lench House and barn 53.65689°N 1.98765°W	—	1702	The barn was added in 1705. The building is in stone, with quoins between the house and the barn, and a stone slate roof. The house has two storeys, mullioned windows, and a doorway with composite jambs and a dated lintel. The barn to the right contains a cart entry with a monolithic lintel on corbelled jambs, arched vents, and an inscribed and dated lintel.	II
Barn at rear of Swift Place Farmhouse; 53.66646°N 1.96100°W	—	1714	The barn is in stone with quoins and a stone slate roof. It contains a segmental-arched cart entry with voussoirs, a chamfered surround, and a keystone inscribed with initials and the date. There is a similar entry within the portal of the aisle that has doorways with chamfered surrounds. Elsewhere on the front there are mullioned windows, and a doorway with a chamfered surround and a Tudor arched lintel. In the right gable end are arched vents and an owl hole in the apex, and at the rear is another cart entry and a doorway with chamfered jambs and a quoined lintel.	II
The Royd; 53.67600°N 1.94451°W	—	1717 (probable)	A house, later subdivided, in stone with quoins, string courses, a parapet, and a stone slate roof. There are two storeys, a double-pile plan, and an attic and eleven bays. The original doorway has a shouldered architrave, and a triangular pediment, there is a similar doorway at the rear, and elsewhere windows have been converted into doorways. The windows have modern glazing, and in the south gable end is a cross window.	II
Barn northwest of Hill House Farmhouse; 53.66835°N 1.91324°W	—	1718	The barn, which was altered in the 19th century, is in dry stone with quoins and a stone slate roof. There are four bays and a single aisle, and the barn contains a segmental-arched cart entry with an inner porch. In the angle is an arched doorway with tie-stone jambs and a lintel with a date in a tressure. At the lower end is a doorway with a chamfered surround and a quoined lintel, and in the right return are arched vents with sunken spandrels.	II
Rose Cottage; 53.68062°N 1.93705°W	—	1719	A stone house with quoins and a stone slate roof. There are two storeys and two bays. In the centre are paired doorways with monolithic jambs, the windows are mullioned, and in the right gable end is a datestone.	II
Building southeast of Swift Place Farmhouse; 53.66631°N 1.96053°W	—	1720	The building, which is of uncertain purpose, it is in stone with quoins, and has a stone slate roof, hipped at one end, and with a chamfered coped gable at the other. There is one storey, an attic and a cellar, and the windows are mullioned. The main doorway has a moulded surround and a dated lintel. and there is another doorway with tie-stone jambs.	II
Rishworth School Chapel; 53.66191°N 1.95294°W		1725	Originally the schoolroom, later used as the chapel for the school, it was extended in 1960 to add a porch and a sanctuary. The chapel is in stone on a plinth, with quoins, and a stone slate roof with coped gables, kneelers and a cross finial. The windows are double-chamfered with mullions and transoms, there is an inscribed tablet on the wall, and the gabled porch has a Tudor arched doorway.	II
Barn to north of No. 6 Lane Head; 53.68100°N 1.95094°W	—	Early 18th century	A stone barn with quoins and a stone slate roof. There are five bays, and the barn contains a semicircular-arched cart entry with moulded imposts and a keystone, doorways at the ends, and rectangular vents.	II
Barn north of No. 75 Stailand Road; 53.67592°N 1.91143°W	—	Early 18th century	The rebuilding of an earlier barn, it is in stone with quoins and a stone slate roof. On the front are two cart entries with chamfered surrounds and square lintels. Between them are two blocked doorways with chamfered surrounds. In the right return is a mullioned window.	II
15 and 17 Lane Head Road; 53.68071°N 1.95059°W	—	1727	A house later divided into two, it is in stone with quoins, and a stone slate roof with coped gables and kneelers. There are two storeys and three bays. In the left bay is a later gabled extension containing a modern doorway. The windows are mullioned.	II
Barn and four cottages to west of Lower Woodhead Farmhouse; 53.65577°N 1.91731°W	—	1736 (probable)	The barn is the oldest part, and the cottages were added in the 18th and 19th centuries. The buildings are in stone with stone slate roofs. The barn has quoins, a segmental-arched cart entry on both fronts, arched vents in the left return, and a single-bay cottage attached to the right. The other four cottages have two storeys, one bay each, mullioned windows, and doorways with monolithic jambs.	II
Fleece Inn; 53.67610°N 1.92925°W		1737	The public house is in stone with quoins at the right end, and a stone slate roof that has a coped gable with kneelers. There are two storeys, a three-bay range, and a former barn that has been incorporated into the public house. The windows are mullioned, the doorway has monolithic jambs and an inscribed lintel, and in the former barn is a blocked segmental arch.	II
Kebroyd Hall; 53.68641°N 1.93881°W	—	1739	The house was altered in about 1854, and has since been converted into flats. It is in stone with an eaves cornice, a slate roof, two storeys, and a U-shaped plan, consisting of a four-bay hall range and four-bay wings. In the main range is a doorway with an architrave, an arched carriage entrance with a keystone and impost, and tall windows. Most of the windows are sashes. In the left wing the windows have architraves, and cornices on consoles. The courtyard is enclosed by stone walls that have an open parapet with roundels, and chamfered gate piers with tapering caps.	II
Barn south of 17 Lane Head Road; 53.68051°N 1.95072°W	—	Mid 18th century (probable)	A stone barn with quoins and a stone slate roof. On the north front is an arched cart entry with moulded imposts, flanked by doorways with heavy lintels. At the rear is a blocked cart entry and a doorway, and in the west gable end is a mullioned window.	II
31/33 Soyland Town Road; 53.68109°N 1.94424°W	—	Mid 18th century	A pair of cottages combined into a house, it is in stone with quoins and has a stone slate roof. There are two storeys and two bays. The doorways have monolithic jambs and the windows are mullioned.	II
Barrit Hill; 53.67963°N 1.95329°W	—	Mid 18th century	A stone house with quoins, and a stone slate roof with a coped gable and the base for a finial on the left. There are two storeys and two bays. In the centre is a doorway with monolithic jambs. The windows have plain surrounds, and contain two lights, one fixed and the other sashed.	II
Gateway to rear of Clough House Farmhouse; 53.68097°N 1.96350°W	—	Mid 18th century	The gateway is in stone, and consists of a segmental arch with monolithic jambs, rusticated voussoirs, a triple keystone, and a moulded impost. It is flanked by walls with slab coping that ramp up over the arch.	II
Fair View; 53.67578°N 1.92946°W	—	Mid 18th century	A row of three cottages with quoins, and stone slate roofs with coped gables and kneelers. There are two storeys, and a parallel rear range. The doorways have monolithic jambs, some windows have single lights, and others are mullioned.	II
Haver Hill; 53.68538°N 1.90306°W	—	Mid 18th century	A pair of cottages, with a third cottage added later in the century. They are in stone with quoins, and a stone slate roof with coped gables. There are two storeys, and each cottage has a single bay, a doorway with monolithic jambs, and mullioned windows.	II
Little Merry Bent; 53.67780°N 1.96519°W	—	Mid 18th century	The house, which was extended in the 19th and 20th centuries, is in stone with quoins and a stone slate roof. There are two storeys, three bays, a rear outshut, and a later single-storey brick extension on the right. The porch is gabled, there are two doorways with monolithic jambs, the windows in the original part are mullioned, and in the 19th-century extension they are sashes.	II
Macpelah House; 53.68288°N 1.96643°W		Mid 18th century	Originally two cottages, a bay was added in the 19th century, and it has been converted into one house. It is in stone with quoins at the west end, and a stone slate roof. There are two storeys, the windows are mullioned, and there are two doorways with monolithic jambs, one at the front and the other at the rear.	II
Mayfield; 53.65854°N 1.96490°W	—	Mid 18th century	The house was extended at each end in the 19th century. It is in stone with quoins and a stone slate roof. There are two storeys and five bays, and the windows are mullioned.	II
Milestone north of junction with Bank Hey Bottom Lane; 53.67220°N 1.93522°W		Mid 18th century	The milestone is on the east side of Elland Road (B6113 road). It is an upright stone with two inscribed faces. One face indicates the distance to Elland, and the other to Rochdale.	II
Milestone southwest of Sandy Clough; 53.68035°N 1.91674°W		Mid 18th century (probable)	The milestone is on the southeast side of Greetland Road (B6113 road). It is an upright stone with two inscribed faces. One face indicates the distance to Elland, and the other, which has been obliterated, probably to Rochdale.	II
Moorfield Farmhouse, Cottage and barn 53.65832°N 1.91914°W	—	Mid 18th century	A pair of cottages, to which a barn was added in the 19th century, the building is in stone with quoins and a stone slate roof. The house has two storeys and three bays. The windows are mullioned, and there are two doorways with monolithic jambs. The barn projects, and contains a segmental-arched cart entry and a doorway to the right.	II
Former New Inn; 53.66854°N 1.98514°W		Mid 18th century	The house, originally a public house, is in stone with quoins and a stone slate roof. There are two storeys, a double-pile plan with two parallel roofs, and a front of three bays. On the front is a modern gabled porch, to the right is a blocked former doorway with monolithic jambs, above which is an arched sundial that is inscribed and dated. The windows are sashes, and at the rear are two Venetian windows, each with a raised impost and a keystone.	II
Over the Bridge Restaurant; 53.67440°N 1.94003°W	—	Mid 18th century	Three cottages converted into a restaurant, it is in stone with quoins and a stone slate roof. There are two storeys and three bays. In the centre are three doorways with monolithic jambs, and the windows are mullioned. On the right return is a later stone flight of stairs leading to an upper floor doorway.	II
Old Bridge; 53.67450°N 1.93994°W		18th century	This is the replacement of a packhorse bridge built in 1553, and it was largely rebuilt in 1973. The bridge is in stone and carries Priest Lane over the River Ryburn. It consists of a single segmental arch, and has an oversailing low parapet with 19th-century cast iron railings. The bridge is also a scheduled monument.	II*
The Malt House; 53.66052°N 1.94951°W		Mid 18th century	The hotel is in stone with quoins and a stone slate roof. There are three storeys and an attic, a symmetrical front of three bays, and two bays at the rear. The central doorway has an architrave, an entablature, and a triangular pediment, and the doorway at the rear has monolithic jambs. The windows on the front are sashes with altered glazing, and at the rear are mullioned windows and a tall stair window.	II
School Green; 53.67614°N 1.91745°W	—	Mid 18th century	A pair of stone cottages with quoins, and a stone slate roof with coped gables and moulded kneelers. There are two storeys, and each cottage has one bay, a doorway with monolithic jambs, and mullioned windows. Above the right doorway is a blank tablet.	II
Stocks in front of 76 Stainland Road; 53.67545°N 1.91130°W	—	18th century (probable)	The stocks in front of the house consist of two upright stones with slots in the sides for a lower stone keeper and an upper wooden keeper.	II
Stone Stile; 53.67974°N 1.90730°W	—	Mid 18th century	A stone house, rendered on the front, with quoins, and a stone slate roof with coped gables and kneelers. There are two storeys and two bays. The doorway is in the right return and has monolithic jambs, and the windows are mullioned.	II
Barn north of Stone Stile; 53.67992°N 1.90722°W	—	Mid 18th century	The barn is in stone with a stone slate roof, an L-shaped plan, and a single aisle on the north side, which contains a tall cart entry. The left return has a wide gable with quoins and rectangular vents. At the rear is an outshut, an altered cart entry, and a blocked doorway with a chamfered surround.	II
The Old Bridge Inn; 53.67470°N 1.94016°W		Mid 18th century	The public house, which contains earlier internal features, is in rendered stone with a stone slate roof. There is a single-storey front range, and a two-storey wing to the left. Some windows are mullioned, others are altered, and the doorway has monolithic jambs.	II
Upper Bottomley Farmhouse; 53.66610°N 1.90739°W	—	Mid 18th century	The farmhouse is in stone with quoins and a stone slate roof. There are two storeys, a double-pile plan under a two-span roof, and a single-storey outshut. The windows are mullioned, and the doorway has monolithic jambs.	II
Barn southwest of Upper Bottomley Farmhouse; 53.66595°N 1.90761°W	—	Mid 18th century (probable)	A stone barn with quoins and a stone slate roof. It has a single aisle, a square-headed cart entry, and two doorways with monolithic jambs. The left return is a wide gable with three triangular vents and a rectangular vent in the apex.	II
Wood Royd Farmhouse, cottage and attached barn 53.67893°N 1.90910°W	—	Mid 18th century	A house and barn that were rebuilt in the 19th century to form three dwellings. The building is in stone with quoins and a stone slate roof. There are two storeys, four bays, and a single-storey rear extension. The windows are mullioned, one doorway has composite jambs, the other doorways have monolithic jambs, and there is a blocked cart entry in the right return.	II
Ivy Houses; 53.67563°N 1.92917°W	—	1751	A group of four cottages, two of them added in the 19th century. They are in stone, and have stone slate roofs with coped gables and kneelers, and two storeys. The earlier cottages have quoins, and the later cottages are back to back. The doorways have monolithic jambs, and the windows are mullioned. At the rear is a decorative date plaque.	II
Lower Beestonhirst; 53.66722°N 1.98109°W	—	1765	A laithe house in stone with quoins and a stone slate roof. There are two storeys, the house has a doorway with monolithic jambs, and the windows are mullioned. The barn to the left contains a segmental-arched cart entry with a keystone, above which is a date tablet with an apron, and to the left is a doorway with monolithic jambs.	II
New Laithe Cottages; 53.66198°N 1.91706°W	—	Mid to late 18th century	A group of four cottages forming a U-shaped plan. They are in stone with stone slate roofs and two storeys. There are two central cottages, the left cottage forms a gabled wing, and the right cottage has a ridge parallel to the central cottage. Most of the windows are mullioned and sashed. The central cottages have paired doorways, and elsewhere is a doorway with monolithic jambs.	II
Rishworth Hall Farmhouse and barn 53.66157°N 1.95557°W	—	Mid to late 18th century (probable)	A laithe house in stone with quoins and a stone slate roof. The house has two storeys and one bay, and it contains a four-light chamfered mullioned window in each floor. The barn projects forward, and has been largely altered.	II
Upper Merry Bent; 53.67778°N 1.96911°W	—	c. 1770	A laithe house in stone with quoins and a stone slate roof. The house has two storeys, two bays, and a single-storey rear outshut. The doorway has a chamfered surround, monolithic jambs, and a segmental-arched lintel, and the windows are mullioned. The barn has a cart entry with a segmental-arched lintel, and composite jambs.	II
Elland Road Bridge; 53.67439°N 1.94025°W		1772	The bridge was originally on the turnpike road, and was widened in the 19th century. It carries Elland Road over the River Ryburn, it is in stone, and consists of a segmental arch with two smaller land bridges to the east. The bridge has voussoirs, a band, and a coped parapet.	II
Barn northeast of No. 3 Heights; 53.67003°N 1.94060°W	—	Late 18th century	A stone barn with quoins, and a stone slate roof with coped gables and moulded kneelers. It contains segmental-arched cart entries, with a mullioned window above, and doorways with tie-stone jambs to the sides. In the gable ends are rectangular vents.	II
184, 186, 190, 192, and 194 Oldham Road; 53.66992°N 1.94738°W	—	Late 18th century	A row of cottages, originally back to back, later through-houses. They are in stone with a stone slate roof. There are three storeys, a double-depth plan, and each cottage has one bay. Apart from one, the doorways are paired, and have monolithic jambs. Some windows are mullioned and some are later replacements.	II
22 and 24 Royd Lane; 53.67679°N 1.94780°W		Late 18th century	A pair of stone houses with quoins and a stone slate roof. There are two storeys and each house has one bay. The doorways are paired in the centre, they have monolithic jambs and heavy lintels. The windows have four lights and are mullioned.	II
Barn northwest of Beeston Hall; 53.66783°N 1.97625°W	—	Late 18th century	A stone barn with quoins, a stone slate roof, and two storeys. It contains a wide elliptical-arched cart entry with monolithic jambs, moulded imposts, and a keystone. There is another similar arch within a portal that has doorways with monolithic jambs. Elsewhere there are mullioned windows, and in the wide gable end is a blocked taking-in door, two tiers of rectangular vents, and an owl hole.	II
Butcher's Arms; 53.66828°N 1.95234°W		Late 18th century	A row of cottages converted into a public house and restaurant, the building is in stone with a stone slate roof, two storeys and an attic, and five bays. The windows are mullioned, and on the front are three doorways with monolithic jambs. On the left return is an external stone staircase leading to an upper floor doorway.	II
Hutch Royd Farmhouse and barn 53.66039°N 1.97582°W	—	Late 18th century	A laithe house in stone with a stone slate roof. The house has two storeys, three bays, and mullioned windows. At the junction with the farm is a later gabled porch. The barn contains a semicircular-arched cart entry, above it is an arched window, to the sides are lunettes, and to the right is a doorway with monolithic jambs.	II
Milestone opposite the Golden Lion Inn; 53.67479°N 1.94113°W		Late 18th century	The milestone is on the junction of Rochdale Road (A58 road) and Elland Road (B6113 road). It is an upright stone with two inscribed faces. One face indicates the distance to Halifax, and the inscription on the other face has been obliterated.	II
Milestone opposite Rycliffe; 53.67876°N 1.93700°W		Late 18th century (probable)	The milestone is on the east side of Halifax Road (A58 road). It is a small upright stone with an arched top and two inscribed faces. One face indicates the distance to Halifax, and the other to Rochdale.	II
Mill Bank Bridge; 53.68726°N 1.94837°W		Late 18th century (probable)	The bridge carries a road over a stream, and the parapets date from the 19th century. It is in stone and consists of a single segmental arch. There is a projecting relieving arch carrying the parapet, which has triangular sectioned coping.	II
New York Farmhouse; 53.67048°N 1.95008°W		Late 18th century	A stone house with quoins, an eaves cornice, and a stone slate roof. There are two storeys, a double-depth plan, and a symmetrical front of three bays. The central doorway has monolithic jambs, a pulvinated frieze, and a triangular pediment, and the windows are sashes.	II
Cottages attached to Penair Filtration Ltd; 53.67402°N 1.94034°W	—	Late 18th century	A row of four stone cottages with quoins and a stone slate roof. There are two storeys, and each cottage has one bay, a doorway with monolithic jambs, and mullioned windows.	II
Pike End Farmhouse and barn 53.65689°N 1.96090°W	—	Late 18th century	A laithe house with two cottages, later converted into a single residence. It is in stone with quoins and a stone slate roof. There are two storeys, and it contains mullioned windows, a gabled porch, a segmental-arched cart entry with a doorway to the right.	II
Cottage to rear of Slitheroe Works; 53.66485°N 1.94816°W	—	Late 18th century	A pair of mirror cottages, later used as offices, they are in stone with a stone slate roof. There are two storeys, and each cottage has one bay, a doorway with tie-stone jambs, and a mullioned window in each floor.	II
The Vicarage; 53.67482°N 1.94059°W		Late 18th century (probable)	A stone house on a plinth, with sill bands, and a hipped stone slate roof. There are two storeys and a front of five bays. The windows are sashes, and in the right return is a tall stair window with a pointed arch.	II
Higher Wormald; 53.66317°N 1.98362°W	—	1796	A laithe house incorporating part of a 17th-century house, it is in stone with quoins and a stone slate roof. The cottage has two storeys, two bays, a doorway with monolithic jambs, and mullioned windows. The barn contains a segmental-arched cart entry with a dated tablet above and doorways to the sides.	II
Denton House; 53.68849°N 1.93580°W		Late 18th or early 19th century	A stone house with rusticated quoins, an eaves cornice, and a slate roof, hipped over the projecting bays. There are three storeys and a front of three bays. The right bay has a semi-octagonal projection with windows in three sides, and there is a similar projection on the left return. In the middle bay is a doorway with an architrave, and a cornice on consoles. The windows have plain surrounds and are small-paned with upper casements.	II
Pinfold; 53.67836°N 1.92068°W	—	Late 18th or early 19th century	The pinfold is in stone, and it consists of an oval enclosure with monolithic gate piers at the entrance.	II
Barn, wall and gate piers north-northwest of The Howroyde; 53.67242°N 1.91351°W	—	Late 18th or early 19th century	The barn is in stone with quoins, a stone slate roof, and six bays. It contains a segmental-arched cart entry with a two-light mullioned window above, single-light windows to the sides, and a doorway with monolithic jambs to the right. In the gable ends are three tiers of vents. The barn is in a courtyard that has stone walls with half-round copings, and at the south is a gateway that has rusticated piers surmounted by pyramids.	II
Rishworth Baptist Church; 53.65946°N 1.94954°W		1803	The chapel is in stone with a stone slate roof, two storeys, three bays, and a gabled organ loft at the rear. The outer bays contain doorways with monolithic jambs, in the middle bay is a tripartite window, and the upper floor contains single light windows, all with altered glazing. The windows in the organ loft have round-arched heads.	II
1/3, 5 and 7 Halifax Road; 53.68820°N 1.93555°W		Early 19th century	A row of stone cottages with a stone slate roof and two storeys. The doorways have monolithic jambs, some of the windows are mullioned, and others are replacements. On the left return is a two-storey segmental bay window.	II
1/3 Mill Fold; 53.67429°N 1.93991°W		Early 19th century	A pair of cottages with a basement warehouse converted into a single dwelling. It is in stone with a stone slate roof, three storeys, and three bays. In the first bay is a segmental-arched cart entry with a dropped keystone, the middle bay contains a stone staircase with cast iron railings leading to paired doorways with monolithic jambs, and the windows are mullioned.	II
Ashgrove and barn 53.67598°N 1.92804°W	—	Early 19th century	The farmhouse and attached barn are in stone, partly rendered, and have a stone slate roof. There are two storeys, a double-depth plan, and each part has two bays. The windows are mullioned, and the barn contains a segmental-arched cart entry, with a single light above, and a doorway to the right with monolithic jambs.	II
Barn at Aufhole; 53.68644°N 1.94755°W	—	Early 19th century	The barn is in stone with a stone slate roof. It contains a segmental-arched cart entry with a mullioned window above, blocked doorways with monolithic jambs to the sides, and lunettes under the eaves and in the apex of the gable.	II
Bridge End; 53.65808°N 1.94721°W	—	Early 19th century	A row of three stone cottages with a stone slate roof. There are three storeys, and each cottage has a single bay. The entrances are in the middle floor from a gallery, and the doorways have monolithic jambs. The windows on the front consist of a narrow light and a wide light, with cruciform glazing, and at the rear are small square windows.	II
Bridge End House; 53.67427°N 1.93980°W		Early 19th century	A stone house with a stone slate roof, two storeys and four bays. There are two doorways with monolithic jambs, and the windows have plain surrounds.	II
Dyson Field House; 53.66962°N 1.95159°W		Early 19th century	A stone house on a plinth, with sill bands, an eaves cornice, and a hipped tile roof. There are two storeys and a symmetrical front of five bays. The central doorway has monolithic jambs, a fanlight, and a segmental pediment on consoles. The windows are sashes with 16 panes.	II
Milestone west of Beestonhirst; 53.66861°N 1.97900°W	—	Early 19th century	The milestone is on the south side of Rochdale Road (A58 road). It is a small upright stone inscribed on two faces. The milestone indicates the distances to Rochdale and Halifax.	II
Barn west of Paddock Nook; 53.66938°N 1.94244°W	—	Early 19th century	A stone barn with a stone slate roof. It contains a segmental-arched cart entry with a keystone, over which is a window with a segmental-arched lintel, a keystone, and Gothic glazing. To the sides and in the gables are lunettes with keystones, and to the right is a doorway with monolithic jambs.	II
Wall and gate piers, Rishworth Baptist Church; 53.65946°N 1.94933°W		Early 19th century	The wall enclosing the forecourt of the church is in stone, with dressed copings, and cast iron railings with fleur-de-lys. The gate piers are in stone and have pyramidal coping, the gates are in wrought iron, and above them is an overthrow.	II
Wood End House; 53.68477°N 1.95431°W	—	Early 19th century	A stone house with quoins with a stone slate house. There are two storeys, a double-depth plan, and three bays. The two doorways have monolithic jambs, the windows at the rear are mullioned, and in the front they have altered glazing.	II
Leyfield Farmhouse; 53.64909°N 1.91327°W	—	1826	The farmhouse and barn are in stone, and have a stone slate roof. There are two storeys, most of the windows are mullioned, and others are single lights. The entrances to the house and to the barn have stone surrounds.	II
Heald Wall Nook Cottage; 53.67833°N 1.92102°W	—	1827	Originally the parish workhouse, later a private house, it is in stone with a stone slate roof. There are two storeys, and two bays. The doorway is in the centre, it is flanked by two-light mullioned windows, and in the upper floor are square windows.	II
Old Building, Rishworth School; 53.66338°N 1.95005°W		1827–28	This part of the school building is used as the headmaster's office, School House, and dormitories. The school was designed by John Oates in Late Georgian style. It is in stone, on a plinth, with hipped slate roofs, a symmetrical front, and a U-shaped plan. The front consists of a central block with two storeys and seven bays, flanked by connecting wings with two storeys and four bays, and outer pavilions with three storeys and three bays, and the returns have eight bays. The central block has a pediment over the middle three bays with a window in the tympanum, a colonnade with square pillars, imposts, and segmental arches, and on the roof is a weathervane. The windows have gauged lintels, and twelve-paned sashes.	II
Rishworth Congregational Chapel; 53.66031°N 1.97707°W		1832	The chapel is in stone with a stone slate roof, a symmetrical front of three bays, and a rear outshut. The central doorway has monolithic jambs and a flat lintel, over which is a foliated inscribed and dated cartouche. The small window above this and the tall windows in the outer bays have round heads and marginal glazing. Under the eaves are three rectangular openings, the outer ones glazed, the middle one blind. Inside the chapel are box pews.	II
4 and 6 Old Bank and barn 53.67407°N 1.93871°W		Early to mid 19th century	A group of cottages and a barn converted into a museum, they are in stone, partly rendered, and with a stone slate roof. The cottages are joined by an archway with a room above, and No. 4 has quoins, a doorway with tie-stone jambs, and sash windows. In the former barn are an altered cart entry and rectangular vents.	II
Brookside House and Cottage; 53.68644°N 1.94904°W	—	Early to mid 19th century	A house, later divided, it is in stone with quoins, and a hipped stone slate roof. There are two storeys and three bays, and two doorways, one blocked, with monolithic jambs. The windows are mullioned, and contain sashes.	II
The Old Water Mill; 53.68711°N 1.94833°W		Early to mid 19th century	The former watermill, which has been converted into flats, is in stone with a stone slate roof. There are two storeys and an attic, five bays on the gabled front facing the road, six bays on the returns, and a single-bay rear extension. The doorway has tie-stone jambs, the small-pane windows have plain surrounds, and at the rear is a blocked Venetian window.	II
Barn east of Baitings; 53.66760°N 1.99515°W	—	1840	The barn is in stone, and has a stone slate roof with coped gables. On both sides is an arched cart entry with a keystone, a segmental-arched window above, lunettes to the sides, and doorways with monolithic jambs at the ends. On the south front is a datestone over the cart entry, and the gable ends contain a rectangular vent and an owl hole.	II
Lodge, Rishworth New Mill; 53.65843°N 1.94636°W	—	Mid 19th century	The lodge, which is in Italianate style, is in stone with quoins, an eaves cornice on moulded brackets, and a hipped slate roof. There is a single storey, a symmetrical front of three bays, and two-bay returns. In the centre is a doorway with channelled pilasters, imposts, a semicircular-headed fanlight, and a triangular pediment. The outer bays contain two-light arched windows with mullions, pilasters, and capitals.	II
Milestone opposite Rishworth School; 53.66305°N 1.94912°W		Mid 19th century	The milestone is on the east side of Oldham Road (A672 road), and has lettering in cast iron. It has an arched top and two faces lower down. In the arched top is inscribed "OLDHAM & RIPPONDEN ROAD" and "RISHWORTH", and on the lower faces are the distances to Oldham, Ripponden, Manchester and Halifax. It also gives the name of the manufacturer "BRAYSHAW & BOOTH, MAKERS LIVERSEDGE".	II
Milestone opposite Don Marie Booth Wood; 53.65026°N 1.94884°W		Mid 19th century	The milestone is on the southeast side of Oldham Road (A672 road), and has lettering in cast iron. It has an arched top and two faces lower down. In the arched top is inscribed "OLDHAM & RIPPONDEN ROAD" and "RISHWORTH", and on the lower faces are the distances to Oldham, Ripponden, Manchester and Halifax. It also gives the name of the manufacturer "BRAYSHAW & BOOTH, MAKERS LIVERSEDGE".	II
Milestone east of Little London; 53.64265°N 1.96685°W		Mid 19th century	The milestone is on the south side of Oldham Road (A672 road), and has lettering in cast iron. It has an arched top and two faces lower down. In the arched top is inscribed "OLDHAM & RIPPONDEN ROAD" and "RISHWORTH", and on the lower faces are the distances to Oldham, Ripponden, Manchester and Halifax.	II
Milestone northeast of Oxygrains Bridge; 53.64105°N 1.98932°W		Mid 19th century	The milestone is on the south side of Oldham Road (A672 road), and has lettering in cast iron. It has an arched top and two faces lower down. In the arched top is inscribed "OLDHAM & RIPPONDEN ROAD" and "RISHWORTH", and on the lower faces are the distances to Oldham, Ripponden, Manchester and Halifax.	II
Milestone northeast of Spa Bridge; 53.63332°N 2.01205°W		Mid 19th century	The milestone is on the south side of Oldham Road (A672 road), and has lettering in cast iron. It has an arched top and two faces lower down. In the arched top is inscribed "OLDHAM & RIPPONDEN ROAD" and "RISHWORTH", and on the lower faces are the distances to Oldham, Ripponden, Manchester and Halifax.	II
Milestone east of junction with Turvin Road; 53.66064°N 2.02582°W	—	Mid 19th century	The milestone is on the south side of Rochdale Road (A58 road). It is an upright stone inscribed on two faces. The milestone indicates the distances to Rochdale and Halifax.	II
Milestone to front of Stony Lea; 53.67754°N 1.91571°W	—	Mid 19th century	The milestone is on the southeast side of Saddleworth Road (B6114 road), and has lettering in cast iron. It has an arched top and two faces lower down. In the arched top is inscribed "ELLAND & SADDLEWORTH ROAD" and "BARKISLAND", and on the lower faces are the distances to Rochdale, Junction, and Elland.	II
Milestone south of Ringstone Royd; 53.66475°N 1.92507°W		Mid 19th century	The milestone is on the east side of Saddleworth Road (B6114 road), and has lettering in cast iron. It has an arched top and two faces lower down. In the arched top is inscribed "ELLAND & SADDLEWORTH ROAD" and "BARKISLAND", and on the lower faces are the distances to Rochdale, Junction, and Elland.	II
Milestone west of Pike Plain; 53.65117°N 1.92895°W		Mid 19th century	The milestone is on the west side of Saddleworth Road (B6114 road), and has lettering in cast iron. It has an arched top and two faces lower down. In the arched top is inscribed "ELLAND & SADDLEWORTH ROAD" and "BARKISLAND", and on the lower faces are the distances to Rochdale, Junction, and Elland.	II
Weir, mill race, mill dam, and sluice gates, Rishworth Mill; 53.65559°N 1.94685°W	—	Mid 19th century	The water management system for the mill includes a weir, from which a leat runs off to a sluice gate, which has iron uprights and stone plates. The dam has an elongated oval shape, and a stone-lined inlet runs to another sluice gate, and there is an overflow channel.	II
Christ Church, Barkisland; 53.67542°N 1.91941°W		1852–54	The church is in stone with a slate roof, and consists of a nave, north and south aisles, a south porch, and a chancel. The porch has a doorway with a pointed arch, a coped gable, and a cross finial. The windows have pointed arches, and on the west gable is a bellcote.	II
Rishworth New Mill; 53.65788°N 1.94664°W		c. 1864	The former mill is in stone with quoins, hipped slate roofs, four storeys, and 19 bays. In the fifth bay is a large semicircular-arched doorway with a keystone, rusticated vermiculated voussoirs, and a moulded cornice. Above this is a square clock tower with corner pilasters, a projecting cornice on consoles, and circular clock faces. The windows have monolithic lintels, there is a taking-in door, and further doorways with semicircular-arched heads and rusticated voussoirs.	II
Barkisland Infant School; 53.67641°N 1.92068°W	—	1867	The school, which was extended in 1895, and headmaster's house are in stone, and have slate roofs with coped gables. The school consists of a central hall with flanking wings, and gabled porches containing doorways with pointed heads. The house has one storey and an attic, a doorway with a pointed arch and decorative ironwork, mullioned and transomed windows, and gabled dormers with cross windows.	II
St Bartholomew's Church; 53.67451°N 1.93923°W		1867–68	The church, which is in Decorated style, is built in stone with a stone slate roof. It consists of a nave with a clerestory, north and south aisles, north and south transeptal chapels, a chancel, and a southwest steeple. The steeple has a three-stage tower with angle buttresses, a south doorway, clock faces, and a tall octagonal broach spire with lucarnes.	II
Gate piers and wall, St Bartholomew's Church; 53.67435°N 1.93947°W	—	1868	Enclosing the churchyard are stone walls with copings and cast iron railings. There are two pairs of stone gate piers in Gothic Revival style. Each pier has gablets on each face with carved decoration in the tympanum and a finial.	II
Congregational Church and Sunday School; 53.67029°N 1.94780°W		1869–70	The former church and Sunday school are in stone with a slate roof, and are in French Gothic style. The church consist of a nave, a gabled transept, a vestry with a hipped roof, a narthex with a projecting porch that has a small apse with a conical roof. Above the porch is a bell turret that broaches to an octagon and has a pyramidal roof. In the church is a rose window, and the other windows have pointed heads. The attached Sunday school has a gabled hipped roof and a half-dormer.	II
Rishworth Lodge; 53.64537°N 1.96274°W		c. 1870	A shooting lodge designed by William Henry Crossland, it has been divided into flats. The building is in stone with stone slate roofs, and has two storeys and attics. In the south front are three bays, the first two with coped gables and elaborate kneelers. The first bay contains a porch with a trefoil on corbelled jambs, the doorway has a shouldered lintel, and on the side is a coat of arms. In the second bay is a canted bay window with a quatrefoil in the apex. The windows are cross windows, some with hood moulds. At the rear is an outshut containing stars, which has stepped windows that are arched and have trefoil heads.	II
Wheelhouse (east), Ringstone Edge Reservoir; 53.65870°N 1.92327°W		1886	The wheelhouse on the east side of the reservoir is a cylindrical structure in stone. It contains an arched doorway with a keystone, a heavy cornice, and has a hemi-spherical dome surmounted by a solid parapet with an iron crown.	II
Wheelhouse (west), Ringstone Edge Reservoir; 53.65733°N 1.92763°W		1886	The wheelhouse on the west side of the reservoir is a cylindrical structure in stone. It contains an arched doorway with a keystone, a heavy cornice, and has a hemi-spherical dome surmounted by a solid parapet with an iron crown.	II
Ripponden War Memorial; 53.67412°N 1.94257°W		c. 1922	The war memorial stands near a road junction. It consists of a granite plinth on which is a statue in stone of a soldier in battledress holding a rifle. The plinth is in the form of a tapering four-sided obelisk with a marble inset slab on each face inscribed with the names of those lost in the two World Wars.	II
Rishworth War Memorial; 53.65907°N 1.94938°W		1923	The memorial consists of a triangular garden at a road junction containing a block of local millstone grit. This stands on an octagonal concrete base containing a rockery and a plinth in the form of a wreath. On the block are plaques with inscriptions and the names of those lost in the two World Wars. Around this are planted areas, and the garden is enclosed by stone walls with flat-topped coping and square gate piers.	II
