= Soyland =

Coordinates: 53°40′49″N 1°56′34″W

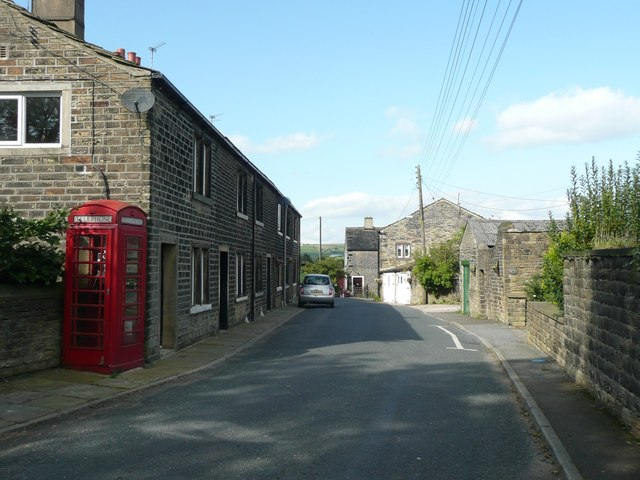
- Entrance to Soyland Town

- Location within West Yorkshire
- Civil parish: Ripponden
- Metropolitan borough: Calderdale
- Metropolitan county: West Yorkshire
- Region: Yorkshire and the Humber
- Country: England
- Sovereign state: United Kingdom
- Police: West Yorkshire
- Fire: West Yorkshire
- Ambulance: Yorkshire

Soyland is a village in the civil parish of Ripponden, in Calderdale, West Yorkshire, England. It is just north of Ripponden off the A58 road and is 5 miles (8 km) south west of Halifax. The village referred to as Soyland Town, used to be the site of several textile mills, but these have closed down. The walking route Calderdale Way passes through the area. The name Soyland derives from the Middle English soghland meaning 'boggy land'.

== Governance ==
Soyland was formerly a township in the parish of Halifax, in 1866 Soyland became a separate civil parish, in 1894 Soyland became an urban district, on 1 April 1937 the urban district and parish were abolished, the urban district was merged with Ripponden Urban District and the parish was merged with Ripponden. In 1931 the parish had a population of 3059.
