= JLA (company) =

UK business

JLA Group
- Formerly: John Laithwaite Associates
- Type: Private Limited Company
- Industry: Manufacturing and Service
- Founded: 1973
- Headquarters: Ripponden, England
- Products: Commercial equipment, regulatory compliance tools, Laundry equipment, catering equipment, OTEX infection control, medical equipment & detergents, Fire & Security Systems, Passive Fire Doors, Fire Risk Assessments, Automatic Opening Vents(AOV)
- Revenue: ▲GBP£42.9 million (2015); GBP£27.5 million (2014)
- Operating income: ▲GBP£3.6 million (2015); GBP£1.6 million (2014)
- Total assets: ▲GBP£8.9 million (2015); GBP£5.0 million(2014)
- Number of employees: 800
- Parent: JLA Equityco Limited
- Website: jla.com

The JLA Group is a provider of the distribution, rental and servicing of commercial laundry equipment, commercial dishwashers and regulatory compliance tools as well as Fire & Security Systems, Passive Fire Doors, Fire Risk Assessments, Automatic Opening Vents (AOV). The company is the market-leading distributor of commercial laundry and catering equipment in the UK, having recorded circa 30 per cent market share in 2011. Founded in 1973, JLA is based in Ripponden, West Yorkshire, UK.

== History ==
JLA was founded as John Laithwaite Associates Limited in 1973 in Ripponden, West Yorkshire, UK by John Laithwaite. While JLA initially specialised only in commercial laundry equipment distribution, by 1982 the company had begun to offer a rental model combining both machines and servicing which is now known as Total Care.

In April 2002, JLA acquired Circuit Managed Laundry, which is now a fully incorporated division of JLA. Circuit provides managed laundry rooms for residential buildings (such as university campuses, holiday parks and housing associations) throughout the UK.

In 2010, JLA expanded with a division named Black Box Intelligence. This division was established as an umbrella brand for its new compliance and building management system products, Legionella Intelligence and Boiler Intelligence.

In February 2011, JLA secured a £12.5 million funding package from Lloyds Banking Group Corporate Markets. The package consisted of £7.5 million for capital expenditure and a £5 million working capital facility.

JLA added a detergents division, JLA Clean, in 2011, and introduced a warewashing division in 2012. In 2013, the company launched its medical and catering divisions, and launched a commercial heating division in 2017.

=== Acquisition by HgCapital ===
On 26 March 2010, HgCapital announced that they had acquired a majority stake in JLA Limited. The deal was valued between £150 million and £175 million, and the acquisition attracted national attention, with both The Telegraph and Reuters covering the story.

=== JLA Acquisitions ===
JLA has made a number of acquisitions since 2010. In 2011, the company acquired Mason of Blackpool, a regional commercial equipment distributor. In 2013, JLA acquired the Carford Group, a major catering equipment distributor and service supplier , followed by PHS Laundryserv in July 2015.

Other businesses acquired by JLA include Red Squared, Wilson’s Electrics, CKM, Harmony Business and Technology, Proton Washrite, Newco and Comcat Engineering.

In May 2017, the company acquired rival laundry provider Washstation, however, in 2018 it was ordered to sell the company by the Competition and Markets Authority.

== Products and services ==
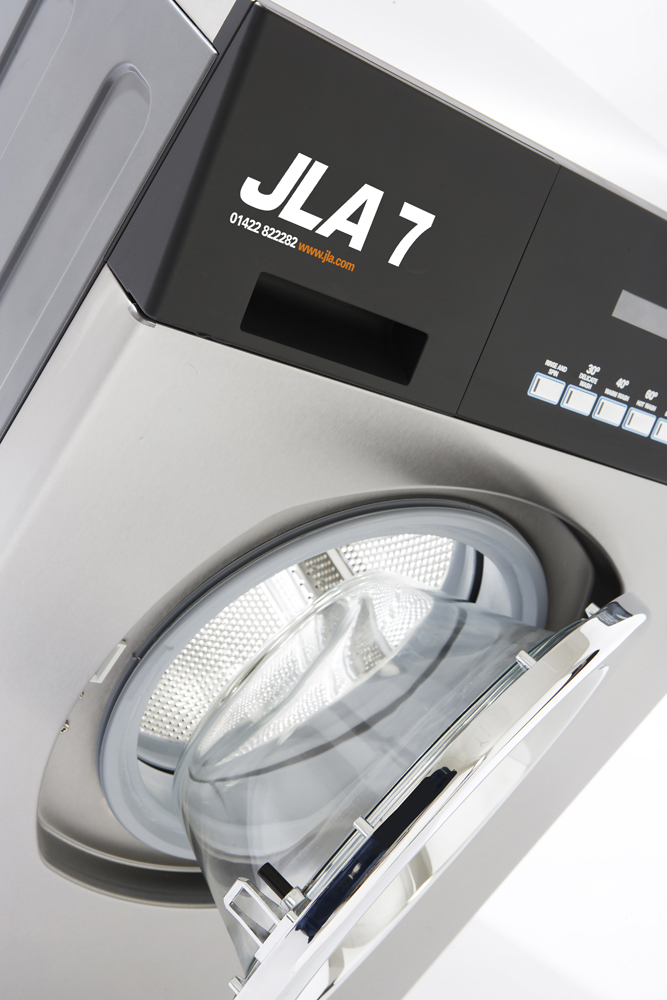
JLA7 Washing Machine

As a commercial equipment supplier, JLA distributes its own branded machines, which includes washers, tumble dryers, catering equipment, dishwashers, sluice room equipment, commercial boilers and hot water cylinders.

The company's main service offering is Total Care, a comprehensive equipment and service package. JLA also offers breakdown-only repairs, as well as contract-based breakdown insurance and service plans.

In November 2001, JLA launched their S.A.F.E. (an acronym for Sensor Activated Fire Extinguishing) system for tumble dryers. The system works by utilising two sensors which constantly monitor the temperature in the dryer drum, and which activate a water vapour mechanism that extinguishes the fire before it can escape the drum.

OTEX, JLA's ozone disinfection system for laundry OTEX, was launched in June 2004, following a £3m investment programme. In 2009 OTEX received level 1 classification from the Department of Health NHS Rapid Review Panel for its infection control qualities. The report stated that OTEX is ‘the most effective laundry disinfection system for eradicating microorganisms, including bacteria, yeasts, moulds and viruses'.

In September 2010, the company launched two new products through its newly formed division Black Box Intelligence. Legionella Intelligence was developed as a wireless web-based system for monitoring the prevalence of Legionella via temperature sensors. Boiler Intelligence is a building management system which controls heating and boiler activity in properties.

JLA launched its SMART Wash range in 2013. The washing machines incorporate ‘JLA Sense’ technology to automatically gauge the amount of water needed during a wash cycle. This was followed in 2014 by the SMART Dry range of tumble dryers, which feature S.A.F.E. technology and are programmed to calculate how long it will take for individual loads to dry.

== Awards ==
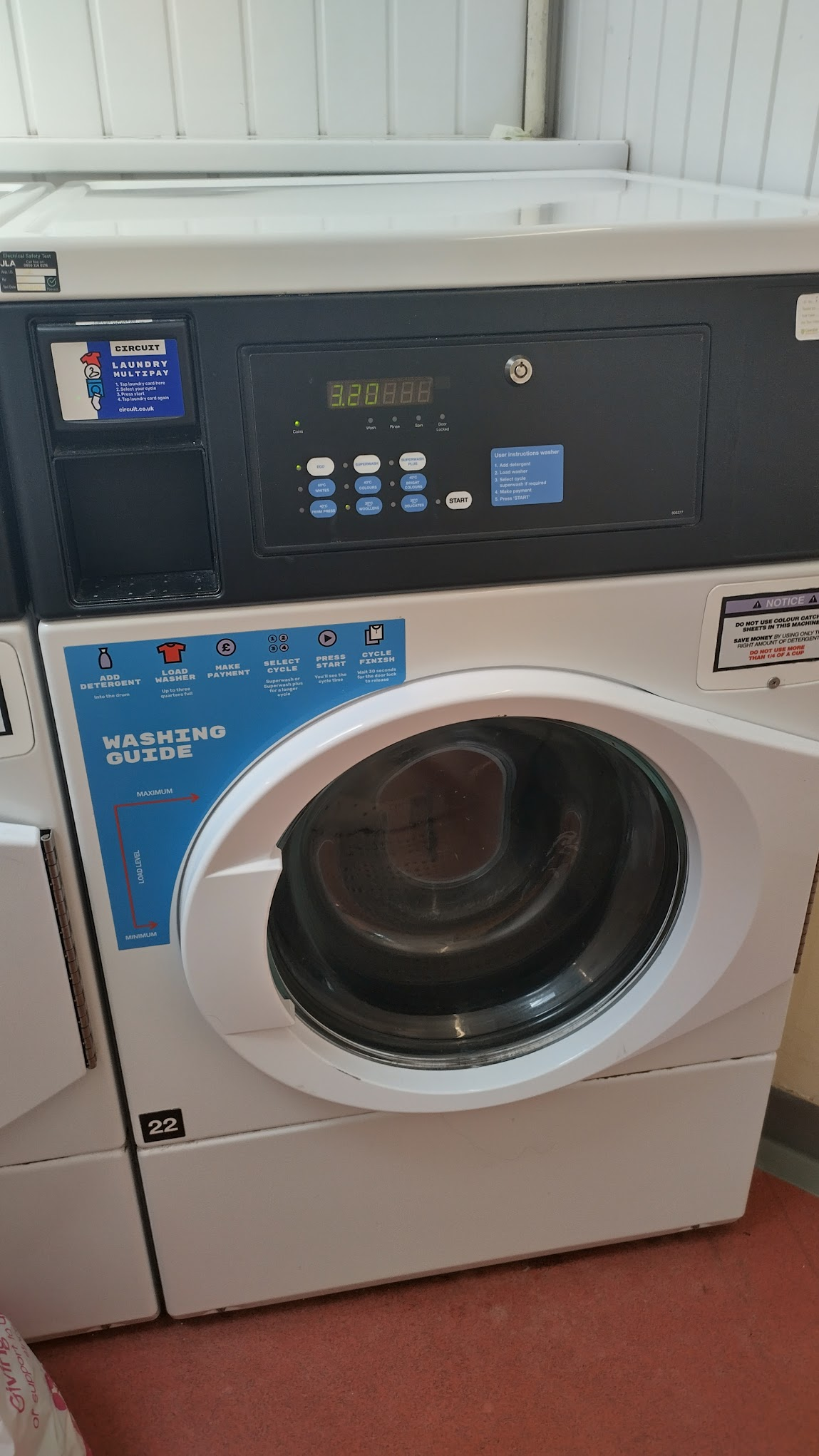
Circuit Laundry washing machine in the University of York

JLA won the National Customer Service Award for Field Management in 2008.

In 2009, the Department of Health NHS Rapid Review Panel awarded JLA’s OTEX ozone laundry system level 1 classification for infection control products.

JLA were shortlisted for the Yorkshire Innovator award for the Yorkshire Business Masters’ Awards in June 2010.

== Criticisms ==
Circuit Managed Laundry has attracted criticisms from the student population for its in house laundry systems on university campuses.

Warwick University replaced most of its Circuit laundries with facilities from WashCO following negative student feedback.
