= Barkisland =

Village in West Yorkshire, England

Coordinates: 53.677141°N 1.918973°W

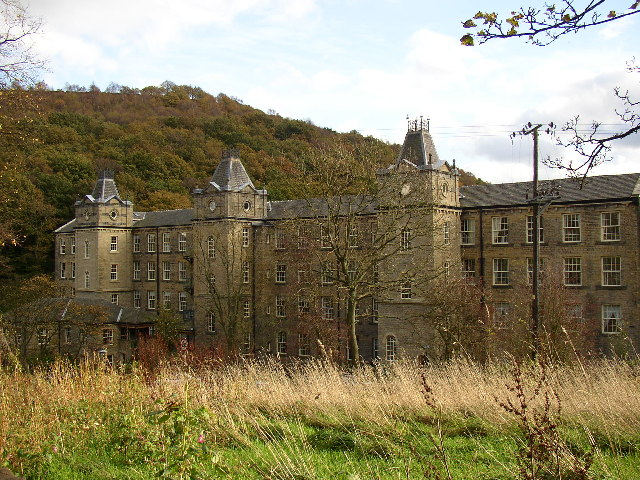
- Barkisland Mill

- Location within West Yorkshire
- OS grid reference: SE054200
- Civil parish: Ripponden
- Metropolitan borough: Calderdale
- Metropolitan county: West Yorkshire
- Region: Yorkshire and the Humber
- Country: England
- Sovereign state: United Kingdom
- Post town: HALIFAX
- Postcode district: HX4
- Dialling code: 01422
- Police: West Yorkshire
- Fire: West Yorkshire
- Ambulance: Yorkshire
- UK Parliament: Calder Valley

Barkisland (/ˈbɑːkɪslənd/) is a village in civil parish of Ripponden, in the Calderdale district, in West Yorkshire, England. Historically part of the West Riding of Yorkshire, it is one mile (1.5 kilometres) east of Ripponden, two miles (three kilometres) south of Sowerby Bridge and four miles (six kilometres) southwest of Halifax town centre.

The village is in the Ryburn ward of Calderdale. Barkisland has a school, a church, a post office and a cricket club that plays in the Huddersfield Cricket League. There are two pubs in Barkisland, The Fleece Countryside Inn and The Griffin Inn.

== History ==
A ten-thousand-year-old axe was discovered near Ringstone Reservoir, providing evidence of human activity in the area now known as Barkisland dating back to the Stone Age. The origin of the name is in dispute. In a book of place names printed in 1944 it was stated that Barkisland derived from it being a settlement ('land') of a chieftain called 'Barkis'. While much earlier, in 1789, the Rev. John Watson, vicar of Ripponden church between 1754 and 1769, theorised that "Barsey or Barkesey are Anglo-Saxon words meaning low-lying enclosures where birches grow. It also is the Anglo-Saxon for a district where there are wolves."

=== Industry ===
Bowers Mill was built in the 18th century as a water-powered fulling mill. It has also been used as a corn mill, a worsted mill and a woollen mill. Textiles manufacturer J. & S. Taylor Ltd occupied the mill from 1882 to 1991 before moving production to Sowerby Bridge. The mill has now been converted for smaller businesses.

Barkisland Mill, a six-storey building, was used for textile production in the 19th and 20th centuries. At the start of the 21st century it was converted into residential flats. Bottomley's Mill, a cotton mill, was recorded when a fire broke out there on 13 January 1871.

== Governance ==
Barkisland is part of the Ryburn ward of Calderdale, a metropolitan borough within the ceremonial county of West Yorkshire in England.

It was a township and chapelry in the parish of Halifax, from 1866 Barkisland was a civil parish. Barkisland was part of the Halifax Registration District from 1 July 1837. In 1931 the parish population was 1552. It was abolished as a parish on 1 April 1937 and merged with the neighbouring parish of Ripponden.

== Geography ==
Barkisland is situated on a hilltop that gently rises from Greetland in the north-east and declines westwards to Ripponden and eastwards to Stainland. The hill continues to climb southwards towards Scammonden.

== Landmarks ==
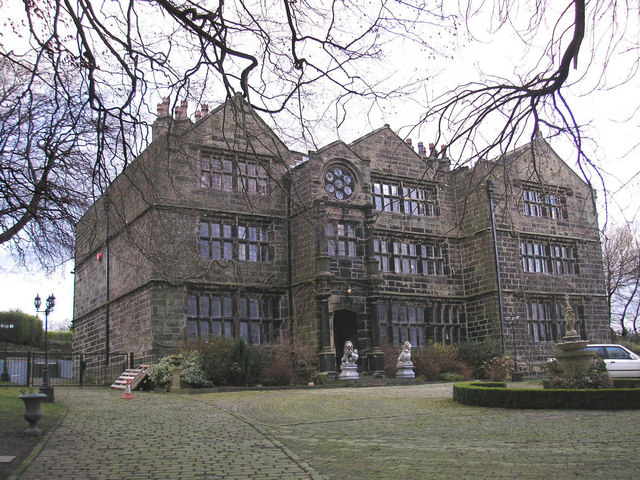
Barkisland Hall

The village stocks are located on Stainland Road roughly 550 yards east of the post office and are a Grade II listed structure.

Part of the Anglican Diocese of Wakefield, Christ Church is Barkisland's only church has links to the nearby school.

Barkisland Hall is a grade I listed country house built for John Gledhill in 1638, constructed in stone in three storeys to an F-shaped floor plan. It was bought in 1967 by Lord Kagan to provide accommodation for his textile company, that made Gannex raincoats.

== Education ==
Barkisland Junior and Infant school serves the village. Barkisland School Association (BSA) is a parent-teacher organisation supporting the school by organising events and fundraising.

== See also ==
- Listed buildings in Ripponden
