= John Rushworth (surgeon) =

English surgeon

- Born: 1669
- Died: 6 December 1736 (aged 66–67)
- Occupation: Surgeon

John Rushworth (1669 – 6 December 1736) was an English surgeon.

== Biography ==
Rushworth was born in 1669, was son of Thomas Rushworth, vicar of St. Sepulchre, Northampton, during 1666, and afterwards vicar of Guilsborough in Northamptonshire. John qualified as a surgeon, and lived in Northampton, where he attained to considerable practice. He is eminent for the discovery of the efficacy of cinchona bark in cases of gangrene, a discovery which was utilised by John Ranby some years later. This discovery Rushworth first made known to Sir Hans Sloane in 1721, but he subsequently communicated it to the master and wardens of the Company of Barber-Surgeons for the use of the profession at large.

Rushworth shares with Garth the honour of being one of the first to suggest the foundation of infirmaries and dispensaries in the centre of every county and town, and he was especially earnest in endeavouring to carry this project into effect in Northamptonshire. But the infirmary for that county was not established till 1743, some six years after his death. Rushworth was especially desirous of advancing the surgical art, which he called the ‘ancientest and certainest part of physic.’ He died on 6 December 1736 and is buried in the church of All Saints, Northampton, where a tablet was placed in his memory, and to that of his wife Jane, heiress of Daniel Danvers of Northampton, doctor of medicine, and sister of Knightly Danvers, recorder of Northampton. She predeceased Rushworth on 3 July 1725.

The names of the ten children of the family are recorded on the tablet to the memory of the mother.

Rushworth published:

- ‘The Case of the late James Keill, Dr. of Physic, represented by J. R.,’ Oxford, 8vo, 1719; reprinted in Beckett's ‘Tracts,’ p. 62.
- ‘A Letter to the Mrs. or Governors of the Mystery and Commonalty of Barber-Surgeons,’ Northampton? 1731, 8vo.
- ‘A Proposal for the Improvement of Surgery; offered to the Masters of the Mystery of Barbers and Surgeons at London,’ London, 1732, 8vo.
- ‘Two Letters showing the great advantage of the Bark in Mortifications,’ London, 1732, 12mo.
