= Ripponden =

Village and civil parish in West Yorkshire, England

Coordinates: 53.672°N 1.946°W

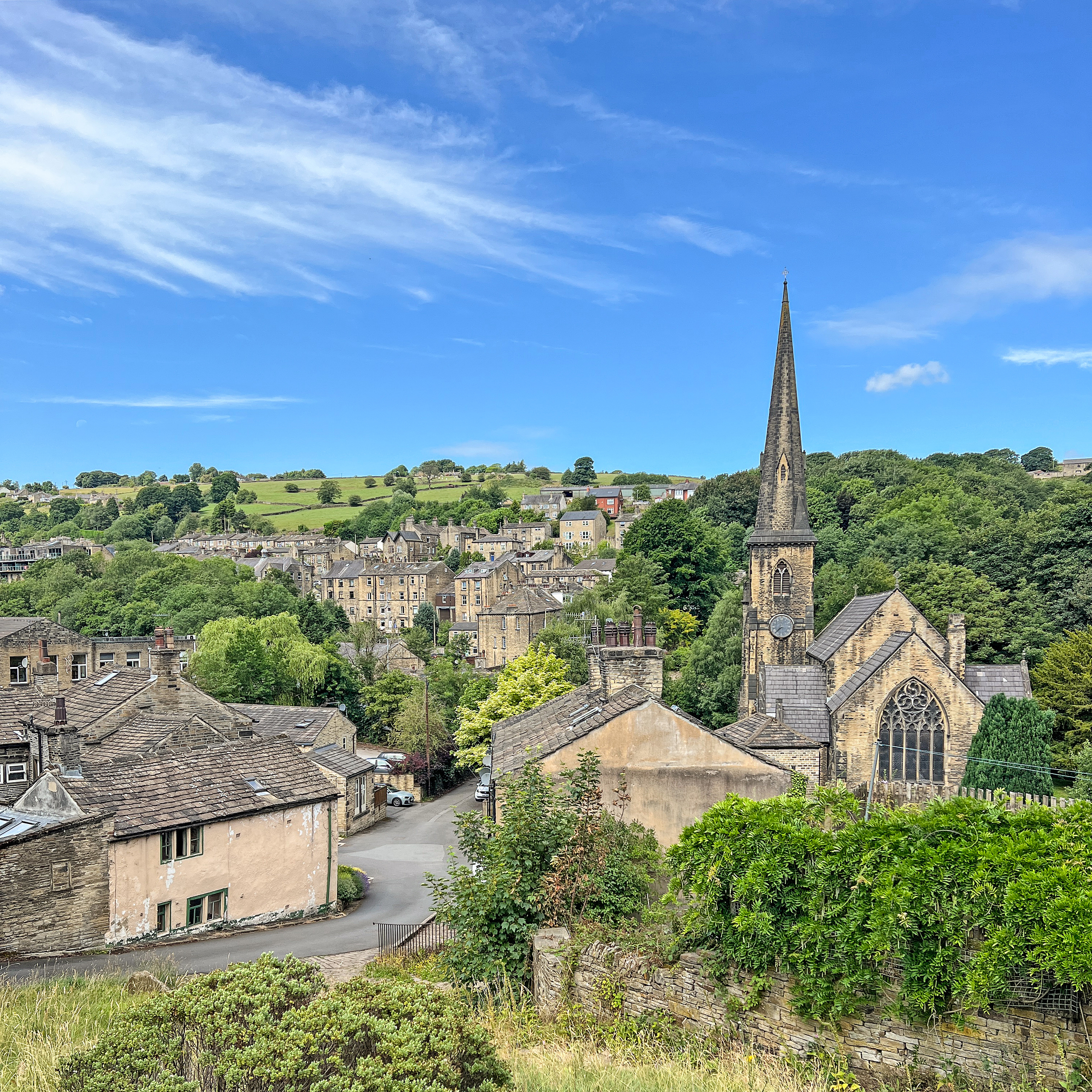
- Ripponden

- Location within West Yorkshire
- Population: 7,421 (2011 census)
- OS grid reference: SE035195
- Civil parish: Ripponden
- Metropolitan borough: Calderdale
- Metropolitan county: West Yorkshire
- Region: Yorkshire and the Humber
- Country: England
- Sovereign state: United Kingdom
- Post town: SOWERBY BRIDGE
- Postcode district: HX6
- Dialling code: 01422
- Police: West Yorkshire
- Fire: West Yorkshire
- Ambulance: Yorkshire
- UK Parliament: Calder Valley

Ripponden is a village and civil parish on the River Ryburn near Halifax in West Yorkshire, England. Historically it was part of the West Riding of Yorkshire. Its population was 6,412 at the time of the 2001 Census, and 7,421 in 2011.

Ripponden is the main settlement in a small group of villages (Barkisland, Ripponden, Rishworth and Soyland) whose citizens are represented on Ripponden Parish Council. The area is a substantial part of the Ryburn Ward, itself part of Calderdale metropolitan borough.

The area is of archaeological note as it is rich in Neolithic and Bronze Age remains. At nearby Ringstone Edge can be found a small stone circle.

== Facilities and services ==
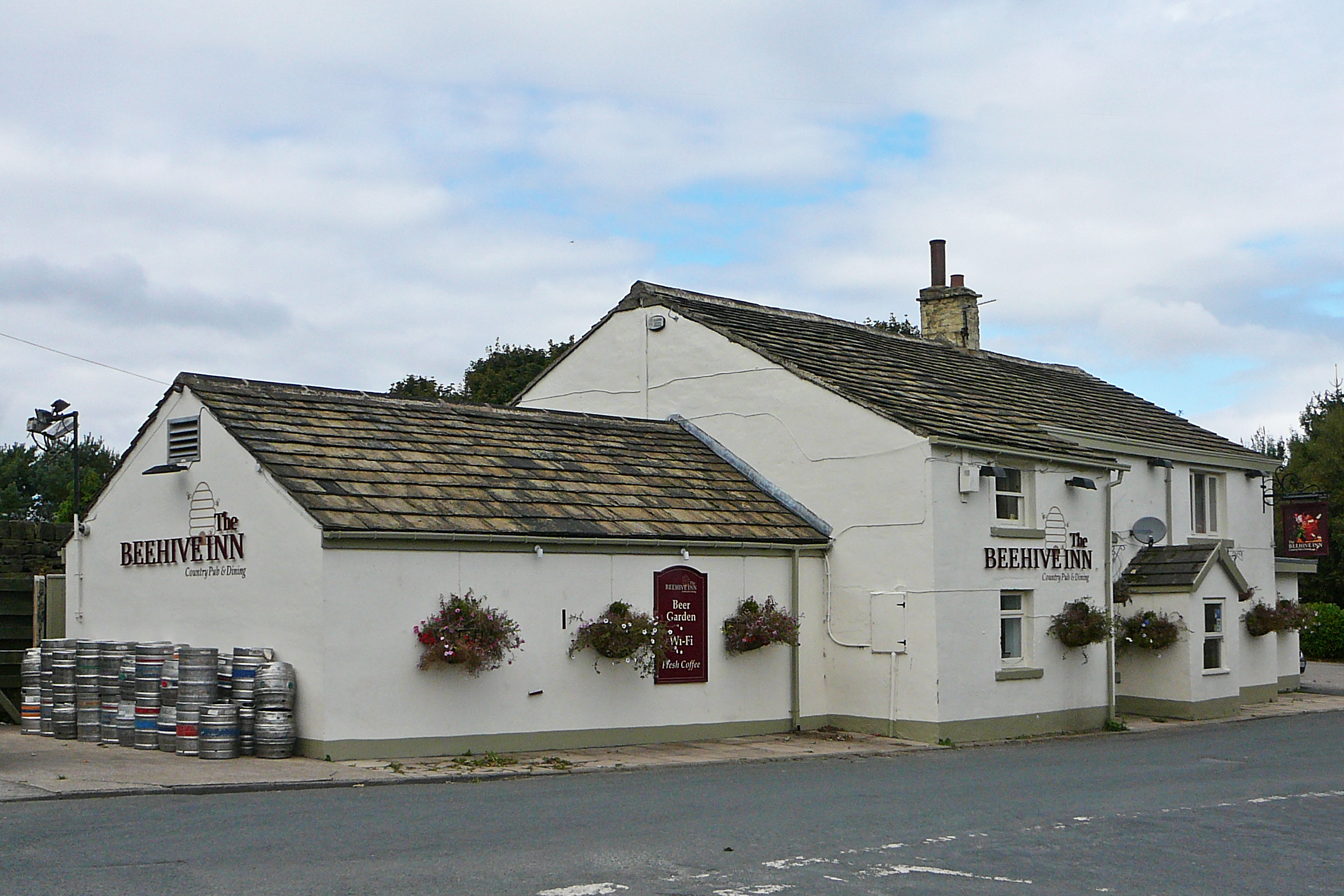
The Beehive Inn

Ripponden and its villages were formerly served by the Rishworth branch line from Sowerby Bridge; Ripponden and Barkisland railway station closed to passengers in 1929 and the line was closed completely in 1958.

Ripponden is the terminus of the annual Sowerby Bridge Rushbearing Festival.

The village is on the route of the Calderdale Way, a 50-mile (80-kilometre) circular walk around the hills and valleys of Calderdale.

Ripponden Junior and Infant School has a capacity of 240 children ages 4–11.

The Methodist Church in Ripponden is called Stones Methodist Church. The church was built in 1902, replacing the an chapel which had fallen into disrepair.

The Old Bridge Inn in the village is the home of an annual pork pie competition. The Old Bridge Inn is a Grade II listed building and is one of the oldest pubs in Yorkshire; its construction is dated to 1307. The Old Bridge, or Waterloo Bridge, near the Inn is on the old packhorse road through the village and is also known as the Packhorse Bridge.

On 6 July 2014, Stage 2 of the 2014 Tour de France, from York to Sheffield, passed through the village. On leaving Ripponden at the 112.5-kilometre (69 7/8 mi) point, riders undertook the third climb of the stage, the Category 3 Côte de Ripponden. It was 1.3 km (3/4 mi) long with an average gradient of 8.6%. The first rider over the top to claim two points in the King of the Mountains competition was Cyril Lemoine of Cofidis. The other point available was claimed by David De La Cruz Melgarejo.

== Notable people ==
- James Walton, inventor and industrialist, born in Ripponden in 1803.
- Sir Norman Howard Bottomley, Air Chief Marshal of the RAF and Commander-in-Chief of RAF Bomber Command in 1945, was born in Ripponden in 1891.
- Nobel Prize–winning American physicist Prof Richard Feynman was a regular visitor to the village in the 1960s–1980s, with his third wife Gweneth Howarth, who was born locally. He also spent significant time in nearby Mill Bank.

== Sport ==
The village has a football team Ryburn United FC, they are a Charter Standard Community football club, and provide football for all ages, their grounds are on Ripponden Wood Playing Fields. Stones Cricket Club play near the village and are members of the Halifax Cricket League.

== See also ==
- Listed buildings in Ripponden
