= Stephen Rishworth =

English footballer

Personal information
- Full name: Stephen Peter Rishworth
- Date of birth: 8 June 1979 (age 47)
- Place of birth: Chester, England
- Position: Midfielder

Youth career
- 19??–1996: Manchester City
- 1996–1998: Wrexham

Senior career*
Years	Team	Apps	(Gls)
1998–2000	Wrexham	4	(0)
- * Club domestic league appearances and goals

Stephen Peter Rishworth (born 8 June 1980) is an English former footballer who played as a midfielder in the Football League for Wrexham.

== Career ==
Rishworth started as a trainee at Manchester City before moving to Wrexham's youth team in 1996. He made four appearances in the Football League Second Division at the start of the 1998–99 season, all as a substitute.

Rishworth then left professional football to study engineering at Balliol College, Oxford.
