= Sowerby Bridge railway station =

Railway station in West Yorkshire, England

Sowerby Bridge
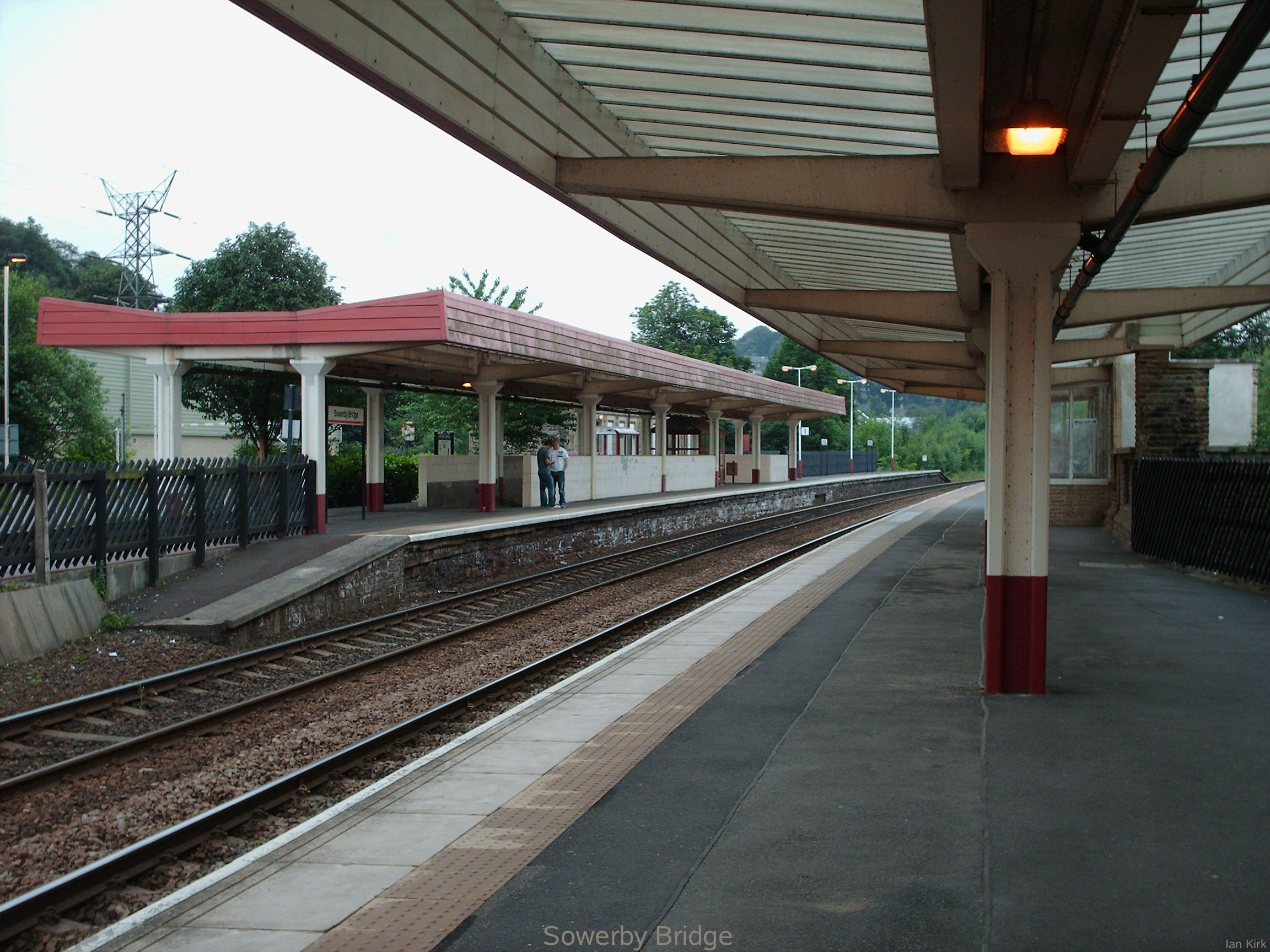
- Platform 2 at Sowerby Bridge railway station

General information
- Location: Sowerby Bridge, Calderdale; England
- Coordinates: 53.708°N 1.907°W
- Grid reference: SE062235
- Managed by: Northern
- Transit authority: West Yorkshire (Metro)
- Platforms: 2

Other information
- Station code: SOW
- Fare zone: 5
- Classification: DfT category F1

History
- Original company: Manchester and Leeds Railway
- Pre-grouping: Lancashire and Yorkshire Railway
- Post-grouping: London, Midland and Scottish Railway

Key dates
- 5 October 1840: First station opened
- 1 September 1876: Station re-sited
- 1981: Rebuilt

Passengers
- 2020/21: ▼91,060
- 2021/22: ▲0.274 million
- 2022/23: ▲0.339 million
- 2023/24: ▲0.373 million
- 2024/25: ▲0.417 million
Location
Notes
- Passenger statistics from the Office of Rail and Road

Sowerby Bridge railway station serves the town of Sowerby Bridge in West Yorkshire, England. It lies on the Caldervale Line 4.5 miles (7 km) west of Halifax and 21 miles (34 km) west of Leeds.

== History ==
The original station was opened on 5 October 1840 by the Manchester and Leeds Railway, on a site 662 yards (605 m) further west (on the other side of the River Ryburn) of the current site. Prior to opening, in August 1840, Branwell Brontë was engaged as 'assistant clerk in charge' at Sowerby Bridge, for which his salary was £75 per annum; he transferred to Luddendenfoot on 1 April 1841. The station became a junction from 1 January 1852, when a branch line from nearby Milner Royd Junction to Halifax was opened by the M&L's successor company the Lancashire and Yorkshire Railway; this allowed through trains to operate to Bradford Exchange and eventually Leeds via Stanningley from 1854. Ahead of the opening of the Rishworth branch in the 1880s, a new station was built on the current site - this opened on 1 September 1876.

Regular passenger services along the original M&L main line via Brighouse (to Wakefield Kirkgate and York) were withdrawn by British Rail on 5 January 1970. Through trains between Manchester & York over the route had ended in the mid-1960s (due to the Beeching Axe), leaving a much-reduced DMU service in later years that started/terminated here and connected with the Calder Valley trains via Bradford. The route remained in use for freight and was subsequently re-opened to passengers on a limited basis in 2000, with an all day service restored in 2007.

A major fire in 1978 resulted in the demolition of most of the buildings by British Rail in 1980. New canopies were erected in 1981 on the remaining platforms, with a ticket office housed in the surviving wing of the 1870s station, however this closed in 1983 and the station is now unstaffed. In 2008, the former ticket office building was re-opened as a bar called the Jubilee Refreshment Rooms.

A ticket machine was installed in 2011, allowing passengers to buy tickets before boarding for the first time in almost 30 years. Recent work has seen the installation of an electronic passenger information system (PIS), giving details of forthcoming departures, and the car park enlarged which is currently free to use. Step-free access is available to both platforms via the inclined subway linking them or from adjoining roads.

A volunteer group, The Friends of Sowerby Bridge Railway Station, was founded in 2010, to improve the station's environs.

== Accidents and incidents ==
- On 22 October 1903, an express passenger train was in collision with a light engine due to a signalman's error. Another passenger train collided with the wreckage at low speed. One person was killed.
- On 13 January 1963, a diesel train working from York to Liverpool caught fire as it entered the tunnel to the west of the station. The 70 passengers de-trained and walked back through the railway to the station. Although the last coach was on fire and the passengers evacuated past the blazing coach, there were no casualties.

== Services ==
The station now has a twice hourly basic service on weekdays and Saturdays. Eastbound trains run to Leeds via Bradford and via Dewsbury (hourly to each, plus a few peak extras). Westbound there are two trains per hour to Manchester Victoria, one of which continues to Wigan Wallgate and the other to Chester. Weekday service to Chester service via Warrington Bank Quay began at the May 2019 timetable change. The York to Blackpool North service that previously stopped here all week now only does so on Monday-Saturday evening peak services and Sundays, which has led to complaints from the local rail user group with regard to the reduction in service levels.

Sundays see an hourly service each way between York and Blackpool North trains (as noted above) and an hourly service between Leeds and Manchester Victoria (which now continues to Chester). All these service go via Halifax and Bradford Interchange, there are no services from Sowerby Bridge via Dewsbury on a Sunday.

== Route ==
At Milner Royd Junction, approximately a quarter of a mile to the east of the lines to Halifax and Brighouse diverge. Immediately east of the station, the dismantled branch line to Ripponden and Rishworth diverged to the southwest, until its closure in 1958. This had at one time its own separate wooden platform south of the main station and linked to it by a short footpath.

Preceding station	National Rail	Following station
Mytholmroyd	Northern; Caldervale Line	Halifax
Mytholmroyd	Northern; Caldervale Line	Brighouse
	Disused railways	
Luddendenfoot	L&YR; Manchester - Halifax	Copley
Luddendenfoot	L&YR; Manchester - Normanton	Greetland
Watson's Crossing Halt	L&YR; Rishworth branch	Terminus

== Gallery ==
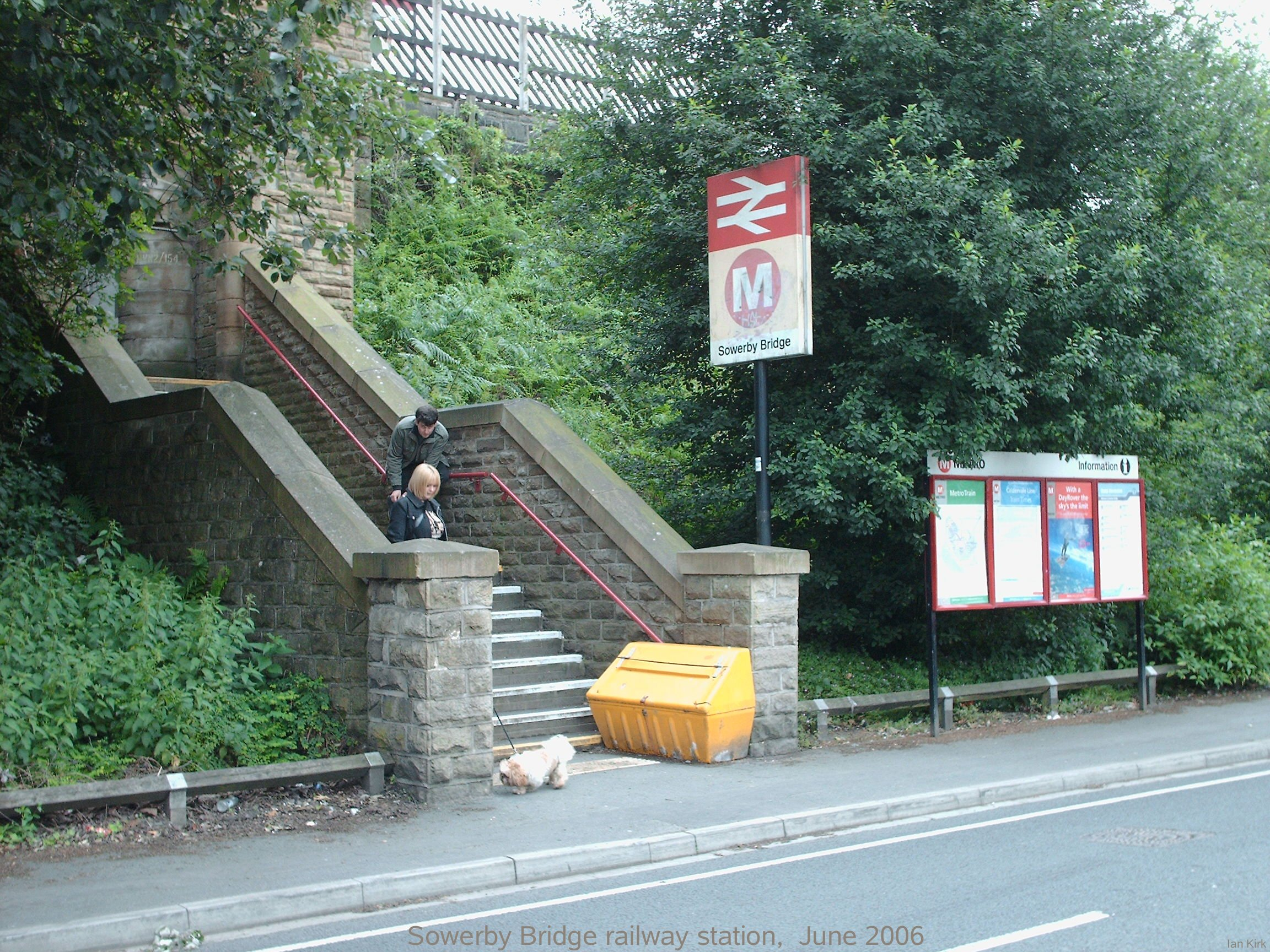
The station entrance

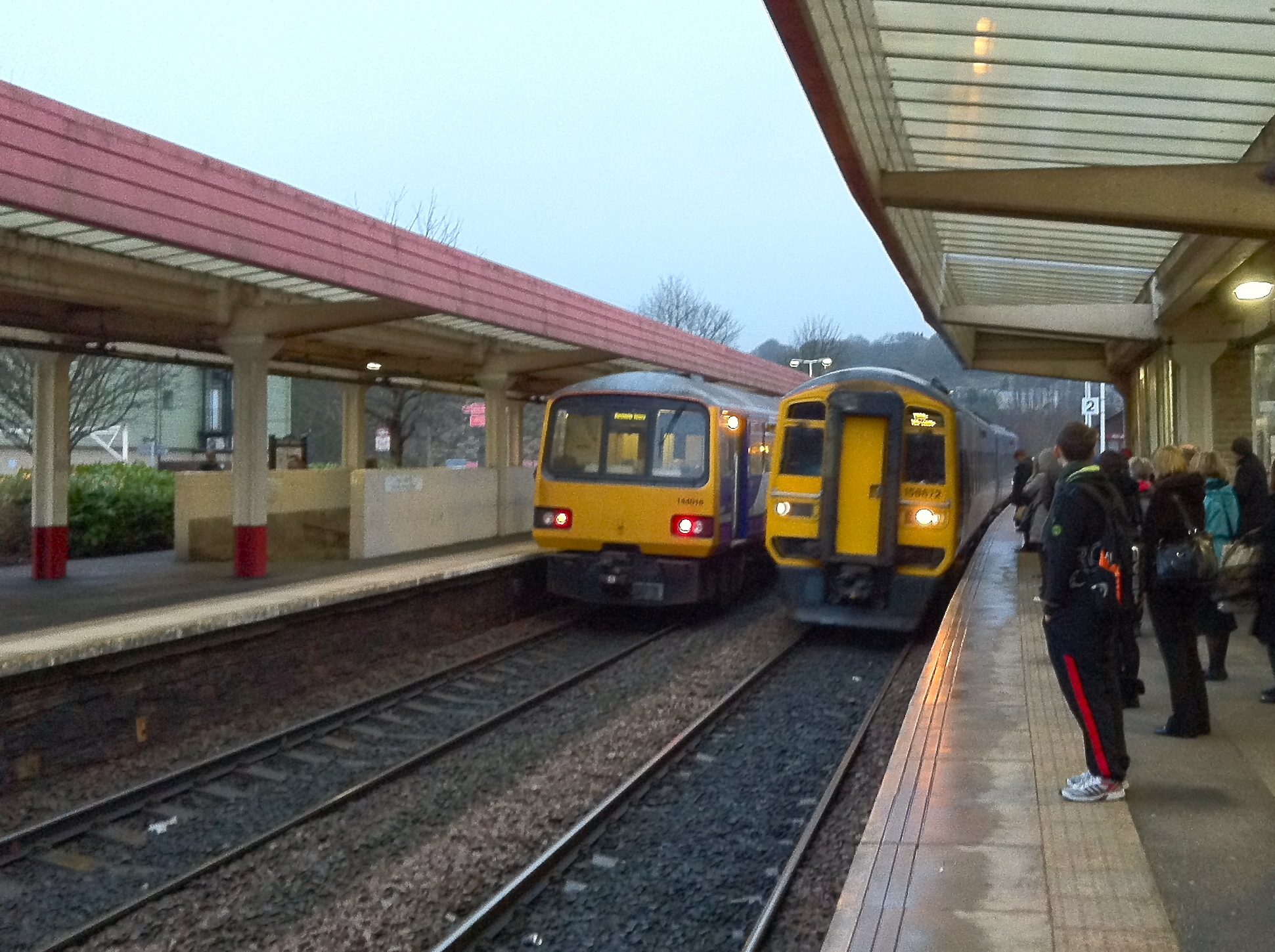
A Class 144 'pacer' (left) and a Class 158 'sprinter' (right) at the station in 2011.

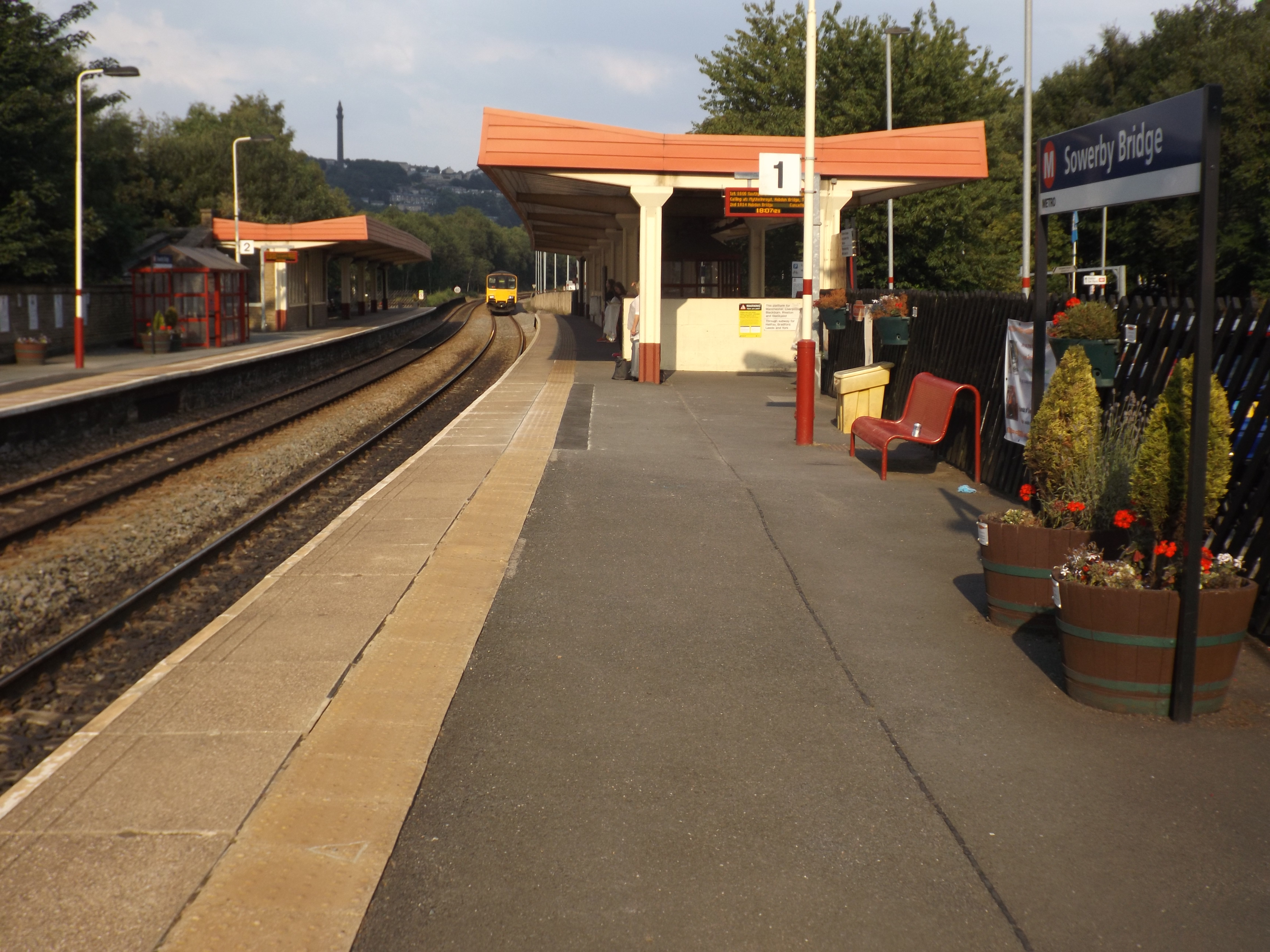
A Class 150 'sprinter' arriving at platform 1 in 2018

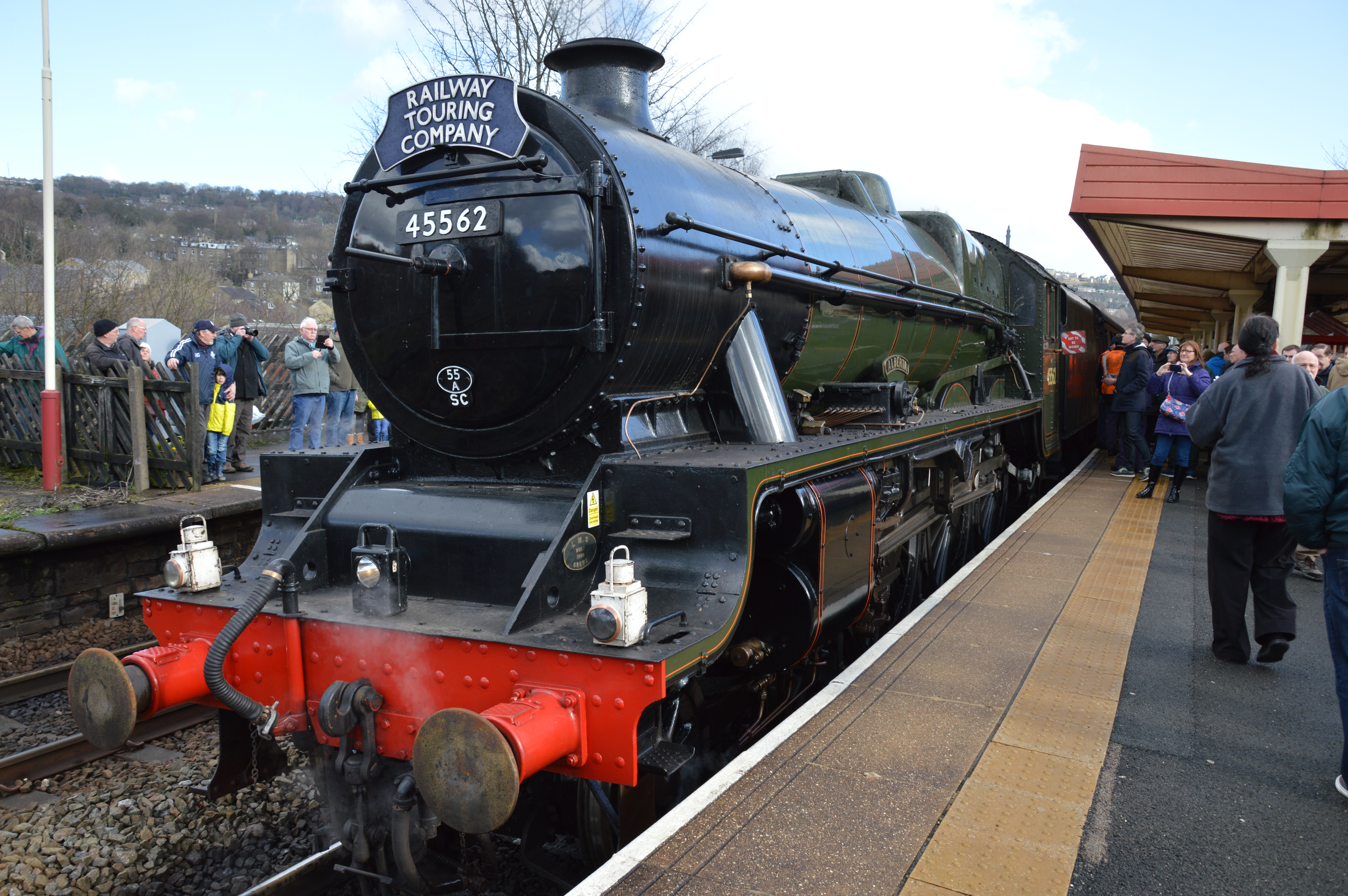
45562 Alberta taking on water in Sowerby Bridge while working "The Cotton Mill Express" from Lancaster to Blackburn on Sat 29th Feb 2020.
