= Rishworth railway station =

Disused railway station in West Yorkshire, England

Rishworth
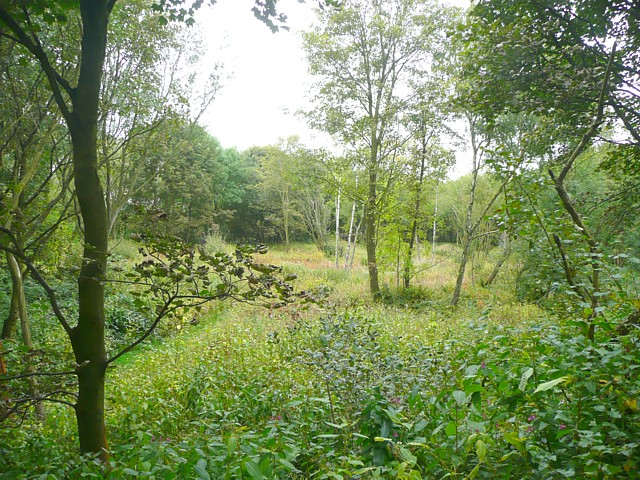
- Overgrown site of the former station in 2009

General information
- Location: Rishworth, Calderdale; England
- Coordinates: 53.6656°N 1.9451°W
- Grid reference: SE037187

Other information
- Status: Disused

History
- Original company: Lancashire and Yorkshire Railway
- Pre-grouping: Lancashire and Yorkshire Railway
- Post-grouping: London, Midland and Scottish Railway

Key dates
- 1 March 1881: Opened
- 8 July 1929: Closed to passengers
- February 1953: closed completely
Location

Rishworth railway station was a railway station on the Rishworth branch, built by the Lancashire & Yorkshire Railway, to serve the village of Rishworth in Calderdale, West Yorkshire, England. It opened in 1881 and closed to passenger services in 1929; goods traffic ceased in 1953.

While the station was open, services ran from and to Sowerby Bridge north of Rishworth. A planned extension of the line towards Rochdale was never built.

None of the buildings are still standing intact, however, some station remains can be seen on the overgrown site, as well as the platform.

Preceding station	Disused railways	Following station
Terminus	L&YR; Rishworth branch	Ripponden and Barkisland
