= Rishworth branch =

Disused railway line in West Yorkshire, England

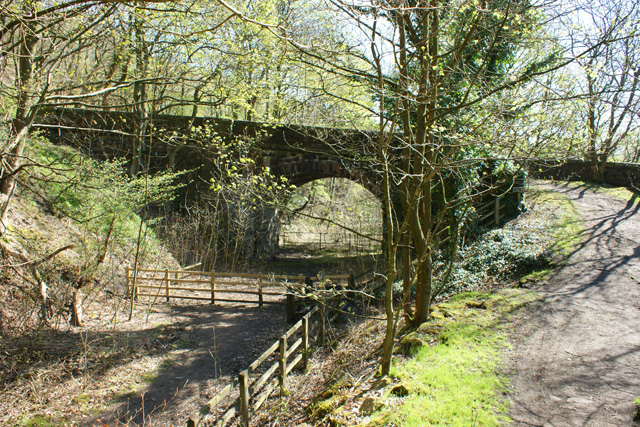

Overview
- Status: Disused
- Owner: Lancashire and Yorkshire Railway
- Locale: West Yorkshire, England
- Termini: Sowerby Bridge; Rishworth

History
- Opened: 1 July 1878 (goods)
- Closed: 8 July 1929 (passenger); 1 September 1958 (goods)

Technical
- Track gauge: 4 ft 8 1/2 in (1,435 mm) standard gauge
Route map
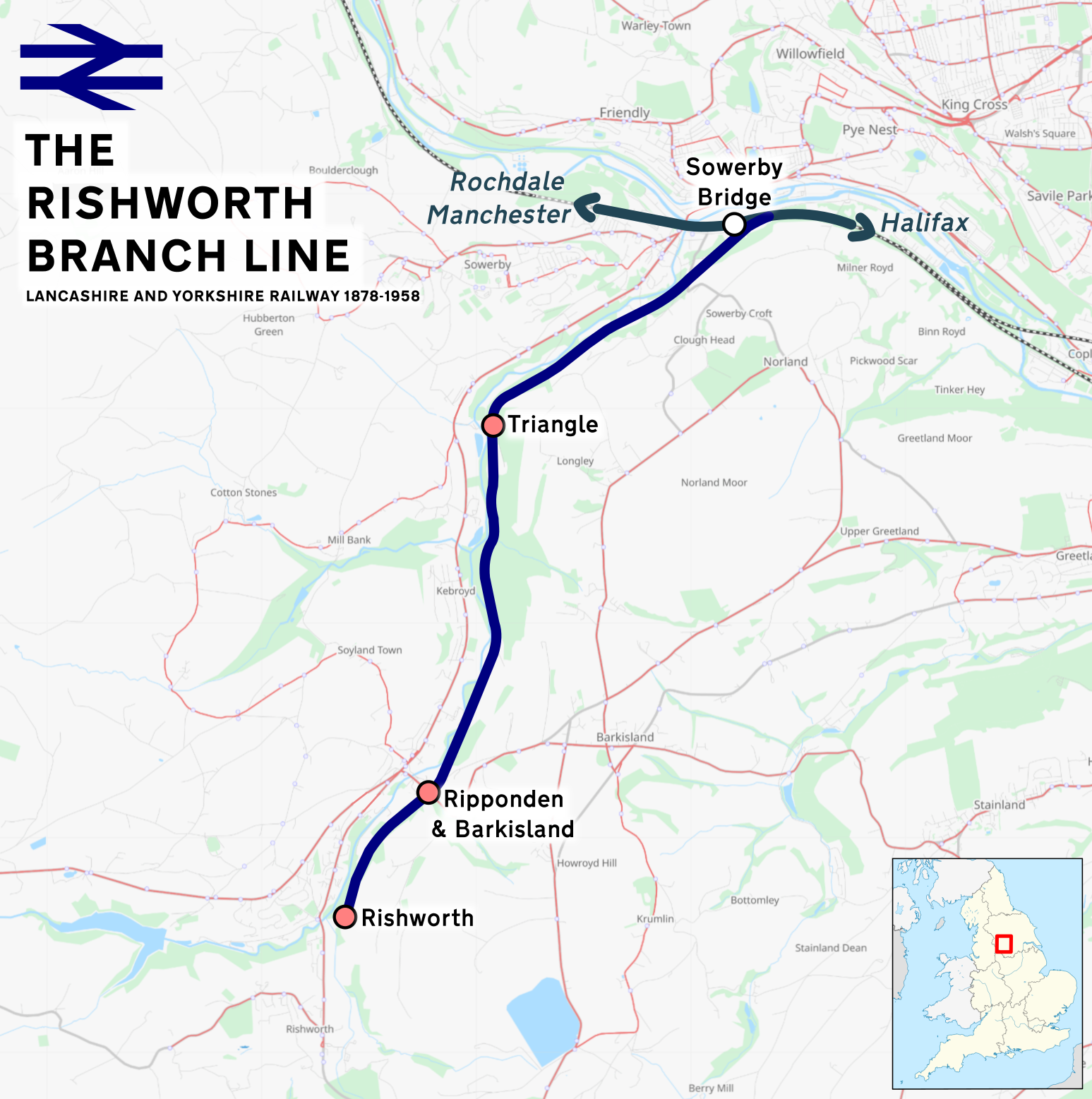
(Click to expand)

The Rishworth branch was built in the Ryburn valley by the Lancashire and Yorkshire Railway and linked Sowerby Bridge with Rishworth and served the villages of Triangle, Ripponden, Barkisland and Rishworth.

== History ==
Lancashire and Yorkshire Railway (Ripponden and Stainland Branches, &c.) Act 1865
- Act of Parliament
- Parliament of the United Kingdom
- Long title: An Act for conferring Powers on the Lancashire and Yorkshire Railway Company for the Construction of Branch Railways and Works and the Acquisition of Lands; and for other Purposes.
- Citation: 28 & 29 Vict. c. cccxxxii

Dates
- Royal assent: 5 July 1865

Lancashire and Yorkshire Railway (Ripponden Branch Extension, &c.) Act 1870
- Act of Parliament
- Parliament of the United Kingdom
- Long title: An Act for conferring powers on the Lancashire and Yorkshire Railway Company for the construction of a railway and other works, and the acquisition of lands, in the west riding of the county of York and the county of Lancaster; and for other purposes.
- Citation: 33 & 34 Vict. c. lxxx

Dates
- Royal assent: 20 June 1870

Text of statute as originally enacted

A branch from Sowerby Bridge to Ripponden was authorised by the Lancashire and Yorkshire Railway (Ripponden and Stainland Branches, &c.) Act 1865 (28 & 29 Vict. c. cccxxxii), with the extension to Rishworth authorised by the Lancashire and Yorkshire Railway (Ripponden Branch Extension, &c.) Act 1870 (33 & 34 Vict. c. lxxx). The line opened as far as Ripponden in 1878 and to Rishworth in 1881. The section to Ripponden was built by T. J. Walker at a cost of £113,000.

The railway herein-before referred to and authorised by this Act is—

A railway one mile seven furlongs and four chains, or thereabouts, in length, to be called the "Ripponden Branch Extension," commencing by a junction with the authorised line of the Ripponden Branch Railway in the township of Barkisland in the parish of Halifax in the west riding of the county of York, west of and near the farmhouse called Little Even, and terminating in the township of Rishworth in the same parish south of and near Slitheroe House. — Section 5, Lancashire and Yorkshire Railway (Ripponden Branch Extension, &c.) Act 1870 (33 & 34 Vict. c. lxxx)

It was intended to extend the line to Littleborough to shorten the Calder Valley main line by 5 miles (8 km), but this was ruled out quite soon after the branch opened and never taken up again. The branch line was in competition for passengers firstly with a tram line that ran up the valley, and secondly after a private firm had started running buses between Rishworth and Halifax; this took away the remaining few passengers who used the service and the line was closed to passengers to Rishworth on 8 July 1929. In an effort to save costs, the Lancashire & Yorkshire Railway tried using railmotors on the branch, but the trains were unpopular with the crews who maintained that they were difficult to keep in steam, and the railmotors were withdrawn from the Sowerby Bridge area when the passenger service ceased along the branch. Special excursion trains did continue using the branch after July 1929, but these ceased at the outbreak of the Second World War in 1939. The section between Rishworth and Ripponden closed for freight in 1953 and Ripponden to Sowerby Bridge closed completely on 1 September 1958.

== Route ==
The line left Sowerby Bridge a little to the east of the station, diverging south. It passed through the 593 yd (542 m) Scar Head tunnel, rising on a 1 in 107 gradient to Triangle which was on a level section. From Triangle to Rishworth the gradient increased to 1 in 60. The entire line from Sowerby Bridge to Rishworth was 3.75 miles (6.04 km) long.

== Present day ==
A section of the line south west from Ripponden village is a permissive footpath.
