= Stainland branch =

Disused railway line in West Yorkshire, England

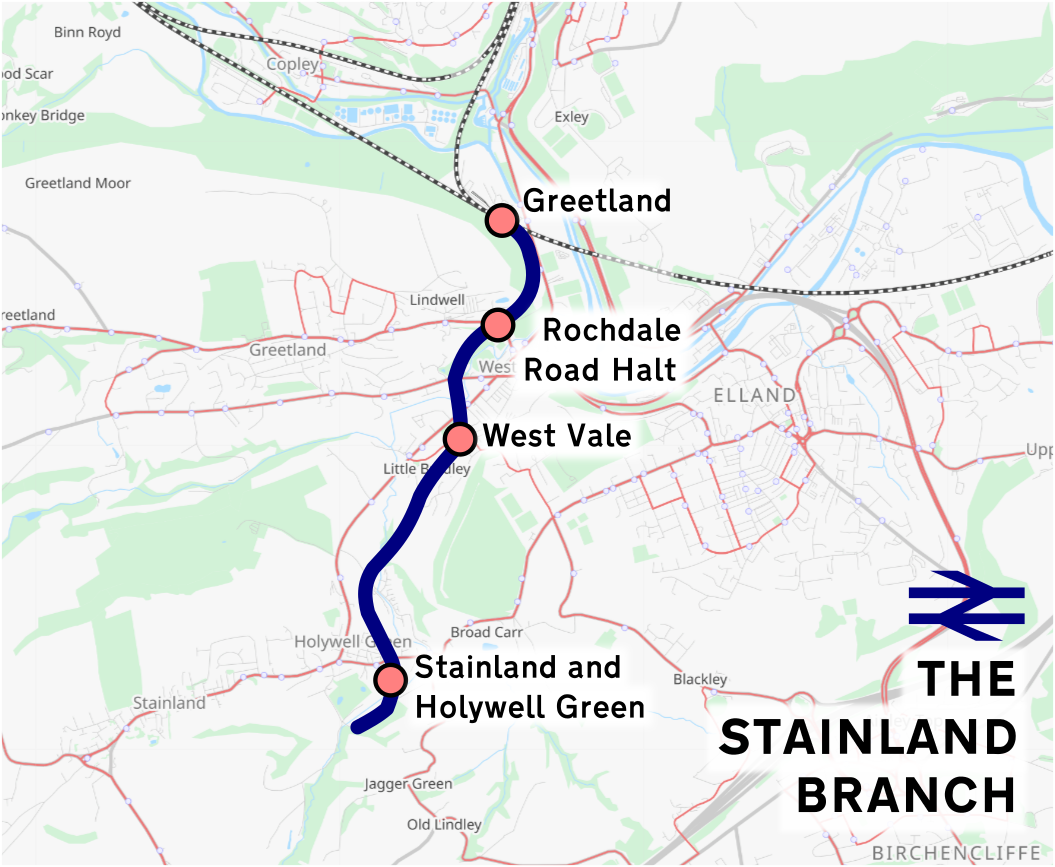
Route map (Click to expand)

The Stainland branch was built by the Lancashire and Yorkshire Railway and linked Greetland with Stainland and Holywell Green. It served the villages of Greetland, West Vale, Holywell Green and Stainland.

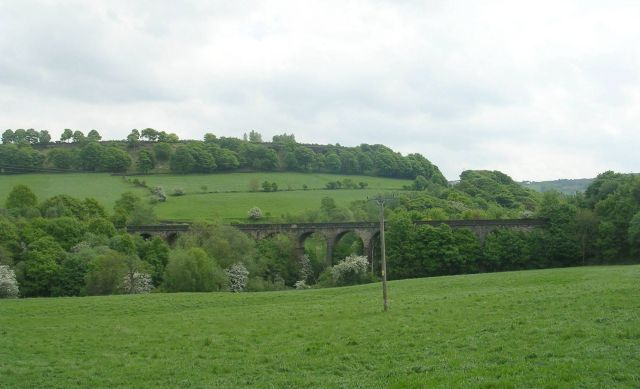
Viaduct of the line across Stainland Road

== History ==
=== Traffic ===
This branch was built to serve the local textile works with coal and woollen yarn going up the valley to the mills in Holywell Green and Stainland, with stone and cloth coming down to Greetland. Six passenger trains a day were provided between Stainland and Halifax when it opened in 1875 and these were converted to railmotor operation in 1907.

For the first three decades, passenger traffic fluctuated according to local demand, with 6 trains operating each way between Stainland and Greetland, with passengers changing at the latter. By 1905, 13 trains ran each weekday, plus a through train in each direction between Stainland and Bradford. The 1st of March 1907 saw the introduction of Hughes steam railmotors between Stainland and Halifax, via Greetland and Dryclough jct. These railmotors acquired the nickname of “The Stainland Donkey”, and continued to work the line until the cessation of passenger services on 23 September 1929.

Occasionally, the railmotors were supplemented by radial tank engines and compartment coaches, which usually ran on the Saturday evening 21:35 service from Halifax. The radial tank and it’s three coaches would depart Halifax at roughly 21:30, for West Vale and Stainland only; with the rail motor following in close succession at 21:35, calling at Greetland, Rochdale Road halt, West Vale, and Stainland.

Railmotors would carry around 60 passengers, however, on the 12:44 service for Halifax each Saturday, a trailer would be attached, increasing the seating capacity to 130.

==== Special services ====
From 1885, an annual music festival was held in Stainland, which drew in large numbers of visitors from neighbouring villages. To accommodate for these increased numbers, two or three special services ran from Halifax to Stainland, each hauled by a radial tank.

In the 1920s, a through train ran from Stainland to Blackpool and back, each Saturday of the holiday season.

==== Goods traffic ====
Goods traffic was worked by a pilot engine from Greetland, to Brookroyd mills, located a few hundred yards along from Stainland Station. In the early days of the branch, the freight was worked by 0-6-0 STs, the maximum load from Greetland to West vale being 17 wagons and a brake. Freight trains were usually made up of coal wagons, vans, and sheeted open wagons. The vans were used for textile and paper traffic. Coal was carried in open wagons, with side and bottom doors for the drops at Greetland.

The first train of the day left Greetland sidings at 08:00, with a full load returning by during the afternoon. The second train left Greetland between 11:00 and 12:00, and cleared out all of the empty coal wagons. The third train left Greetland at approximately 15:30, returning at 17:00, clearing out all merchandise loaded during the day. This train ran much earlier on Saturdays, as the goods yard closed at 13:00.

=== Closure ===
At the grouping, the service had increased to 16 each way but competition from trams led to the London, Midland and Scottish Railway (LMS) withdrawing the service in September 1929. Goods services continued to run until September 1959, when the line was permanently closed. At some point between the termination of passenger services in 1929, and the 1950s; the line was converted to single track.

In 1962, rails and sleepers were removed from the trackbed.

Stretches of the line have been overbuilt since. The viaducts in West Vale and Holywell Green still stand. On West vale viaduct, a roadway has been paved for inclusion in a regional hiking path.

== Route ==
The branch was a double track arrangement which curved southwards immediately after leaving Greetland station, passing through the outskirts of North Dean Woods. A siding was located here, serving a small coal yard, complete with coal drops. Climbing a gradient of 1 in 50, the line continued through a cutting before bridging Rochdale Road. In 1907, a halt was opened at this location, which served until the termination of passenger services in 1929. The line then continued through another cutting, before reaching West Vale viaduct. Almost immediately after the viaduct was a level crossing at the entrance to West Vale Station and goods yard. After West vale station, the line continued onwards, still climbing at 1 in 50, passing under a small bridge carrying Long Heys Road, until it reached Rawroyds viaduct, where the gradient eased to 1 in 344. After leaving the viaduct, the line curved left, passing through a cutting excavated from solid rock, on the approach to Stainland station and goods yard. which was located immediately after the bridge carrying Station Road. The line then continued for a few hundred yards until it reached Brookroyd Mills.

=== Goods yards ===
The line featured two goods yards, located at West Vale Station, and Stainland Station. Typically, the yards would be operational until 18:00 each weekday, with workers waiting until 17:30 latest to receive loads. On Saturdays, the yards would shut at an earlier time of 13:00.

==== West Vale goods yard ====
The goods yard was located Immediately after West Vale station, and featured 5 long sidings, one of which passed through a goods shed to a loading platform. One head shunt was provided for working the goods yard, and another was located at the south end.

==== Stainland goods yard ====
The goods yard was located opposite Stainland station, and consisted of five sidings and a loop which connected with the down line. There was a goods shed, similar to that at West Vale, and also a long loading platform by the siding furtherest from the main line. At the south end of this platform was a wagon weighbridge and office, as well as a small complex of cattle pens. A small stable to accommodate four horses and a harness room were situated near to the road entrance to the yard.

=== Stations ===
Despite its short length of approximately 1.6 miles (2.6 km), the branch had three stations, Greetland, Rochdale Road Halt (which operated from 1907 until 1929), West Vale, and Stainland & Holywell Green. All station buildings were demolished in 1937.
