= Maury Kaye =

Canadian musician (1932–1983)

- Born: Morris David Kronick; March 29, 1932; Montreal, Quebec, Canada
- Died: February 2, 1983 (aged 50) Montreal, Quebec, Canada
- Genres: Bebop, jazz
- Occupation: Composer
- Instruments: Piano; valve trombone; trumpet; French horn
- Years active: 1949–1983
- Label: Trans-World

Maury (Morris David) Kaye (b. Kronick) (March 29, 1932 – February 2, 1983) was a Canadian jazz pianist and composer.

== Life ==
Born in Montreal, Quebec, he studied piano 1945–49 at the Conservatoire de musique du Québec, where Arthur Letondal was his teacher. In 1952, at the age of 20, Kaye was the bandleader at the El Morocco, a position he held until 1959. During those years Kaye also performed with his own groups and was a dominant participant on the Montreal jazz scene, as a pianist and also as a valve trombonist or trumpeter in the bands of Steve Garrick, Gilbert "Buck" Lacombe, and others. In his later years, Kaye was active both in Montreal and Toronto. He also toured Europe twice during the 1960s.

In Toronto, Kaye appeared in 1960–61 at the House of Hambourg in the Jack Gelber play The Connection. During that period he worked with Ron Collier, and also played in various studio orchestras at the O'Keefe Centre. A fiery bebop pianist, Kaye recorded with trumpeter Ted Curson (1962, Trans-World TWJ-7000). He also made CBC broadcast recordings as trumpeter with Lacombe and as a pianist and French hornist with Collier. At the famous Toronto jazz club Bourbon Street he performed with a plethora of jazz headliners during the late 1960s. Kaye was also highly in demand by the great vocalists of the day; he performed as accompanist with the likes of Tony Bennett, Pearl Bailey, Edith Piaf, Sammy Davis Jr., Josephine Baker, and Mel Tormé.

In his final years Kaye settled in Montreal. In the late 1970s he worked frequently in a trio format with bassist Jean Cyr and various drummers, occasionally adding trumpeter Charles Ellison, or vocalist Barbara Reney to complete a quartet. Kaye influenced many of the jazz performers of his day, and also left a legacy of unrecorded compositions which are today held in the Concordia University Archives.
