= Elland railway station =

Disused railway station in West Yorkshire, England

Elland
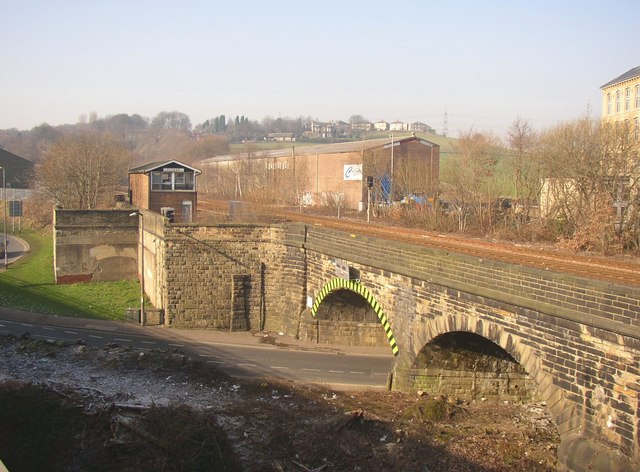
- Elland signal box, at the east end of the former location of Elland railway station.

General information
- Location: Elland, Calderdale; England
- Coordinates: 53.690228°N 1.831626°W (new location)
- Grid reference: SE105216 (old location); SE112215 (proposed location)
- Platforms: 2

Other information
- Status: Disused

History
- Original company: Manchester and Leeds Railway
- Pre-grouping: Lancashire and Yorkshire Railway; London and North Western Railway
- Post-grouping: London, Midland and Scottish Railway

Key dates
- 5 October 1840: Opened
- 1 August 1865: Resited
- 28 June 1962: Goods facilities withdrawn
- 10 September 1962: Closed
- 14 March 2023: New station gains planning approval
- 10 December 2025: Early clearance work takes place
- 9 February 2026: Construction legally begins
- 2029: Services to commence
Location

Elland railway station served the town of Elland in West Yorkshire, England until 1962. Since 1995, Calderdale Council has announced a series of plans to open it.

== History ==
The station was originally opened on 5 October 1840 by the Manchester and Leeds Railway. It was resited 607 ft (185 m) east on 1 August 1865, by which time the line had become part of the Lancashire and Yorkshire Railway which had taken over the Manchester and Leeds on 9 July 1847. Upon the grouping in 1923, it became part of the London, Midland and Scottish Railway.

Elland station closed to passengers on 10 September 1962. Goods facilities were withdrawn on 28 June 1962.

Preceding station	Historical railways	Following station
Greetland; Line open, station closed	Lancashire and Yorkshire Railway; Manchester and Leeds Railway	Brighouse; Line and station open

== Proposed reopening ==
Plans to reopen the station in 2000 (at the same time as Brighouse railway station) were cancelled due to lack of funds.

In 2006, Clayton Homes offered to build a station in return for planning permission for residential development. This did not materialise but Calderdale Council continued consulting on possible plans.

Reopening of the station is supported by the Halifax & District Rail Action Group and local campaign group "Give Elland a Rail Station". The New Stations Study undertaken for West Yorkshire Metro in 2014 found that Elland provided the strongest business case of a potential thirteen sites on the Calder Valley line, and was recommended for further study along with stations at Haxby, East Leeds/Thorpe Park, and Cross Hills, with a projected cost of reopening of £6 million.

In June 2017, the West Yorkshire Combined Authority (WYCA) allocated £20 million towards re-opening the station, with planned opening date in 2022. In November 2017, the government announced Elland was one of four new stations proposed in the Government's ‘Connecting People: Strategic Vision for Rail’. In 2021, a planning application was submitted for two platforms, lifts, and a 116 space car park.

In March 2023, Calderdale council approved its planning application for the new station, and construction was expected to begin in 2024, with an opening date in December 2025.

In November 2024, WYCA announced that the completion date for this scheme had been delayed until late 2026 "...because of a variety of factors, including design changes and supply chain challenges." On 9 September 2024, Calderdale Council announced that WYCA had appointed a contractor, Keltbray Infrastructure Services Limited, for the final stage of development work.

In May 2025, Calderdale Council said that the station would reopen in late 2026, and would be able to accommodate the six-car trains required by the WYCA on the Calder Valley route.

In January 2026, Calderdale Council approved compulsory purchase powers as part of a plan for a new multi-million pound station. An access package for which compulsory purchase powers relate to had been approved by the Secretary of State to be used to ensure that the station is not built in isolation with improvements to be made to pedestrian and cycle routes to the station from the town centre and Lowfields Business Park. Money for both the station itself and for the access package are to be fully considered at West Yorkshire Combined Authority’s meeting on 28 January 2026.

In late January, a certificate of lawful development was applied for which was then granted on 9 February. This meant that construction work can officially and legally begin on the station and has done so. This is nearly three years after planning permission was granted. Earlier clearance work had commenced in preparation for the station car park on 10 December 2025. This was located adjacent to Old Power Way. In July 2026, preparatory work was started on access to the station including new bridges, though the station itself, is not expected to open until 2029.

Preceding station	Future services	Following station
Halifax	Northern Caldervale Line	Brighouse
Sowerby Bridge	Northern Caldervale Line	Brighouse
