= West Vale railway station =

Disused railway station in West Yorkshire, England

West Vale

General information
- Location: West Vale, Calderdale; England
- Coordinates: 53.6835°N 1.8593°W
- Grid reference: SE092208
- Platforms: 2

Other information
- Status: Disused

History
- Original company: Lancashire and Yorkshire Railway
- Pre-grouping: Lancashire and Yorkshire Railway
- Post-grouping: London, Midland and Scottish Railway

Key dates
- 1 January 1875: Opened
- 23 September 1929: Closed to passengers
- 14 September 1959: Closed to goods services
Location

West Vale railway station served on the Stainland Branch from 1875 to 1929.

== History ==
The station was opened on New years day 1875, along with the rest of the branch. For such a small branch, the station was well developed. The main station buildings were located on the up platform, and contained the booking office, with ticket windows for first, second, and third class, opening into a large general waiting room. In addition, there were also separate ladies and gentleman's waiting rooms on either side of the booking office, plus other general facilities. On the down platform was a grand building, with a general waiting room and first class rooms for ladies and gentlemen either side

The buildings and platform have been demolished and the land developed, but were located a little south west of where Green Lane meets Green Royd. A footpath still follows the track bed south from Green Royd. Sustrans and Calderdale Council are in the process of reopening the trackbed north over the grade II listed viaduct as part of the national cycle network.

== Route ==
| Preceding station | Disused railways | Following station |
|---|---|---|
| Rochdale Road | L&YR; Stainland Branch | Stainland and Holywell Green |
