= Alfred Page =

Alfred Page may refer to:

- Alfred Page (Australian politician) (1843–1911), member of the Tasmanian Legislative Council
- Alfred R. Page (1859–1931), American lawyer and politician from New York
- Alfred Page (priest) (1912–1988), Archdeacon of Leeds
