= St Michael and All Angels Church, Shelf, West Yorkshire =

St. Michael and All Angels Church
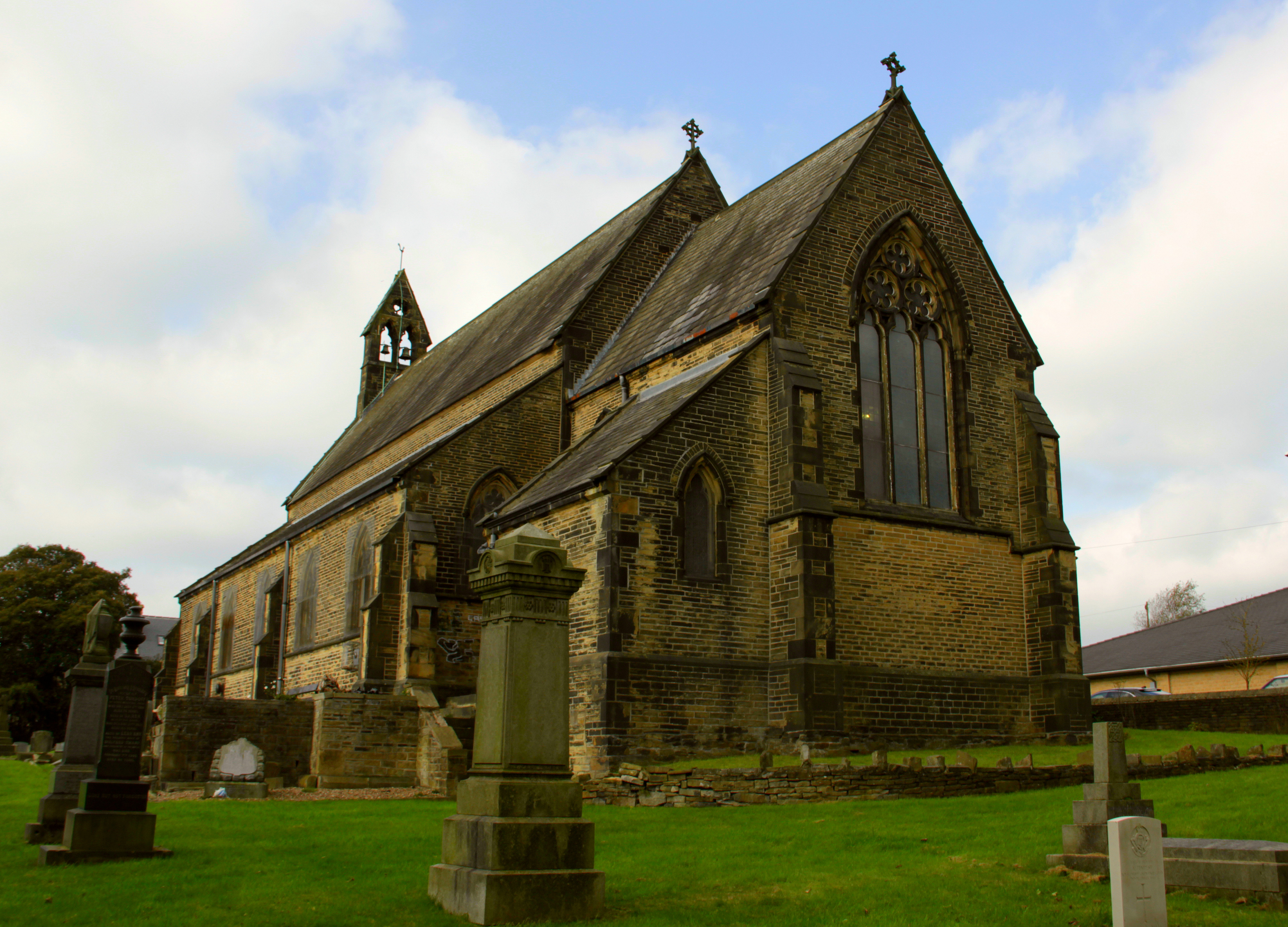
- St. Michael and All Angels Church
- 53°45′16.9″N 1°48′27.6″W
- OS grid reference: SE 13060 29000
- Country: England
- Denomination: Church of England
- Churchmanship: Broad Church

History
- Dedication: St. Michael

Administration
- Province: York
- Diocese: Leeds
- Archdeaconry: Bradford
- Deanery: Bradford
- Parish: Shelf

St. Michael and All Angels Church in Shelf, West Yorkshire, England, is dedicated to Saint Michael.

== History ==
The church was endowed by John Hardy, a majority share holder in the Low Moor Ironworks, and was consecrated on 14 June 1850.

Lucius Smith the first Bishop of Knaresborough was born at the Vicarage at Shelf in 1860 and his father was the Vicar and Kathleen Hale, author of the series of children's books about Orlando the Marmalade Cat also lived at the vicarage with her grandfather from 1903 to 1905, and developed her interest in plants, flowers and drawing there.

The church was extended in 1984. On 1 April 1994 the Parish of St Michael and All Angels, Shelf, joined with the parish of St Aidan, Buttershaw. The two churches are both designated as parish churches in Shelf with Buttershaw Parish. Services are held on Sundays and during the week.

== Church Building ==
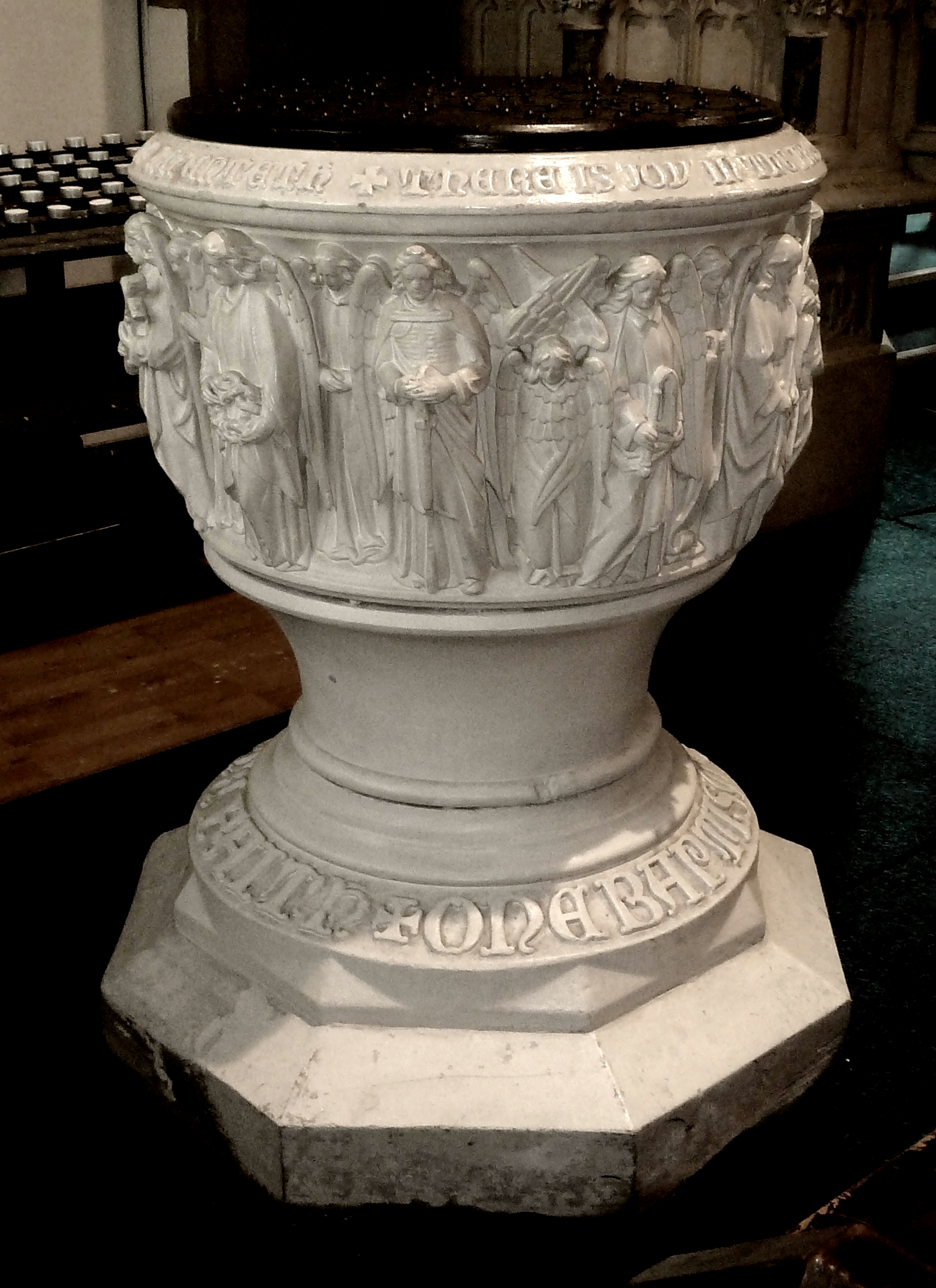
Font with crowd of carved angels at St Michael's

The church building was designed by James Mallinson and Thomas Healey. The church has a north porch and a turret containing two bells. An organ was first installed in 1858 and an organ chamber installed in 1880.

The church is decorated with sculptures by Robert Mawer. These include a number of carved heads on the dripstones of the windows and outer archway, carved angels on corbels supporting the roof trusses, and floriated capitals which support the chancel arch. The font is carved with various angels with inscriptions around the top and base.
