= Rochdale Road Halt railway station =

Disused railway station in West Yorkshire, England

Rochdale Road Halt

General information
- Location: Greetland, Calderdale; England
- Coordinates: 53.6889°N 1.8557°W

Other information
- Status: Disused

History
- Original company: Lancashire & Yorkshire Railway
- Post-grouping: London, Midland and Scottish Railway

Key dates
- 1 March 1907: Opened
- 23 September 1929: Closed to passengers
Location

Rochdale Road Halt served the village of Greetland, West Yorkshire, England, on the Stainland Branch from 1907 to 1929.

== Location ==
The halt was located where the Stainland Branch crosses Rochdale Road (B6113) on an overbridge. The bridge and station have now been demolished and little remains to show a railway crossed the road here.

== Route ==
Preceding station	Disused railways	Following station
Greetland	L&YR; Stainland Branch	West Vale
