= Bungay High School =

School in Suffolk, England

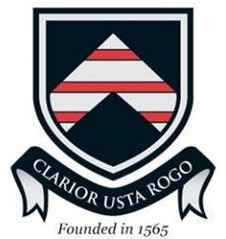

Location
- Queen's Road; Bungay, Suffolk, NR35 1RW; England
- Coordinates: 52.44541°N 1.44327°E

Information
- Type: Comprehensive; Academy
- Motto: Clarior Usta Rogo (I beseech thee to burn more brightly)
- Established: 1565; 461 years ago
- Founder: Lionel Throckmorton
- Local authority: Suffolk
- Trust: East Anglian Schools Trust
- Department for Education URN: 136998 Tables
- Ofsted: Reports
- Head teacher: Chanel Oswick
- Gender: Co-educational
- Age: 11 to 18
- Specialist: Science
- Website: http://www.bungayhigh.co.uk

Bungay High School is a mixed-sex secondary school with academy status in the town of Bungay in the north of the English county of Suffolk. It caters for pupils aged 11 to 18. The school was founded by Lionel Throckmorton (or Throkmorton) as Bungay Grammar School in 1565 and became Bungay High School in 1974. It occupies a site on the Queen's Road site to the south of the town centre.

The school operates a sixth form on the site of the high school, offering a range of vocational and academic qualifications for post-16 students. The sixth form suspended admissions for September 2025 and currently only operates for year 13 pupils. The East Anglian schools trust states they are in the consultation process of closing the sixth form from September 2026, after low numbers of applications.

The school also operated North Suffolk Skills Academy in Halesworth, 9 miles (14 km) south of Bungay. This closed in August 2017 due to the lack of funding.

In 2021, the school was awarded an Ofsted inspection rating of "good".

== Notable alumni ==
=== Bungay Grammar School ===
- John Charles Winter (1923–2012), Organist and Master of the Choristers of Truro Cathedral, 1971–1988
- Leslie Boreham (1918–2004), barrister and judge, he presided over two high-profile court cases, of the Yorkshire Ripper Peter Sutcliffe (1981) and Brighton bomber Patrick Magee (1986).
- Alfred Page (1912–1988), clergyman and Archdeacon of Leeds from 1969 to 1981
