= Stainland and Holywell Green railway station =

Disused railway station in West Yorkshire, England

Stainland and Holywell Green
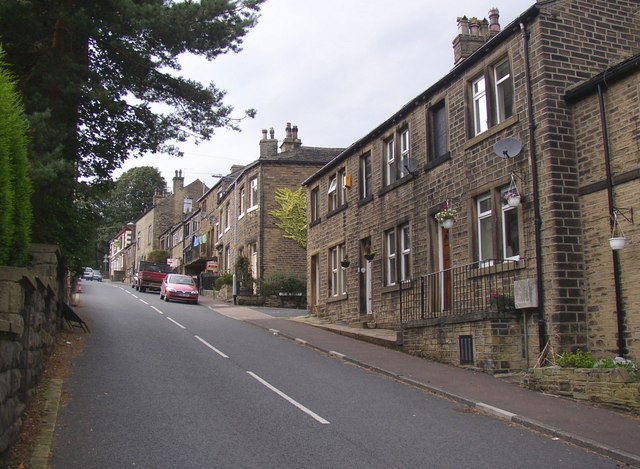
- Station Road, near the site of the station, in 2006

General information
- Location: Holywell Green, Calderdale; England
- Coordinates: 53.673299°N 1.864275°W
- Grid reference: SE090196
- Platforms: 1

Other information
- Status: Disused

History
- Pre-grouping: Lancashire & Yorkshire Railway
- Post-grouping: London, Midland and Scottish Railway

Key dates
- 1 January 1875: Opened
- 23 September 1929: Closed to passengers
- 14 September 1959: Closed to goods services
Location

Stainland and Holywell Green railway station served the villages of Stainland and Holywell Green in West Yorkshire, England from 1875 until 1929. Goods services ended in 1959. It was situated in the eastern part of Holywell Green.

== History ==
The station was opened to passengers on New Year's Day 1875, along with the rest of the line, and was the terminus of the line. The station consisted of a single platform and building to the west of the line, on a slight curve. The facilities of the station included a booking office and general waiting room, a telegraph and parcels office, a porters room, a lamp room, ladies and men's waiting rooms, and ladies and men's toilets. The station was accessed via a path that led down from Station road to the platform.

=== Goods yard ===
The goods yard was located opposite Stainland station, and consisted of five sidings and a loop which connected with the down line. There was a goods shed, similar to that at West Vale, and also a long loading platform by the siding furthest from the main line. At the south end of this platform was a wagon weighbridge and office, as well as a small complex of cattle pens. A small stable to accommodate four horses and a harness room was situated near to the road entrance to the yard.

=== Closure ===
The station was closed in 1929, after passenger services on the line were terminated. The station was demolished 8 years later, in 1937. The station site is now occupied by the Brookwoods Industrial estate, with the last section of the branch being used as an access road, passing under the bridge carrying Station Road.

| Preceding station | Disused railways | Following station |
|---|---|---|
| West Vale | L&YR; Stainland Branch | Terminus |
