= John Oliver (Archdeacon of Leeds) =

Archdeacon of Leeds (1939–2021)

John Michael Oliver (7 September 1939 - 23 January 2021) was an Anglican priest who was Archdeacon of Leeds from 1992 to 2005.

Oliver was educated at Ripon Grammar School and St David's College, Lampeter. He trained for ordination at Ripon Hall, Oxford and was ordained deacon in 1964 and priest in 1965. After curacies at St Peter's Church, Harrogate (1964–67) and Bramley (1967-72) he was Vicar of St Mary's Church, Harrogate (1972–78); then St Mary with St David, Beeston (1978–92). He was also Ecumenical Officer for Leeds Metropolitan Council of Churches from 1980 to 1986; Rural Dean of Armley from 1986 to 1992; and an Honorary Canon of Ripon Cathedral from 1987 to 1992. He was then collated as Archdeacon of Leeds in 1992.

He died in 2021, aged 81.
