= Listed buildings in Shelf, West Yorkshire =

Shelf is in the ward of Northowram and Shelf in the metropolitan borough of Calderdale, West Yorkshire, England. It contains 28 listed buildings that are recorded in the National Heritage List for England. Of these, one is listed at Grade I, the highest of the three grades, two are at Grade II*, the middle grade, and the others are at Grade II, the lowest grade. The ward contains the village of Shelf and the surrounding area. Most of the listed buildings are houses, cottages and associated structures, farmhouses, and farm buildings. The other listed buildings include a guide post, a public house, a church, two boundary stones, a milestone, a set of stocks, and the archway to a former brewery.

== Key ==
Grade	Criteria
I	Buildings of exceptional interest, sometimes considered to be internationally important
II*	Particularly important buildings of more than special interest
II	Buildings of national importance and special interest

== Buildings ==
Name and location	Photograph	Date	Notes	Grade
High Bentley; 53.75287°N 1.80243°W	—	c. 1500	A timber framed house encased in stone in 1661, and with a rear kitchen wing added in about 1665, it is in stone with quoins, and a stone slate roof with coped gables and kneelers. The house has a U-shaped plan to the south, consisting of a hall range and projecting wings, and a T-shaped plan to the north. The hall range has a single storey, and the wings have two. The main doorway has a decorative ogee lintel inscribed with a date and initials, and above it is a small lunette. Most of the windows are mullioned, and in the hall range is a twelve-light mullioned and transomed window.	I
Lower Field Bottom Farmhouse; 53.74285°N 1.81285°W	—	Mid-16th century	A timber framed house encased in stone in the 17th century, it has a stone slate roof with coped gables, kneelers and crocketed finials. It consists of a main range with two storeys and a rear aisle of one storey, and a two-storey gabled cross-wing. On the front are three bays, the left two bays gabled, and in the right bay is a doorway with a chamfered surround, composite jambs, and a square lintel. At the rear the doorways have monolithic jambs. The windows are mullioned or mullioned and transomed, with up to 14 lights.	II*
Low Bentley Farmhouse; 53.75158°N 1.80257°W		1600	The front of the house was rebuilt in about 1975. It is in stone with a string course and a stone slate roof with coped gables, kneelers and finials. There are two storeys, and the house consists of a hall range, a cross-wing, and a later rear kitchen wing, all gabled. The doorway has moulded composite jambs, and a dated lintel with a four-centred arch, and spandrels carved with initialled shields. The windows are mullioned or mullioned and transomed with hood moulds and up to 14 lights.	II
Carr House Farmhouse; 53.75647°N 1.80605°W	—	Early 17th century	The farmhouse, later divided, is in stone with quoins and a stone slate roof. There are two storeys and four bays, and a doorway with a chamfered surround and a square-headed lintel converted into a window. Most of the other windows are mullioned, with some mullions removed, and some lights blocked.	II
Dean House; 53.74668°N 1.80283°W	—	17th century	The house is in stone with quoins, and a stone slate roof with coped gables, kneelers, and a crocketed finial. There are two storeys, and it consists of a hall range and cross-wings, the hall range dating from the 18th century. The windows were originally mullioned or mullioned and transomed, some with hood moulds, but many mullions have been removed.	II
Cottage and barn, Hargreaves Head; 53.74312°N 1.82011°W	—	Mid-17th century	The barn is the older, the cottage was added in the 18th century, and they are in sandstone with a stone slate roof. The barn has a single aisle and four bays. The cottage has two storeys, and contains quoins and replacement casement windows.	II
High Bentley Farm; 53.75259°N 1.80125°W	—	Mid-17th century	A stone house that has a stone slate roof with coped gables, kneelers and finials. There are two storeys, and it consists of a hall range with cross-wings, and a later kitchen wing added between them. The main doorway has a chamfered surround, and a heavy Tudor arched lintel with spandrels. The windows are mullioned, some with hood moulds, and some mullions and transoms have been removed. At the rear are three gables, and two arched doorways, one in the upper floor, and the other in the ground floor.	II*
Barn, Lower Field Bottoms Farm; 53.74286°N 1.81310°W	—	Mid-17th century	The barn is in stone with a stone slate roof. It has an aisle on the west side, and a shorter aisle on the east. The barn contains a square-headed cart entry and arrow slit vents.	II
Plane Trees Farmhouse, Cottage and barn 53.74275°N 1.81505°W		Mid-17th century	The farmhouse, later divided into two, is in stone, partly rendered, and it has a stone slate roof. There are two storeys, and the house consists of a hall range with two gabled bays, a gabled cross-wing on the left, and a single-storey aisle at the rear. The doorway has monolithic jambs, and the windows are mullioned, or mullioned and transomed. Over the windows are hood moulds, continuous in the ground floor of the hall range.	II
Cock Hill; 53.75348°N 1.82638°W	—	Late 17th century	A row of cottages converted mainly from a house, they are in stone with quoins, stone slate roofs, and two storeys. The doorways have monolithic jambs, and most of the windows are mullioned, or mullioned and transomed, and some have been altered.	II
Whinney Royd Farmhouse; 53.75007°N 1.83137°W		Late 17th century (probable)	The farmhouse, which has been altered, is in stone with a hipped slate roof. There are two storeys and an irregular plan. In the south front is a large mullioned and transomed window, and the other windows are mullioned.	II
Jaque Royd and barn 53.74948°N 1.80184°W	—	1680	The house and barn are in stone with a stone slate roof. The house is partly rendered at the rear, and consists of a hall range and a cross-wing. The doorway has a chamfered surround and is arched with spandrels, and the windows are mullioned or mullioned and transomed. The barn is partly attached to the right side, and has an aisle and four bays.	II
Hargreaves Head; 53.74294°N 1.82034°W	—	1693	The house was largely rebuilt in about 1740 and altered in the 19th century. It is in stone with rusticated quoins, bands, a cornice, and a stone slate roof with coped gables. There are two storeys and seven bays, the second and fourth bays projecting under a pediment, a rear kitchen wing, and a later rear wing. The central doorway has an architrave and a pulvinated frieze, and most of the windows are sashes. In the kitchen wing is a four-light mullioned window.	II
Guide post and slab 53.74749°N 1.82379°W		Early 18th century	The guide post, also known as the Stone Chair, is by a road junction. It consists of two upright stone slabs set at an angle, joined by an iron strap, and in the angle is a triangular stone block. On the slabs are an inscription, and pointing hands indicating the directions to Halifax and Bradford, and to Brighouse and Denholme Gate. Attached to the wall behind the guide post is a stone slab dated 1737.	II
Mountain Cottages; 53.74614°N 1.82262°W	—	Early 18th century	A pair of stone cottages with quoins, and a stone slate roof with a coped gable and kneelers. The central doorways have plain surrounds and the windows are mullioned.	II
Windmill Hill; 53.74453°N 1.81815°W	—	Early 18th century	This consists of a two-storey house and a single-storey cottage at right angles. They are in stone, partly rendered, with quoins, a string course, and stone slate roofs with coped gables and kneelers. One doorway has composite jambs, and two have monolithic jambs. Most windows are mullioned, and there is an inserted casement window.	II
13 and 14 Coley Road; 53.74202°N 1.81543°W	—	1767	A pair of cottages in a row, they are in stone with a stone slate roof. There are two storeys, and each cottage has two bays. The doorways are in the right bays, and have monolithic jambs; No. 13 also has a porch. Above each doorway is a single-light window, and the other windows are mullioned with three lights. In the centre is an initialled and dated plaque.	II
7 and 9 Brow Lane; 53.75525°N 1.81162°W	—	1799	A pair of stone cottages with a stone slate roof. There are two storeys and each cottage has two bays. In the right bays are porches and doorways with monolithic jambs. Most of the windows are mullioned with three lights.	II
5 and 6 Riding Mill; 53.75408°N 1.80211°W	—	c. 1800	A pair of mirror-image cottages, they are in stone with sill bands and a stone slate roof. There are two storeys, and each cottage has two bays. The doorways are in the outer bays and have tie-stone jambs. The windows on the front are sashes, and at the rear are two-light mullioned windows.	II
11 Carr House Road; 53.75634°N 1.80958°W	—	Early 19th century	A stone house with quoins, a band, and a stone slate roof with coped gables. There are two storeys and a symmetrical south front of three bays. The central doorway has monolithic jambs and a sill band tie. Above the doorway is a single-light window in a round-arched recess with imposts and a keystone, and the other windows are mullioned with two lights.	II
Duke of York public house 53.74770°N 1.82381°W		Early 19th century	The public house is in stone and has a stone slate roof with a coped gable on the left, and two storeys. The left part has a symmetrical front of three bays, a central doorway with monolithic jambs, and mullioned windows. To the right is a former barn which contains a segmental-arched cart entry, now infilled, and inserted windows.	II
Boundary stone by Spaniard Hall; 53.75494°N 1.83421°W		Mid-19th century	The stone, which marks the boundary between Shelf and Northowram, is by a wall on a road. It consists of a small arched stone inscribed with a vertical line and the names of the districts.	II
Milestone; 53.74823°N 1.81993°W		Mid-19th century	The milestone is on the northwest side of Halifax Road (A6036 road). It is in stone overlaid with cast iron with a triangular plan, and a rounded top. On the top is inscribed "Bradford and Halifax Road", and "Shelf", and on the sides are the distances to Halifax and Bradford.	II
Stocks; 53.74477°N 1.81848°W		19th century	The stocks, which are a reconstruction, stand by a road junction. They consist of two upright stone posts holding a bottom stone rail with wooden keepers above.	II
Bethel Methodist Church; 53.75648°N 1.80792°W		1853	The chapel is in stone, with a moulded cornice, bracketed gutters, and a pyramidal slate roof. There are two storeys, a square plan with fronts of four bays, and a rear wing forming the Sunday school. The doorways are in the outer bays and have pilasters and cornices, and the windows are semicircular-arched sashes.	II
Lodge and gate piers, Norwood; 53.75333°N 1.81533°W	—	1855	The lodge is in stone with a fish scale slate roof that has gables with pendants and elaborate pierced bargeboards. There is one storey and an L-shaped plan. On the front facing the entrance to the drive is a large bay window, and in the angle is a gabled porch on two columns with an inscribed and dated lintel. The gate piers are square and each has sunk panels, a cornice, and a decorated pyramidal finial.	II
Boundary stone opposite Score Hill; 53.74863°N 1.82502°W		Late 19th century	The stone, which marks the boundary between Shelf Urban District and the Borough of Halifax is by a road junction. It consists of a small arched stone inscribed with a vertical line and the names of the districts.	II
Archway and walls, former Lion Brewery; 53.76186°N 1.81746°W		1897	A gateway in coped stone. In the centre is a pointed arch with a cornice and blocking course surmounted by the statue of a reclining lion. This is flanked by lower walls with embattled parapets, each containing a similar smaller arched entrance.	II
