= Eureka! (museum) =

Children's museum in Yorkshire, England

Eureka! The National Children's Museum
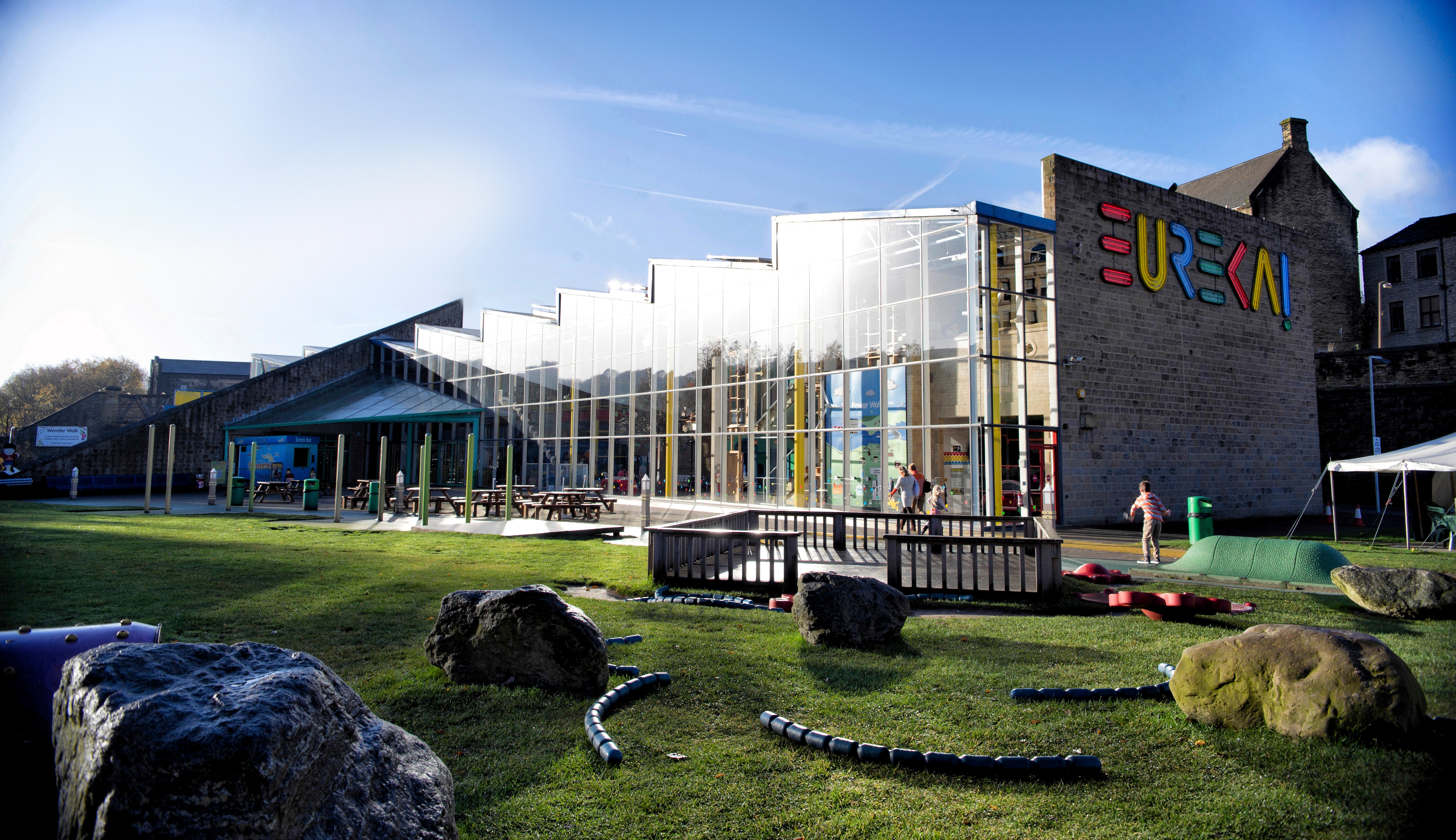
- Exterior of Eureka!
- Established: 1992
- Location: 53°43′12″N 1°51′18″W
- Type: Children's Museum
- Visitors: 300,000 per annum
- Director: Leigh-Anne Stradeski
- Website: eureka.org.uk

Eureka! The National Children's Museum is an interactive educational museum for children in Halifax, West Yorkshire, England, with a focus on learning through play. It is run as an educational charity and not-for-profit organisation. Eureka! is based on the North American model of children's museums, aimed at families with children aged 0–11 and encourages hands-on inter-generational learning.

== History ==
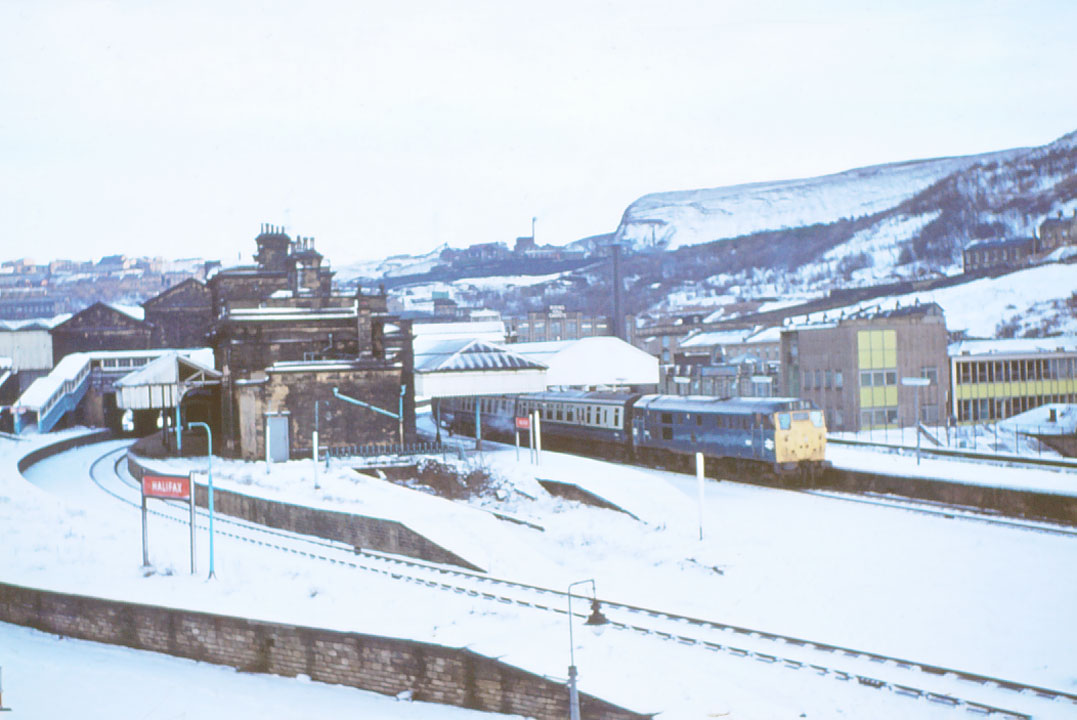
Eureka! is situated on the now demolished parts of Halifax station seen to the left, the remaining platforms can be seen to the right.

The Museum for Children was formally constituted as a registered charity in 1985 by Vivien Duffield who was inspired to create the museum after visiting a children's museum in Boston in the United States. The museum is intended for children aged up to 12 with accompanying adults, and it was established with £9 million funding, £7 million of which came from the Clore and Duffield foundations with the rest from grants and private donations. It is located on former British Rail land next to Halifax railway station. Eureka!'s location was suggested by Prince Charles who thought the empty site particularly suitable for the museum and believed that it can serve as a stimulus for the regeneration of Halifax. Prince Charles opened the museum on 9 July 1992 when he was Prince of Wales and Duke of Cornwall and was its patron until 2002.

The building design was led by Ken Moth of the architectural practice Building Design Partnership (BDP), and the exhibition designs were produced by an in-house team as well as a diverse group of designers who produced various elements of the museum – co-ordinated by Richard Fowler. Design groups included Imagination (the Me and My Body gallery) and Conran (original gift shop) and individuals included Tim Hunkin who created the Archimedes display at the entrance, and Satoshi Kitamura who provide illustration and cartoon signage for the museum.

== Galleries ==
The museum has four main galleries:

- Spark Gallery – Opened July 2017 as part of the museums 25th anniversary celebrations; it is a flexible exhibition space
- All About Me – Opened in March 2013; a £2.9 million gallery, lead funded by the Wellcome Trust, exploring the themes of health, well-being and the human body
- Living and Working Together – A miniature town square (including a bank, fountain, eco street and shops) and house
- SoundSpace – An interactive gallery encouraging children to discover the science of sound and music, with the help of Orby the Alien
- SoundGarden
- Desert Discovery
- The Beach – possibly the largest outdoor sandpit in the North of England.
- The Wonder Walk – An outdoor sensory trail
