= Tony Comber =

Anglican Archdeacon (1927–2022)

Anthony James Comber (20 April 1927 – 6 July 2022) was Archdeacon of Leeds from 1982 to 1992.

Tony Comber studied Mining Engineering at the University of Leeds, commencing his studies in 1946 and proceeding to a B. Sc. degree.

He had a great interest in left-wing politics and was a long-time member of the Labour Party.

Comber was vicar of Oulton from 1960 to 1969; and then of Hunslet from 1969 to 1977. He was Rector of Farnley from 1977 to 1982.

Comber died on 6 July 2022, at the age of 95.
