= Calderdale Way =

Long-distance footpath in West Yorkshire, England

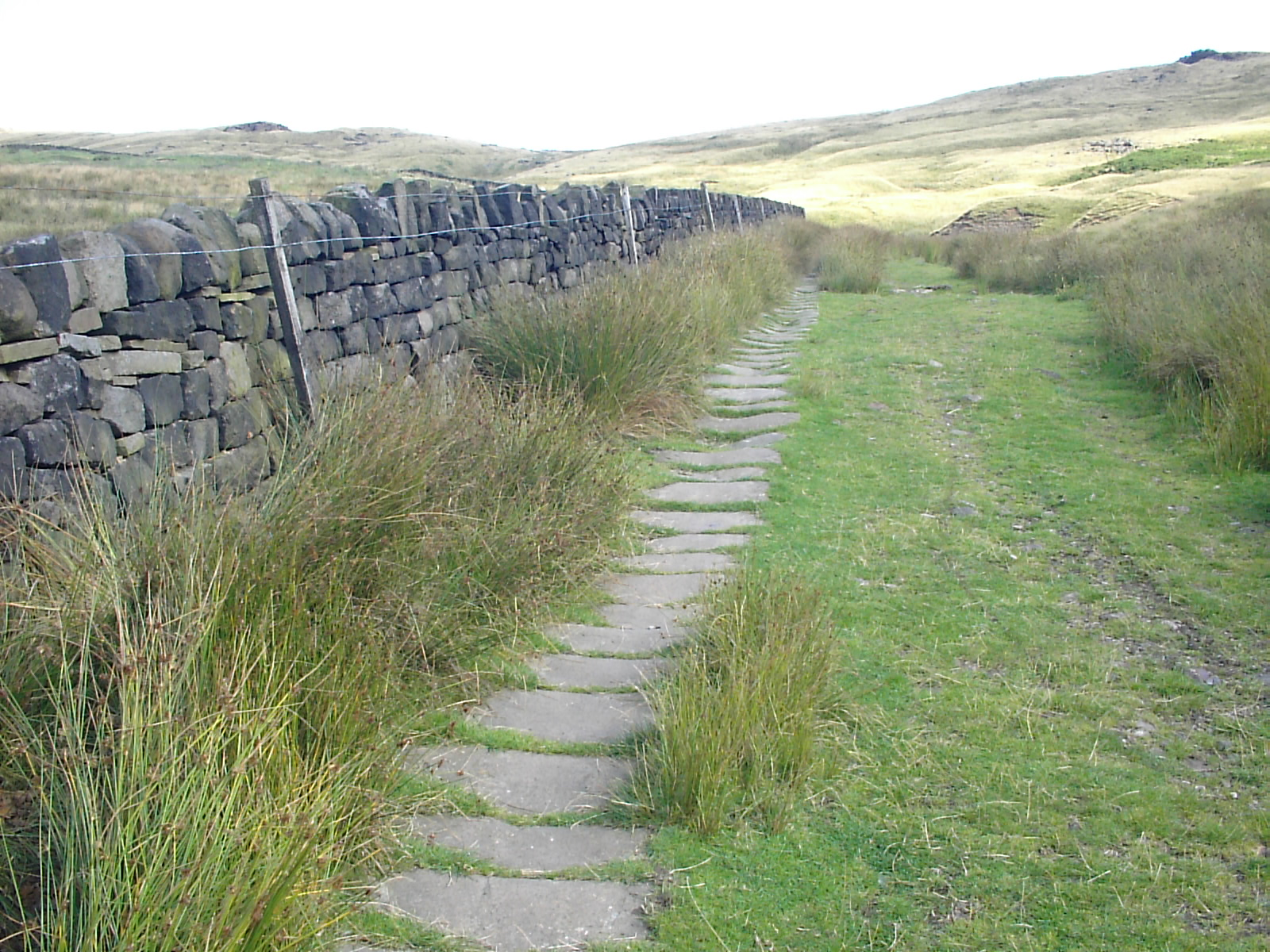
- Calderdale Way near Mankinholes
- Length: 50 miles (80 km)
- Location: Calderdale, West Yorkshire
- Established: 1978
- Trailheads: West Vale near Elland (circular)
- Use: Hiking, Fell-running
- Elevation gain/loss: 2,595 metres (8,514 ft)
- Highest point: 379 metres (1,243 ft)
- Difficulty: challenging

The Calderdale Way is a 50-mile (80 km) long-distance footpath in West Yorkshire, England. It was devised in the 1970s to draw attention to attractions in the Calderdale district which was being established at that time.

The route is circular and walks can be started at any point. The official start is at Clay House in West Vale and the route includes much exposed moorland, woodland paths, a short section of canal towpath and some road sections. It passes through several settlements, including Ripponden, Mankinholes, Todmorden, Heptonstall, Holdsworth, Shelf and Brighouse. One published guidebook divides the walk into four day-long sections.

- West Vale–Mankinholes (13.5 miles/21.7 km)
- Mankinholes–Heptonstall (11.5 miles/18.5 km)
- Heptonstall–Catherine Slack (11.5 miles/18.5 km)
- Catherine Slack–West Vale (13.5 miles/21.7 km)

The route is the basis for the annual Calderdale Way Relay organised by Halifax Harriers.

The Calderdale Way Ultra now takes in the whole 50 miles organised by Cannonball Events.
