= Paul Ayers =

British ecclesiastical officer

Paul Nicholas Ayers (b September 1961) has been Archdeacon of Leeds since 2017.

Ayers was educated at St Peter's College, Oxford and Trinity College, Bristol. He was ordained in 1986.
His posts up to 2017 were

- 1985-88: Curate St John the Baptist, Clayton, West Yorkshire
- 1988-91: Curate, St Andrew, Keighley
- 1991-1997: Vicar St Cuthbert, Wrose
- 1997-2017:Vicar, SS Laurence & Paul, Pudsey
