= Leslie Boreham =

English judge

Sir Leslie Kenneth Edward Boreham (19 October 1918 – 2 May 2004) was an English barrister and judge. He presided over two high-profile court cases, of the Yorkshire Ripper Peter Sutcliffe (1981) and Brighton bomber Patrick Magee (1986).

== Biography ==
Boreham was born in Higham, Suffolk, and educated at Bungay Grammar School. He served with the RAFVR during World War II.

In 1947, he was Called to the Bar at Lincoln's Inn, and became a Bencher in 1972. He was Deputy Chairman of the South Eastern Circuit from 1962 to 1965, and Chairman from 1965 to 1971.

He was appointed QC in 1965 and was Recorder of Margate from 1968 to 1971. In 1972, he was knighted. From 1974 until 1982 he was Chairman of the Lord Chancellor's Committee on the Training of Magistrates. He was a Judge of the High Court, Queen's Bench Division from 1972 to 1992; and Presiding Judge of the North Eastern Circuit from 1974 to 1980.
