= Shelf, West Yorkshire =

Village in West Yorkshire, England

Coordinates: 53.752719°N 1.811911°W

Shelf
- St. Michael and All Angels Church

- Location within West Yorkshire
- Population: 11,618 (Northowram and Shelf Ward. 2011 census)
- OS grid reference: SE125285
- Metropolitan borough: Calderdale
- Metropolitan county: West Yorkshire
- Region: Yorkshire and the Humber
- Country: England
- Sovereign state: United Kingdom
- Post town: HALIFAX
- Postcode district: HX3
- Dialling code: 01274 6 and 01422 2
- Police: West Yorkshire
- Fire: West Yorkshire
- Ambulance: Yorkshire

The Stone Chair milestone, first erected in 1737

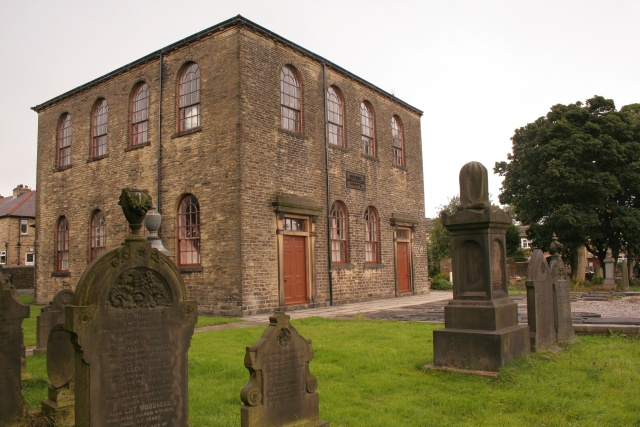
Bethel Chapel

Shelf is a village in the Calderdale district of West Yorkshire, England. The village is situated approximately 3 miles (4.8 km) north-east of Halifax and 5 miles (8 km) south-west of Bradford, on the A6036 road. In 2001 it had a population of 4,496. At the 2011 Census Shelf was measured as part of the Calderdale ward of Northowram and Shelf.

== History ==
In the Domesday Book the village is called "Scelf." The place name probably derives from the Anglo Saxon word 'Scelf', suggesting a broad and level shelf of land. In the period before 1700 Shelf developed from a mixed moorland and forested landscape to a few scattered farmsteads; to a landscape full of activity.

Shelf gained a number of mills and workers cottages during the Industrial Revolution, and there are a number of historical relics including a stone horse trough and a stone chair milestone originally erected in 1737 which gave rise to the local area being named Stone Chair, Shelf. Prior to 1851, Shelf was a part of the large Parish of Halifax. The Parish Church of Shelf St. Michael and All Angels Church was built in 1850 and there were a number of chapels of other denominations, including the Independent Methodist Bethel Chapel, dating from 1853. On a secular level the village was administered by a 'Local Board' established in 1863, and then by the 'Shelf Urban District Council' from 1894 to 1937.

From 1937 to 1974, Shelf formed part of Queensbury and Shelf, an urban district in the West Riding of Yorkshire. Queensbury and Shelf consisted of Queensbury and Shelf. Queensbury and Shelf Urban District Council was abolished on 31 March 1974, under the Local Government Act 1972, with Shelf becoming part of the Metropolitan Borough of Calderdale, and Queensbury becoming part of the Metropolitan Borough of Bradford.

Shelf village centre has many shops and facilities such as a bakery and pharmacy. There is a Village Hall, and a new library was opened in 2009. There is a local Lidl supermarket. The village is on the route of the Calderdale Way, a 50 miles (80 km) circular walk around the hills and valleys of Calderdale.

== Notable residents ==
Joseph Jagger, a man reputed to have broken the bank at Monte Carlo was born at Shelf although, contrary to popular belief, he did not inspire the song "The Man Who Broke the Bank at Monte Carlo." Lucius Smith the first Bishop of Knaresborough was born at the Vicarage at Shelf in 1860. Kathleen Hale, author of the series of children's books about Orlando the Marmalade Cat also lived at the vicarage from 1903 to 1905, and developed her interest in plants, flowers and drawing there. Edward Hartley, an early socialist politician retired to Shelf, and is buried at Bethel Chapel in the village.

Much-travelled footballer Frank Worthington was born in the village, as was interior designer and TV presenter Linda Barker. Former Blue Peter presenter John Noakes was born at the Royal Halifax Infirmary in Halifax, but his home was in Shelf. Coronation Street actor Joe Duttine is also from the village.

== See also ==
- Listed buildings in Shelf, West Yorkshire
