= Greetland railway station =

Disused railway station in West Yorkshire, England

Greetland
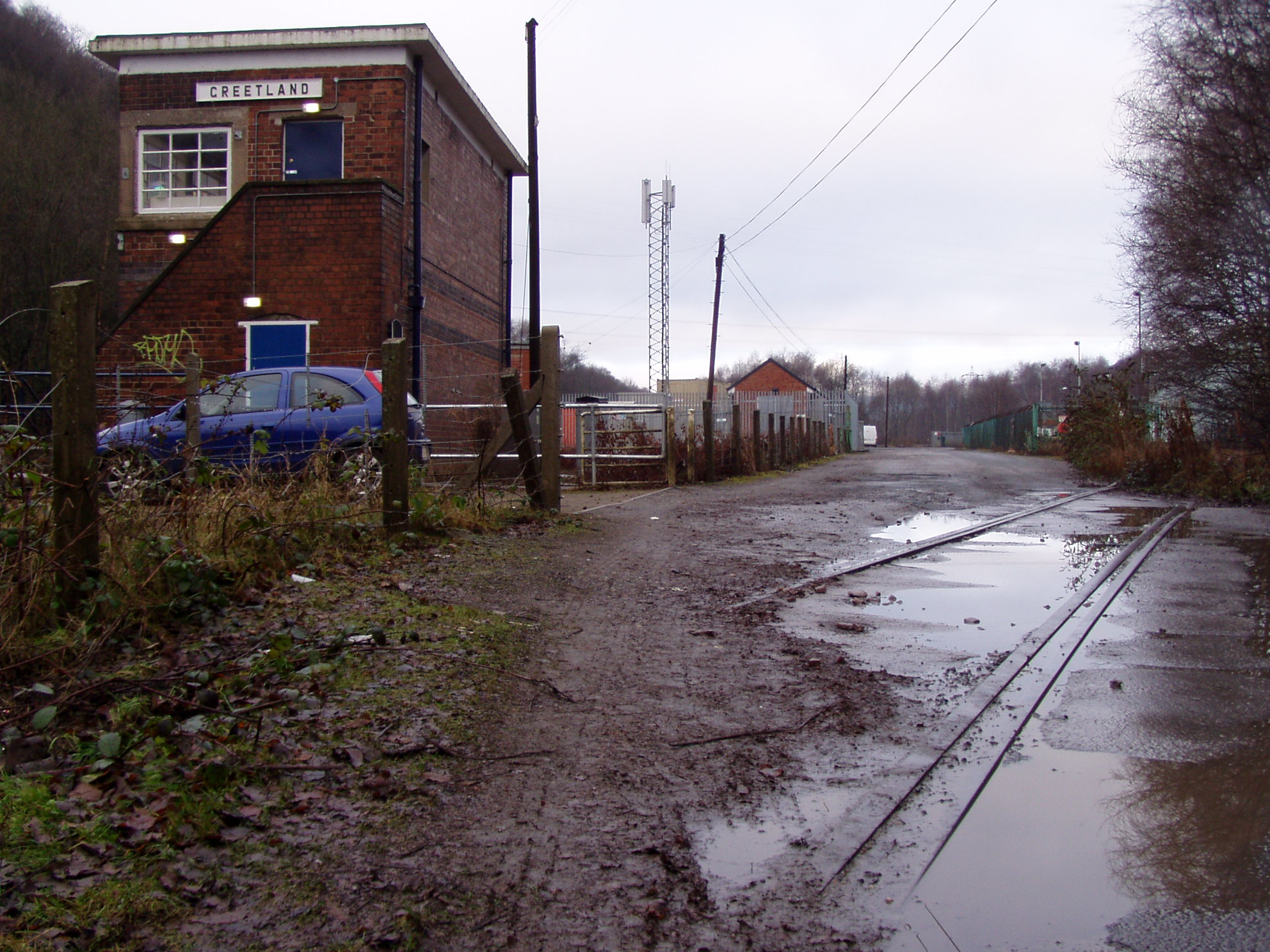
- Greetland signal box, on the former site of Greetland railway station.

General information
- Location: Greetland, Calderdale; England
- Coordinates: 53.693454°N 1.856775°W
- Grid reference: SE095218
- Platforms: 2

Other information
- Status: Disused

History
- Original company: Manchester and Leeds Railway
- Pre-grouping: Lancashire and Yorkshire Railway
- Post-grouping: London Midland and Scottish Railway

Key dates
- 1 July 1844: Station opens as North Dean
- 1897: renamed Greetland
- 8 September 1962: Station closes
- 1965: Station demolished
Location

Greetland railway station was a railway station that served the village of Greetland in West Yorkshire, England.

== History ==
The station was originally opened as North Dean in July 1844. It was subsequently changed to North Dean and Greetland and then to Greetland in 1897. Situated near the junction of the main Calder Valley line and the steeply-graded branch towards Halifax (which opened at the same time as the station), it also served as the junction station for the Stainland Branch from its opening in 1875 until 1929. It was closed to passenger traffic on 8 September 1962.

The signal box seen in the picture was reopened in 2000 after a prolonged period of disuse but closed in August 2009 (along with its neighbour at Elland). By December 2009 it had been demolished. The junction and associated signalling is now operated from York ROC following the closure of Healey Mills PSB which took over when Greetland closed.

Preceding station	Historical railways	Following station
Halifax; Line and station open	Lancashire and Yorkshire Railway; Manchester and Leeds Railway	Elland; Line open, station closed
Sowerby Bridge; Line and station open	Lancashire and Yorkshire Railway; Manchester and Leeds Railway	Elland; Line open, station closed
	Disused railways	
Halifax; Line and station open	Lancashire and Yorkshire Railway; Stainland Branch	Rochdale Road Halt; Line and station closed
