= Donald Bartlett =

Anglican priest and author

Donald Mackenzie Maynard Bartlett (25 August 1873 – 16 October 1969) was an Anglican priest and author.

Bartlett was educated at Haileybury; Clare College, Cambridge; and Wells Theological College. He was ordained in 1896. After curacies in Bethnal Green, Ashill and Leeds he was Vicar of St Mark, Leeds. During the First World War he was a Chaplain to the British Armed Forces. He was Vicar of St Wilfrid, Harrogate from 1919 to 1940; Rural Dean of Knaresborough from 1935 to 1937; Archdeacon of Leeds from 1937 to 1940; Archdeacon of Richmond from 1940 to 1951; and a Canon Residentiary at Ripon Cathedral from 1940 until 1961.
