= Charles Ellison =

Charles Ottley Ellison (8 February 1898 – 12 December 1978) was an Anglican ecclesiastic who was Archdeacon of Leeds from 1950 to 1969.

Ellison was educated at Wrekin College; the University of Leeds; and Ripon College Cuddesdon. During the First World War he was an Officer with the King's Own Yorkshire Light Infantry. He was ordained in 1933 and his first post was a curacy at St Chad, Far Headingley. He was Vicar of Kippax from 1937 to 1946; Rural Dean of Whitkirk from 1944 to 1946; Vicar of Wetherby from 1946 to 1955; and Vicar of Briggate from 1955 to 1965.
