= Archdeacon of Leeds =

Church of England ecclesiastical office

The Archdeacon of Leeds, previously Archdeacon of Ripon, is a senior ecclesiastical officer within the Diocese of Leeds. As such they are responsible for the disciplinary supervision of the clergy within the four deaneries (Allerton, Armley, Headingley and Whitkirk) making up the archdeaconry of Leeds. Until 2014, the post was in the Diocese of Ripon.

Since the creation of the Diocese of Leeds on 20 April 2014 (approved by the General Synod on 8 July 2013) the archdeaconry forms the Leeds episcopal area. Paul Ayers has been incumbent archdeacon since from 28 February 2017.

== List of archdeacons ==
The archdeaconry was founded (as the Archdeaconry of Ripon) on 31 August 1894, from the Archdeaconries of Richmond and of Craven

- 1895–1905 (ret.): Arthur Waugh
- December 1905 – 1934 (d.): Lucius Smith, Bishop suffragan of Knaresborough

The archdeaconry was renamed the Archdeaconry of Leeds on 15 March 1921.

- 1934–1937 (res.): Paul de Labilliere, Bishop suffragan of Knaresborough
- 1937–1940 (res.): Donald Bartlett
- 1940–1950 (res.): Lovell Clarke
- 1950–1969 (ret.): Charles Ellison (afterwards archdeacon emeritus)
- 1969–1981 (ret.): Alfred Page (afterwards archdeacon emeritus)
- 1982–1992 (ret.): Tony Comber (afterwards archdeacon emeritus)
- 1992–2005 (ret.): John Oliver
- 2005–2012 (res.): Peter Burrows
- 2012 – 31 October 2016 (ret.): Paul Hooper
- 1 November 2016 – 2017 (acting): Arani Sen
- 28 February 2017 – present: Paul Ayers
