= West Vale =

Village in West Yorkshire, England

Coordinates: 53.687676°N 1.854782°W

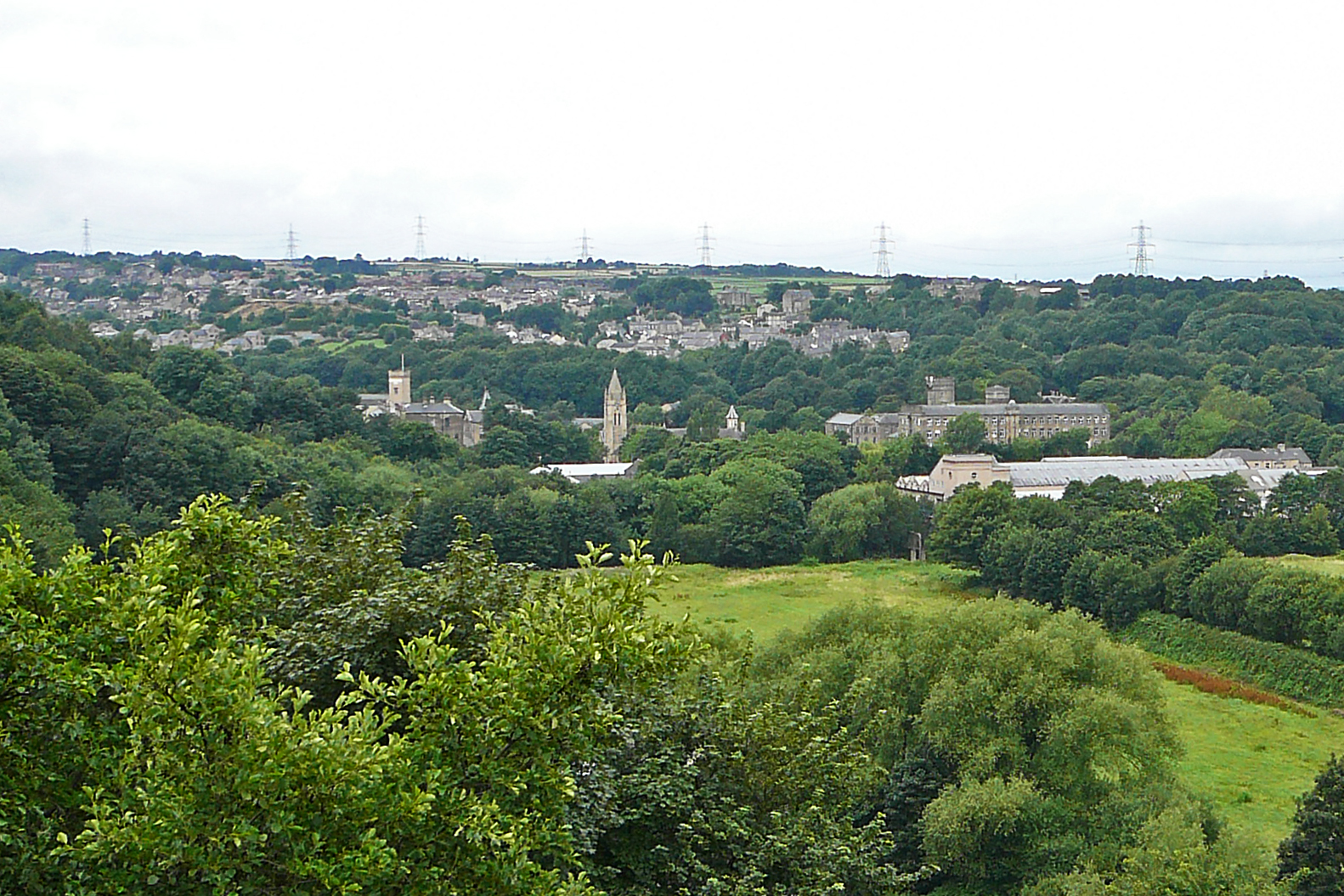
- View toward West Vale from Elland, with Greetland in the background

- Location within West Yorkshire
- OS grid reference: SE096212
- Metropolitan borough: Calderdale
- Metropolitan county: West Yorkshire
- Region: Yorkshire and the Humber
- Country: England
- Sovereign state: United Kingdom
- Post town: HALIFAX
- Postcode district: HX4
- Dialling code: 01422
- Police: West Yorkshire
- Fire: West Yorkshire
- Ambulance: Yorkshire
- UK Parliament: Calder Valley

West Vale is a village in Calderdale, West Yorkshire, England. The village falls within the Greetland and Stainland parish of the Calderdale Council. It is 2.5 miles (4.0 km) south of Halifax, 2 miles (3.2 km) west of Elland and 4 miles (6.4 km) north-west of Huddersfield.

== Location ==
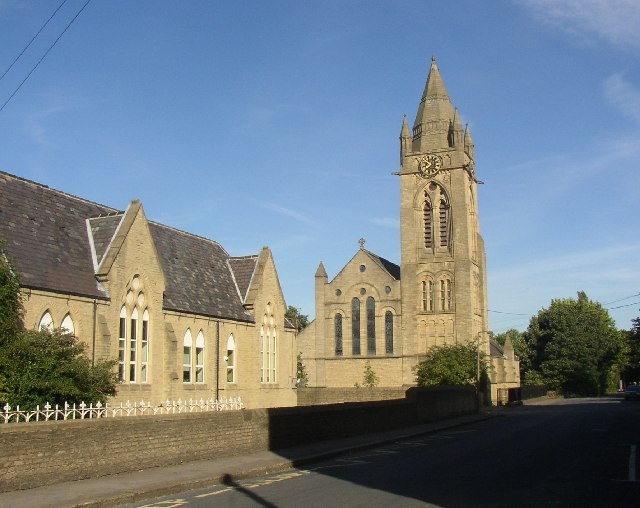
West Vale school

West Vale is situated directly east of Greetland and is primarily based around Rochdale Road, Saddleworth Road and Stainland Road. These roads form a triangle within West Vale.

West Vale is part of Greetland. The reason it is not called East Vale is because it used to be part of Elland District Council who historically 'gave' the area to Greetland. The village contains an office for UK construction, infrastructure and facilities management company Carillion PLC. It is home to Heath RUFC and Greetland CC. West Vale also boasts many hairdressers and also, a park 'Clay House Park' with the West Vale Primary School nearby.

Clay House is also on the route of the Calderdale Way. This is a 50-mile circular walk around the hills and valleys of Calderdale.

== History and amenities ==
West Vale is now gaining popularity as a dining and socialising location. After being reduced to just one pub, The Queen, The Travellers Rest has reopened, and a wine bar has been established in Andy Thornton's Antique centre, with an Indian restaurant and a cafe taking other units, making the place a popular destination in the evenings. The Co-op supermarket (built on the site of 'The Shears') and Tesco Express (within Andy Thorntons Antique centre) are now the main retail outlets. Two clothes shops, a large veterinary surgery, several cafes, a charity shop and two dog grooming parlours indicate a prospering retail business. West Vale also houses the Stainland Road Medical Centre. One of the big old mills is now used by a recycling and packaging company while another one serves as a storehouse of fibre for the manufacture of niche textiles. Andy Thornton's showroom is the venue for BBC One's The Bidding Room.

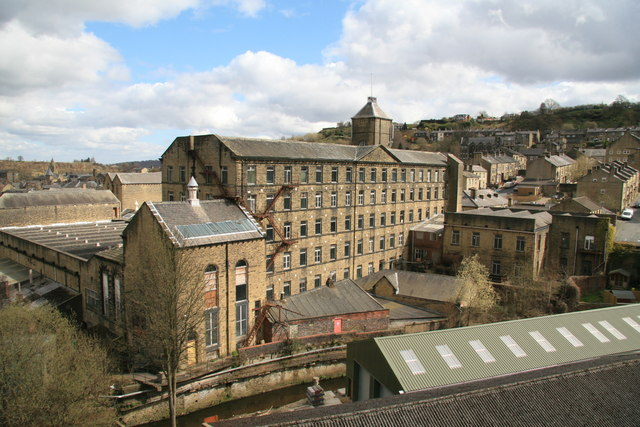
West Vale mills

The closure of Elland Bridge after damage in 2015 famous Boxing Day's floods added extra traffic onto West Vale. Traffic is likely to be troubled when demolition commences of the big Horsfall's Mill complex. The mill on Stainland Road has a tall tower topped with mobile phone aerials.

The old railway viaduct of the Stainland branch is a prominent feature in the village. It was closed to rail traffic in the early 1960s, but in mid 2015 it was paved and opened as part of a planned long-distance walkway stretching through Copley to Sowerby Bridge. Between Copley and Sowerby Bridge some impressive lakes are being constructed along the walkway.

A hidden stream called Black Brook flows through West Vale. It is usually quite clear so perhaps the name dates back to ancient mining or textiles use. It starts at Scammonden Dam, drains Greetland and is joined by the stream that drains Holywell Green and Stainland which means heavy rain can cause it to run very high and fast on occasion. It usually runs clear enough for the small number of trout to be seen. The fish attract heron and mink, with dipper and kingfisher also to be seen in places where the stream is visible behind fences and walls. There are several rises of trout flies each year with the most impressive being a late spring one of very large flies that emerge on warm evenings at sunset and are spectacularly illuminated by the setting sun.

== See also ==
- Listed buildings in Greetland and Stainland
