= Greetland =

Village in West Yorkshire, England

Coordinates: 53.686942°N 1.871393°W

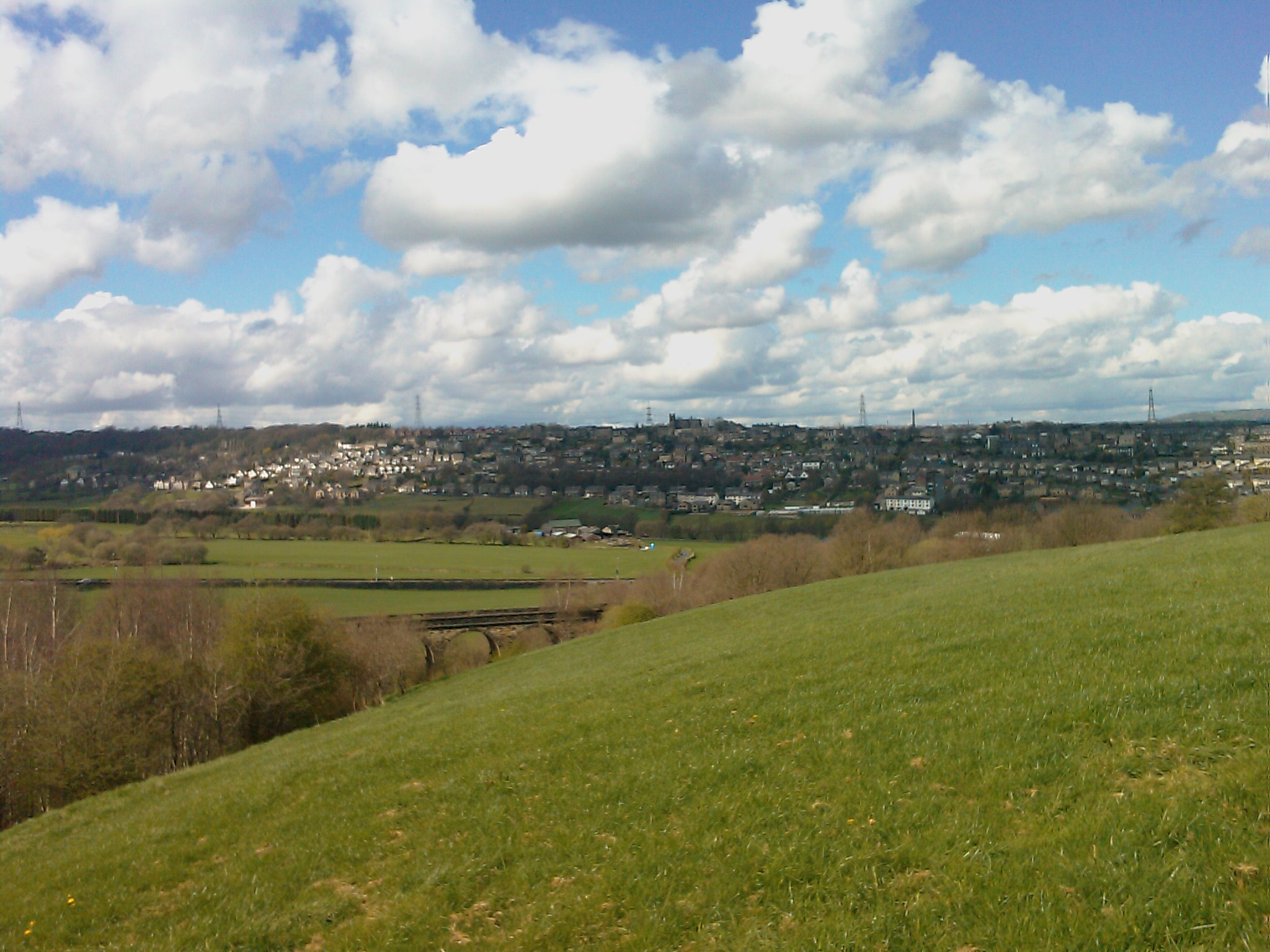
- Greetland, as seen from Holywell Green

- Location within West Yorkshire
- Population: 11,389 (and Stainland)(2011 Census)
- OS grid reference: SE085211
- Metropolitan borough: Calderdale
- Metropolitan county: West Yorkshire
- Region: Yorkshire and the Humber
- Country: England
- Sovereign state: United Kingdom
- Post town: HALIFAX
- Postcode district: HX4
- Dialling code: 01422
- Police: West Yorkshire
- Fire: West Yorkshire
- Ambulance: Yorkshire
- UK Parliament: Calder Valley

Greetland is a village situated within the metropolitan borough of Calderdale, West Yorkshire, England. It falls within the Calderdale Ward of Greetland and Stainland. According to the 2011 Census, this ward had a population of 11,389. Geographically, Greetland is approximately 1 mile (1.6 km) west of Elland and 2.5 miles (4.0 km) south of Halifax.

Historical records from 1870–1872, documented in John Marius Wilson's Imperial Gazetteer of England and Wales, describe Greetland as a village and chapelry in the Halifax parish, West Riding of Yorkshire. The village is noted to have been situated 1 mile west of the Elland railway station and 3 miles south-southwest of Halifax.

It had amenities such as a post office under Halifax's jurisdiction during that period. The chapelry formed a part of the Elland-cum-Greetland township. The population at the time was 2,584, with local industries including stone quarries and several large mills producing woollens, worsted, and cotton.

== History ==
The origins of Greetland may trace back to a Roman settlement, potentially identified as Cambodunum. This hypothesis is supported by the discovery of a Roman altar stone, dated to 208 AD, found in 1597 at Bank Top in Greetland.

From 1844 to 1962, Greetland was served by the Greetland railway station.

Greetland was formerly a chapelry in the parish of Halifax, in 1894 Greetland became an urban district, on 31 December 1894 Greetland became a civil parish, being formed from the part of the parish of Elland with Greetland in Greetland Urban District, on 1 April 1937 the district was abolished and merged with Elland Urban District. On 1 April 1937 the parish was abolished and merged with Elland. In 1931 the parish had a population of 4299.

The passage of Stage 2 of the 2014 Tour de France from York to Sheffield passed through the village on 6 July 2014. The race route traversed east to west, originating from neighbouring Barkisland, through West Vale, and concluding in Elland. One of the stage's climbs, the Category 3 Côte de Greetland, occurred here at the 119.5-kilometre mark. Cyril Lemoine of Cofidis secured 2 points in the King of the Mountain competition, with David de la Cruz of Team Netapp-Endura earning the remaining point.

== Geography ==
Greetland is situated primarily around Stainland, Saddleworth and Rochdale Roads, with much of the village on one side of the steep hill that separates the latter two roads. Saddleworth Road and Rochdale Road meet at a double traffic junction in a small commercial area called West Vale.

"The old part of Greetland was strung out along what is now the B6113 to the west. In the late 19C a new town known as West Vale developed in the valley, and a school and church were built (SE097213). The name stems from being at the western end of Elland, although it is at the eastern end of Greetland which was an independent authority only from 1894 to 1937." Humphrey Bolton.

== Landmarks ==
=== Clay House ===
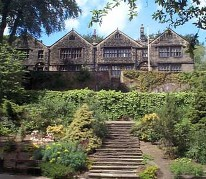
Back view of Clay House's southern wing

Clay House was built for John Clay and the Clay family around 1650, although there is a 1296 mention of a house owned by Robert Clay on the site. The grounds of the house were opened as a park in 1924, and in 1929, a war memorial was built in the hall. The house is frequently used for weddings and its main hall can seat over 100 people. Its corridors and grand rooms are well known in the area, with a large central staircase, traditional wooden panelling from the 1600s and paintings. The house is currently managed by Calderdale Council. There is another war memorial on the eastern wall of the house. Clay House is the starting point of the Calderdale Way.

=== Calderdale Way ===
Greetland is the start of the Calderdale Way, a long-distance footpath popular with ramblers.

=== Public Houses ===
==== Druid's Arms (closed 2004) ====
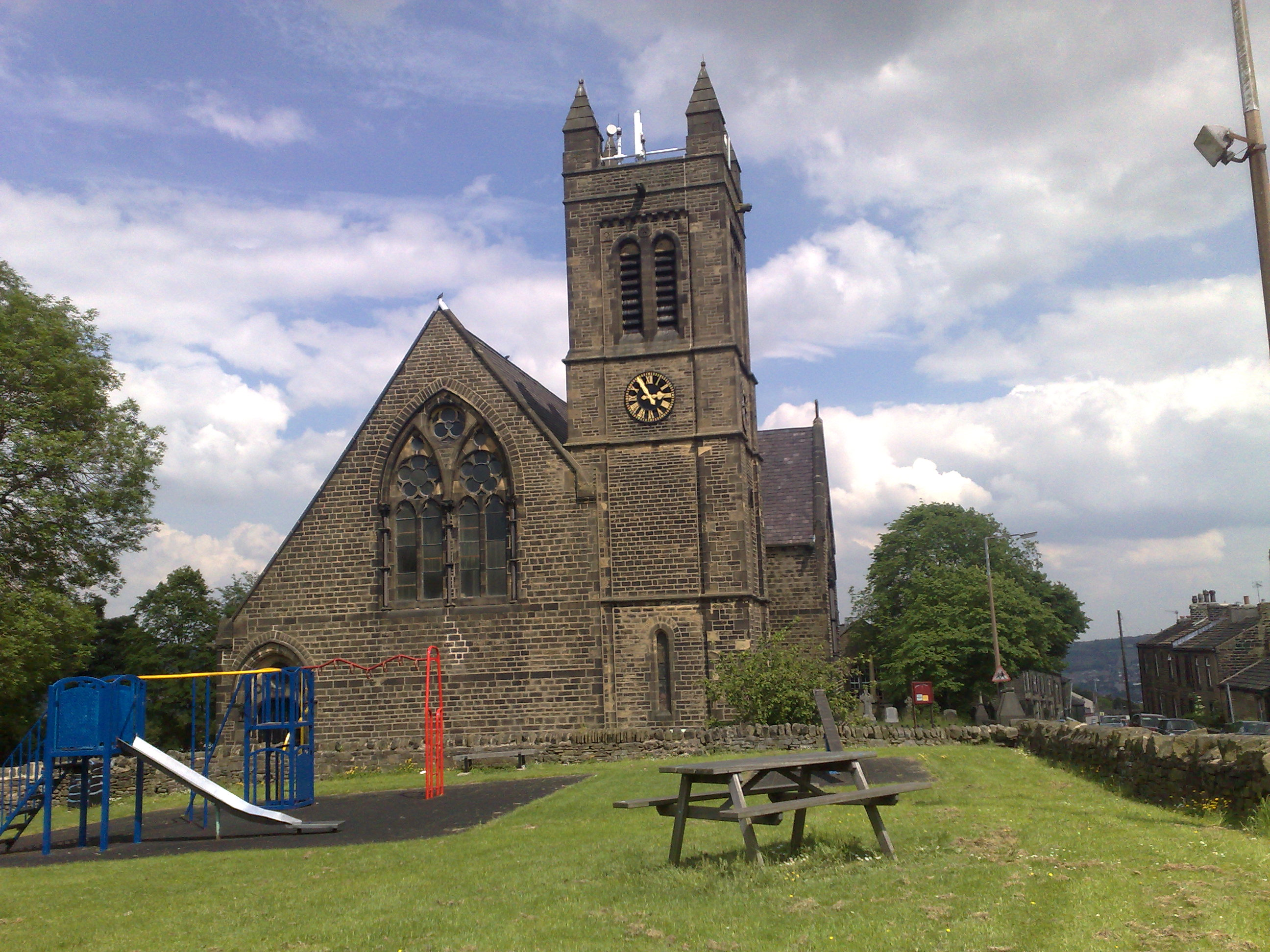
St Thomas's Church, Greetland with the Community Centre playground in the foreground.

Perhaps the oldest public house in Greetland, the Druids Arms is known locally as the "Rat". The sign outside the pub was altered by the current landlord to reflect this.

The pub has been at the centre of a planning dispute with local residents. Since its closure on 17 October 2004, the landlord has applied for planning permission to turn the pub into flats. However, a local residents' committee is attempting to launch objections to the proposed change.

The Druids Arms appears in local folklore: Greetland is the home of 'Brandy Hole Wood'. The origin of the wood's name is ingrained in local folklore. It is said by local residents that, in order to avoid paying excessive tax on his stockpiled alcohol, a pre-20th century landlord of the Druids Arms would roll barrels of spirits into the wood in order to hide them. When the taxman came to take an inventory of the pub's cellar he could not account for the hidden barrels, and so the landlord avoided paying tax on the barrels stashed in the woods.

According to another version of the story, it was the locals who hid the brandy in the wood, and concerned at his lost revenue, the landlord of the Druids Arms informed the taxman of the hidden stash. This is what earned the pub the nickname "The Rat".

The cottage attached to the pub was sold in March 2008, and was extended in 2022.

==== Golden Fleece (closed 2008) ====
This pub came to nationwide media attention in early January 2008. The landlord, who was later found to have been trading under his son's alcohol licence, had been publicly flouting the smoking ban that was introduced throughout England in July 2007. It was alleged that he had allowed customers to smoke inside his pub, and had either taken down non-smoking signs or written over them with 'Smoking Allowed'. The pub had allegedly received support from smokers and non-smokers alike in Halifax, Bradford, Huddersfield and Leeds. The landlord stated that he had received phone calls of support from Germany, Croatia and the USA. He announced in 2008 that he would open another pub in Huddersfield, The College Arms, where he would also allow his customers to smoke. He said that he wished to create a small smoking area, leaving most of the pub a non-smoking venue.

== Education ==
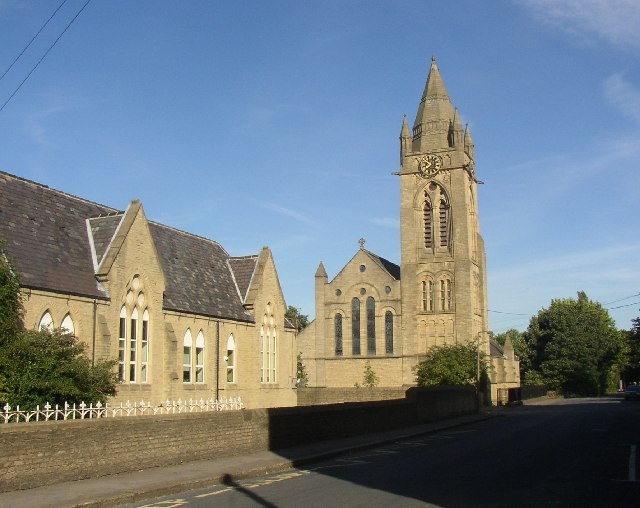
West Vale school and church

Schools include Greetland Junior and Infant School and the West Vale Primary School, Greetland Infant School on Saddleworth Road, (for children aged 4–6), and Greetland Junior School, on School Street/Rochdale Road (for children aged 6–11).

Greetland Academy has two campuses, one on School Street, the other on Saddleworth Road.

Greetland has schools for both Key Stage 1 and Key Stage 2. The Key Stage 1 school, Sunnybank, is on Saddleworth Road. The Key Stage 2 mixed school, Greetland Academy School, is on School Street, and teaches approximately 383 pupils within an age range of 4 to 11.

== Sport ==
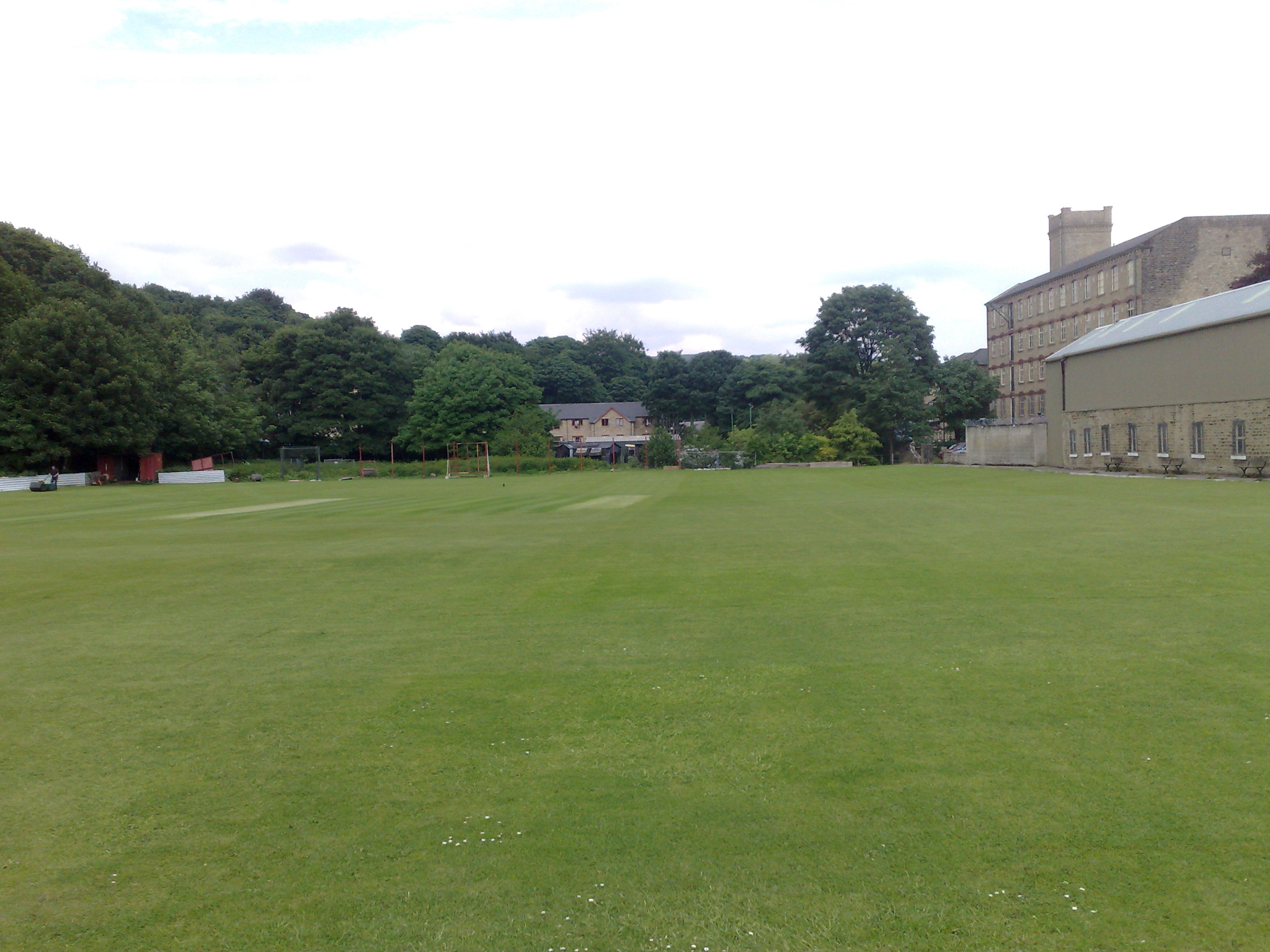
Greetland Cricket & Bowling Club, with the rear of the 'Andy Thontons' building to the right. The bowling green is directly behind the row of trees in the centre of the picture.

Sporting facilities in Greetland include the "Greetland Community Centre", which consists of an indoor multi-purpose pitch, as well as several outdoor natural grass pitches. The venue also has a small bar area that was voted club of the year 2007 by CAMRA.

The community centre is home to the Greetland Goldstars Football Club and Elland Boxers rugby club, which has various teams in different age groups playing in the local junior football leagues.

Their motto is "To win fairly and to lose with honour".

The club achieved FA Charter Standard Development Club Status in January 2007.

Founded in 1858 the "Greetland Cricket & Bowling Club" is still active and the club competes in the "Halifax League", playing host to teams from around Calderdale and Kirklees. The pitch is on the banks of a small river and is prone to flooding.

The Greetland Social Club has three table tennis teams which play in the Halifax Table Tennis League.

Various local rugby league teams play at the Greetland All Rounders rugby ground. The site contains an indoor bar and meeting area and a floodlit outdoor pitch. The ground is often used for community events and is used regularly by the district Scout Groups.

=== Scouts ===
Greetland has a Scout Group operating as the 5th Greetland Scout Group, which comprises Beavers, Cubs and Scouts. Explorer Scouts operate from the nearby West Vale HQ. The group is based in the St Thomas' Church Hall. Other venues are used when holding meetings for special events and activities. The group is part of the Pennine Calder District Scouts.

== Notable people ==
- Lord Shutt of Greetland (former local councilor)

== See also ==
- Listed buildings in Greetland and Stainland
