= Halifax railway station (England) =

Railway station in West Yorkshire, England

Halifax
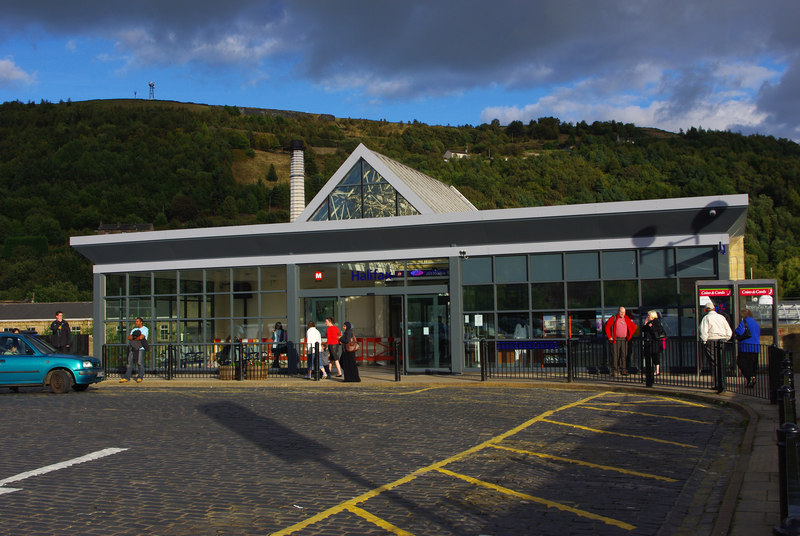
- Station entrance from the forecourt

General information
- Location: Halifax, Calderdale; England
- Coordinates: 53.720650°N 1.853790°W
- Grid reference: SE097249
- Managed by: Northern
- Transit authority: West Yorkshire (Metro)
- Platforms: 2

Other information
- Station code: HFX
- Fare zone: 4
- Classification: DfT category C2

History
- Original company: Manchester and Leeds Railway
- Pre-grouping: Lancashire and Yorkshire Railway
- Post-grouping: London, Midland and Scottish Railway

Key dates
- 1 July 1844: First station opened as Halifax Shaw Syke
- 7 August 1850: Resited and named Halifax
- 23 June 1855: Permanent buildings opened
- 1885–86: Rebuilt and enlarged
- June 1890: Renamed Halifax Old
- 30 September 1951: Renamed Halifax Town
- 12 June 1961: Renamed Halifax

Passengers
- 2020/21: ▼0.369 million
- Interchange: ▼15,671
- 2021/22: ▲1.165 million
- Interchange: ▲49,706
- 2022/23: ▲1.419 million
- Interchange: ▲56,092
- 2023/24: ▲1.621 million
- Interchange: ▼54,635
- 2024/25: ▲1.803 million
- Interchange: ▲55,050
Location
Notes
- Passenger statistics from the Office of Rail and Road

Halifax railway station serves the town of Halifax in West Yorkshire, England. It lies on the Calder Valley line and is 17 miles (27 km) west from Leeds.

Platform 2 is used by eastbound services towards Bradford and Leeds, while platform 1 accommodates westbound trains towards Brighouse, Huddersfield, Sowerby Bridge, Blackpool North and Manchester Victoria. The two routes divide about a mile south of the station at Dryclough Junction.

To the east, the line also divided with the current line passing into Beacon Hill tunnel and a disused line via Halifax North Bridge to Ovenden, then going on to a junction at Holmfield with the Halifax High level line which had stations in Pellon and at St Paul's, Queens Road; and via Queensbury to Bradford and Keighley, for destinations in the North-West.

== Description ==
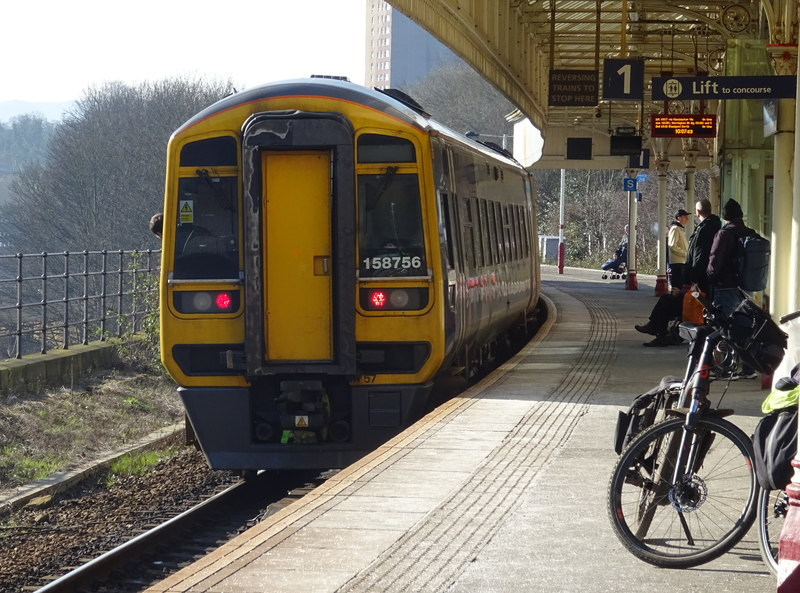
A Northern Trains Class 158 at platform 1

The station has a car park, bicycle parking and a pick up point, like many other stations. There is also a staffed ticket booth with option of paying for a ticket using a ticket machine. A lift to the platform is available for wheelchair users, but there are currently no lower counters for easier access to buy tickets.

Entry to the station is via a cobbled road bridge from opposite the bottom of Horton Street.

== History ==
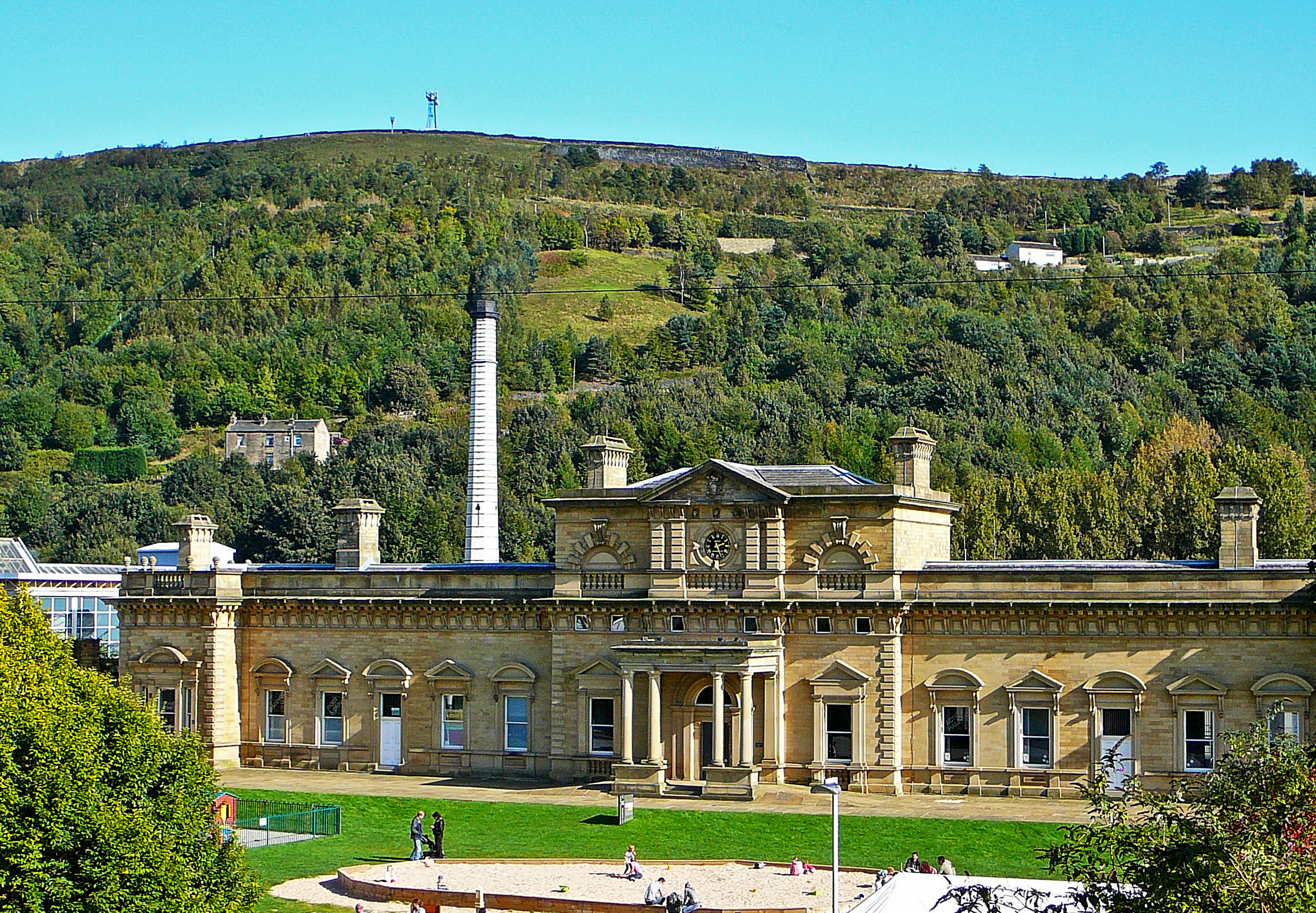
The former station frontage, now known as the 1855 Building by Eureka!

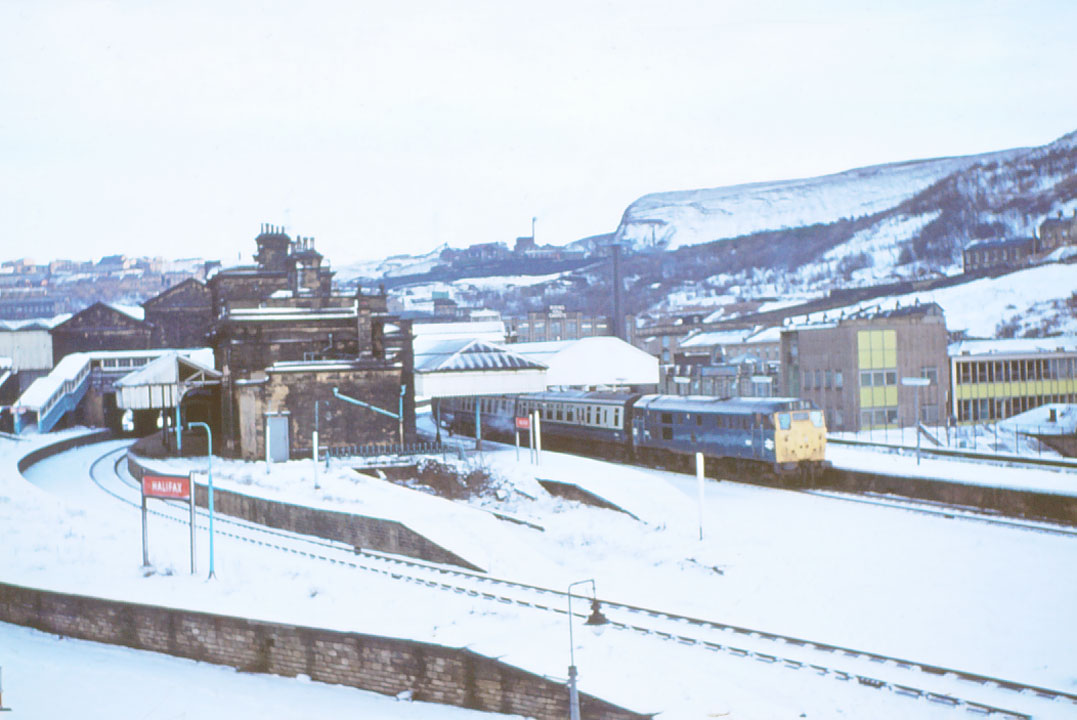
A Brush Class 31 awaits departure with the 0835 train to London at Halifax in 1973, at the current Leeds-bound platform. The platforms to the left no longer remain and are occupied by Eureka!.

The original station was built at Shaw Syke, approximately 500 yards (460 m) south of the current location and opened on 1 July 1844 by the Manchester and Leeds Railway as the terminus of a branch off its main line from Manchester to Normanton. With the opening of the line between Halifax and Bradford on 7 August 1850, a new station was opened on the current site; this had temporary wooden buildings. The station at Shaw Syke was then extended and used as a goods depot The permanent buildings at the current site were designed by Thomas Butterworth and opened on 23 June 1855. This Grade II listed building housed the nursery associated with the Eureka! Children's Museum until its closure on 18 December 2020.

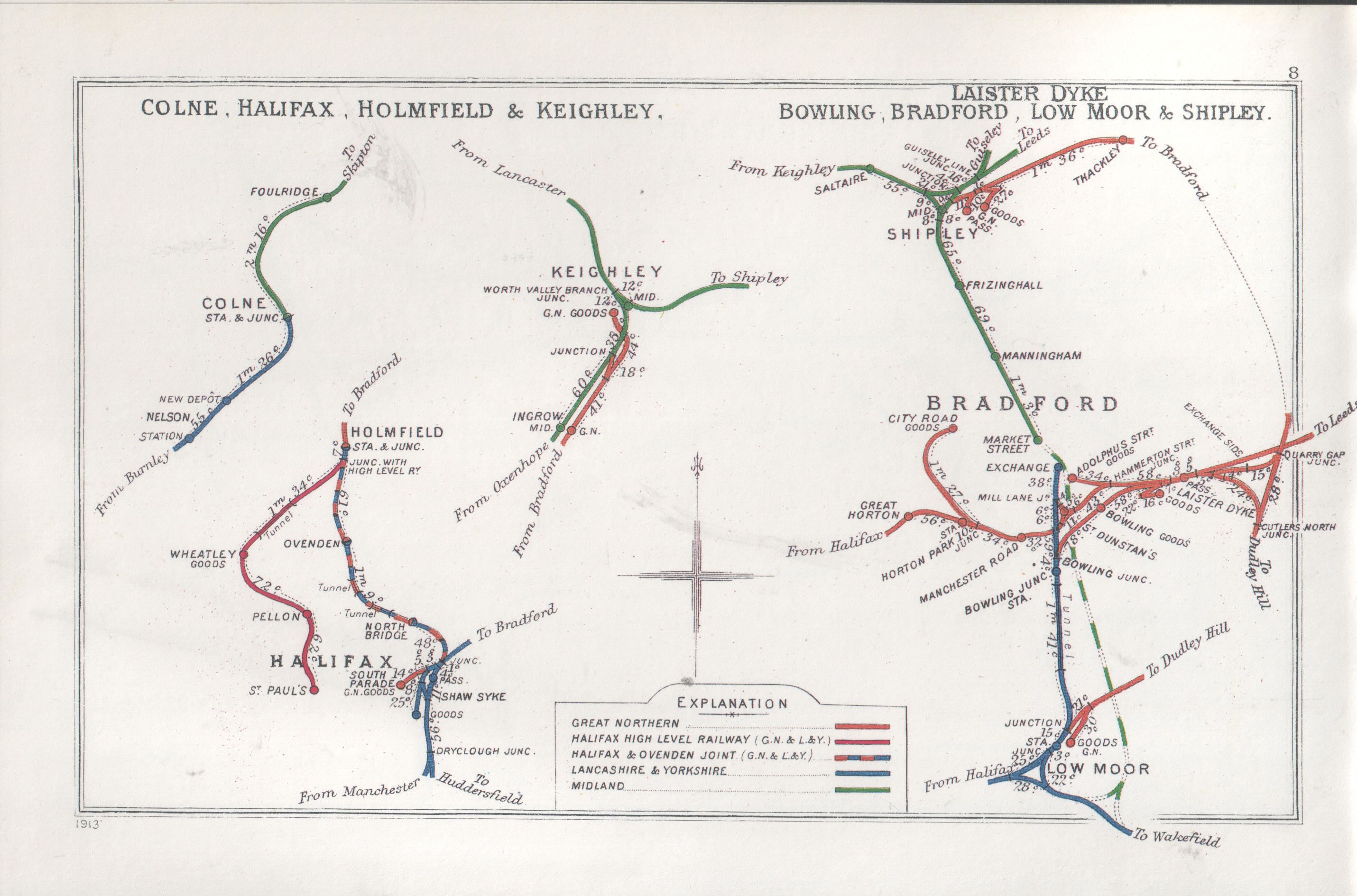
Railway clearing house map showing lines north of Halifax in 1913

A new line was constructed by the Great Northern Railway in the mid-1870s from the main station over a long viaduct to a station at North Bridge, then across and indeed partly in tunnel beneath the hilly terrain north of the town to an unusual triangular station at Queensbury, where the line divided into track for Keighley (and Skipton, Carlisle and Morecambe) to the north-west and Bradford in the east.

Halifax station was redesigned during 1884–85 and completely rebuilt with six through platforms in 1885–86. Part of the new station opened on 25 October 1885 and the remainder on 30 May 1886. The new station had separate accommodation for LYR and GNR trains; the latter being on the west side.

To distinguish it from Halifax St. Paul's and Halifax North Bridge stations, the main station was known from June 1890 as Halifax Old Station. On 30 September 1951, the name was changed again to Halifax Town and, on 12 June 1961, it reverted to Halifax.

The Halifax High Level Railway was a related branch line opened in 1890, leading from Holmfield near Ovenden, on the line to Queensbury, through a half-mile tunnel through the ridge and across the Wheatley Valley on a ten arch viaduct past Samuel Webster's brewery, to Pellon, where there were sizeable goods facilities and then to St Paul's railway station in Queens Road. This branch line gradually fell into disuse, losing its regular passenger service as early as 1917. The last goods train ran in 1960 and the line was then dismantled, leaving the viaduct standing as a reminder of the former freight link.

The Queensbury branch as a whole was closed in stages from 1955 onwards, although many of its engineering features remain. The route has lately been adopted and to an extent brought back into public use and attention by Sustrans as a walking and cycle route. The principal structure on the line, Queensbury Tunnel, was, at its opening, the longest on the GNR system at 2,501 yards (2.287 km). It is currently derelict, partially flooded and impassable, although a campaign is underway to save it for inclusion in the Sustrans route, though funding was refused in 2020.

A campaign, run by the local newspaper the Halifax Evening Courier, was started to get the station refurbished. The paper said that it wanted a station fit "for the 21st century" and that its current state was "disgraceful". Due to the amount of support generated, Network Rail and Northern agreed to do so.

Work began in May 2009 on a £2.5 million refurbishment scheme that has seen the station footbridge and canopies repaired, new glazing and lighting installed and repainting of the structures. The second phase of the refurbishment, covering the platform and the concourse, was completed in November 2010.

In October 2014, plans were submitted to bring platform 3 back into use to create three platforms together with signalling improvements. Network Rail subsequently announced plans to upgrade the eastern portion of the Calder Valley line in 2017, which will see the surviving signal box here closed. Control of the upgraded track layout and new signalling was passed to the York Rail Operating Centre in October 2018.

== Services ==
Eastbound: Monday to Saturdays, there are now five departures per hour to Bradford, of which four continue to Leeds (the ex-Huddersfield service terminates at Bradford). Two of the latter continue beyond Leeds - one to York and the other to Hull (the latter starts here and was introduced at the winter 2019 timetable change). Fewer trains run in the evening.

Westbound: Monday to Saturday daytime, there is a half-hourly service to Manchester Victoria (hourly evenings), one train an hour to Blackpool North and one per hour to Huddersfield via Brighouse. One of the two Manchester trains is a limited stop one (calling only at Hebden Bridge, Todmorden and Rochdale), whilst the other calls at all intermediate stations to Todmorden, then fast to Rochdale & Manchester. The latter runs through to Chester via Warrington Bank Quay. One service per hour from the Leeds direction terminates here. From summer 2025 until January 2027, the Huddersfield service is being rerouted to Dewsbury and then to Leeds, as the station at Huddersfield does not have enough platforms to deal with terminating trains from the east, whilst rebuilding work as part of the TRU project is continuing. This is due to finish in early 2027, when the service will resume. In the meantime, a free shuttle bus to Huddersfield operates from Brighouse.

On Sundays, there is an hourly service to each of Blackpool North and Huddersfield and two per hour to Manchester (with hourly extensions to Chester).

New Northern Rail franchisee Arriva Rail North planned to introduce additional services to Leeds & Manchester in 2019, many of which would run through to either Liverpool Lime Street or Chester. Through services to Manchester Airport were promised once the Ordsall Chord was completed, but capacity issues in the Castlefield Junction area have seen these postponed for the foreseeable future. The Chester service began running at the May 2019 timetable change. Further alterations at the December 2019 change will see the Huddersfield service start/terminate at Bradford, but a new service to Hull via Selby introduced to maintain the frequency for through trains to Leeds and restore through service to stations east of there.

=== London services ===
The station now sees regular services to London King's Cross via Wakefield Kirkgate, Pontefract and Doncaster. In January 2009, Grand Central had their application for train paths to run a Bradford Interchange to London service accepted by the Office of Rail Regulation. Three trains per day initially operated once full approval for the service was granted - these use Class 180 units and started running from 23 May 2010. A fourth service to and from London commenced in December 2013

Preceding station	National Rail	Following station
Sowerby Bridge	Northern; Calder Valley Line	Low Moor
Brighouse	Northern; Calder Valley Line	Low Moor
Brighouse	Grand Central; London-Bradford	Low Moor
	Disused railways	
Copley	Lancashire and Yorkshire Railway	North Bridge
Greetland	Lancashire and Yorkshire Railway	Hipperholme

== See also ==
- Listed buildings in Halifax, West Yorkshire
