= Alfred Page (priest) =

Archdeadon of Leeds

Alfred Charles Page (24 December 1912 – 5 February 1988) was Archdeacon of Leeds from 1969 to 1981.

He was educated at Bungay Grammar School, Corpus Christi College, Cambridge and Wycliffe Hall, Oxford. He was ordained in 1936 After a curacy at Wortley-de-Leeds he was Priest in charge at Quarry Hill. In 1944 he became Vicar of St Mark, Woodhouse. In 1955 he became the Incumbent at Rothwell. He was Rural Dean of Whitkirk until his appointment as Archdeacon. He was also Vicar of Arthington from 1969 to 1973.
