= Lucius Smith =

British bishop (1860–1934)

The Right Reverend Lucius Smith
- Bishop of Knaresborough
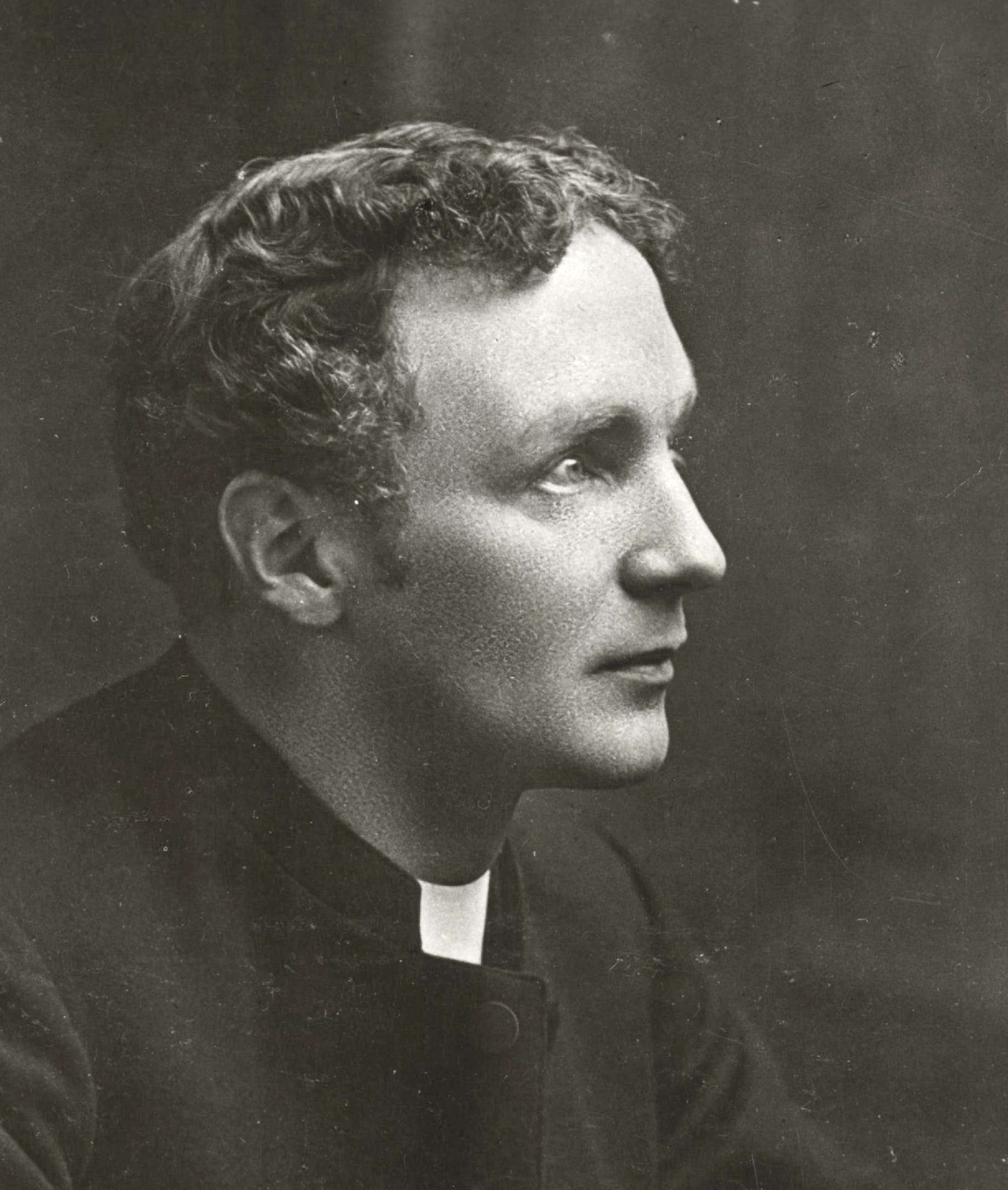
- Lucian Smith, circa 1890
- Church: Anglican
- Province: Province of York
- Diocese: Diocese of Ripon
- Elected: 1905

Personal details
- Born: Lucius Frederick Moses Bottomley Smith; 6 January 1860
- Died: 31 December 1934 (aged 74)
- Education: Harrow School
- Alma mater: Balliol College, Oxford

Lucius Frederick Moses Bottomley Smith (6 January 1860 – 31 December 1934) was the inaugural Bishop of Knaresborough from 1905 to 1934.

== Background ==
Lucius Frederick Smith was born on 6 January 1860 into a clerical family. His father was the Reverend Frederick Smith (1823–1874) of Woodleigh Hall, Rawdon, Vicar of Shelf, West Yorkshire. In the Wharfedale area in 1884, Lucius Smith married Lucy Catherine Gibson Bottomley (1863–1937), daughter of Moses Bottomley (born 1829) JP of Rawdon and Susannah Ingham (born 1840). Smith took on the extra names "Moses Bottomley" at the time of the marriage. They had two sons Bernard Richard Lucius (later Reverend) and Frederick, and three daughters. Bernard was director of music at the Royal Grammar School, Guildford.

In the paternal line, Lucius Smith's grandfather was Joseph Smith (1792–1841) Alderman and Burgess of Doncaster and his great grandfather William Smith (1767–1829) merchant and property owner in Rotherham and Whitehouse near Greasborough. His Uncle Arthur Joseph Smith (1825–1891) was three times Lord Mayor of Doncaster, another uncle William Edwood Smith was twice Lord Mayor of Doncaster and Town Clerk. His cousin Walter Shirley Shirely QC MP (1851–1888) was elected the first Member of Parliament for the Doncaster Division in 1885 – he also attended Harrow and Balliol College, Oxford.

Smith was educated at Harrow and Balliol College, Oxford. At Balliol in 1880 he took second class Classical Honour Moderations, and in 1882 he graduated with Bachelor of Arts. Following Oxford, he studied for a year at Leeds Clergy School, and was ordained deacon and priest at Liverpool in 1883. In 1905 he was made Doctor of Divinity.

== Career ==
Smith accepted a curacy at St Thomas Toxteth Park, 1883–1886. (Note: During which time he married Lucy Bottomley) He was successively curate of St Margaret Ilkley between 1886 and 1890, then took a curacy at Richmond for a year, 1890–1891. In 1891 he became vicar of Easby with Brompton-on-Swale. Between 1892 and 1902 he was vicar of Calverley, and between 1902 and 1906 he was vicar of Macclesfield. He had the Canon Residentiary of Ripon Cathedral from 1905 to 1921. On 27 December 1905 he began his 29-year stint as Suffragan Bishop of Knaresborough. He was also Archdeacon of Ripon during the same period, but his title was changed to Archdeacon of Leeds (1921–1934). His last post from 1921 was rector of Methley, where in those early days of telecommunications his telephone number was Methley 8. He resigned the Methley post around 1933 due to ill health, although he retained the archdeaconry of Leeds.

Smith supported the temperance movement, and organisations for overseas missions. Alongside his ecumenical duties, he was concurrently president of the antiquarian Thoresby Society. He was considered "an authority on architecture and archaeology," and produced various pamphlets and books, including The Story of Ripon Minster, besides religious tracts such as Penitence, Pardon and Progress and When Thou Hast Shut Thy Door.

A thoughtful cleric, devout patriot and historian, Lucius Smith died at Methley rectory on 31 December 1934.

== Published works ==
- Smith, Lucius (1914). The Story of Ripon Minster, A Study in Church History. Leeds: Richard Jackson. (Appendix, index, list of subscribers, frontispiece drawing of Lady Loft by P. Radcliffe-Wilson, 37 photographic plates. 327pp.)

== Notes ==
Church of England titles
| Preceded by Inaugural appointment | Bishop of Knaresborough; 1905 – 1934 | Succeeded by Paul Fulcrand Delacour de Labilliere |
