= Holywell Green =

Village in West Yorkshire, England

Coordinates: 53.675000°N 1.866404°W

Holywell Green (Burnsley)
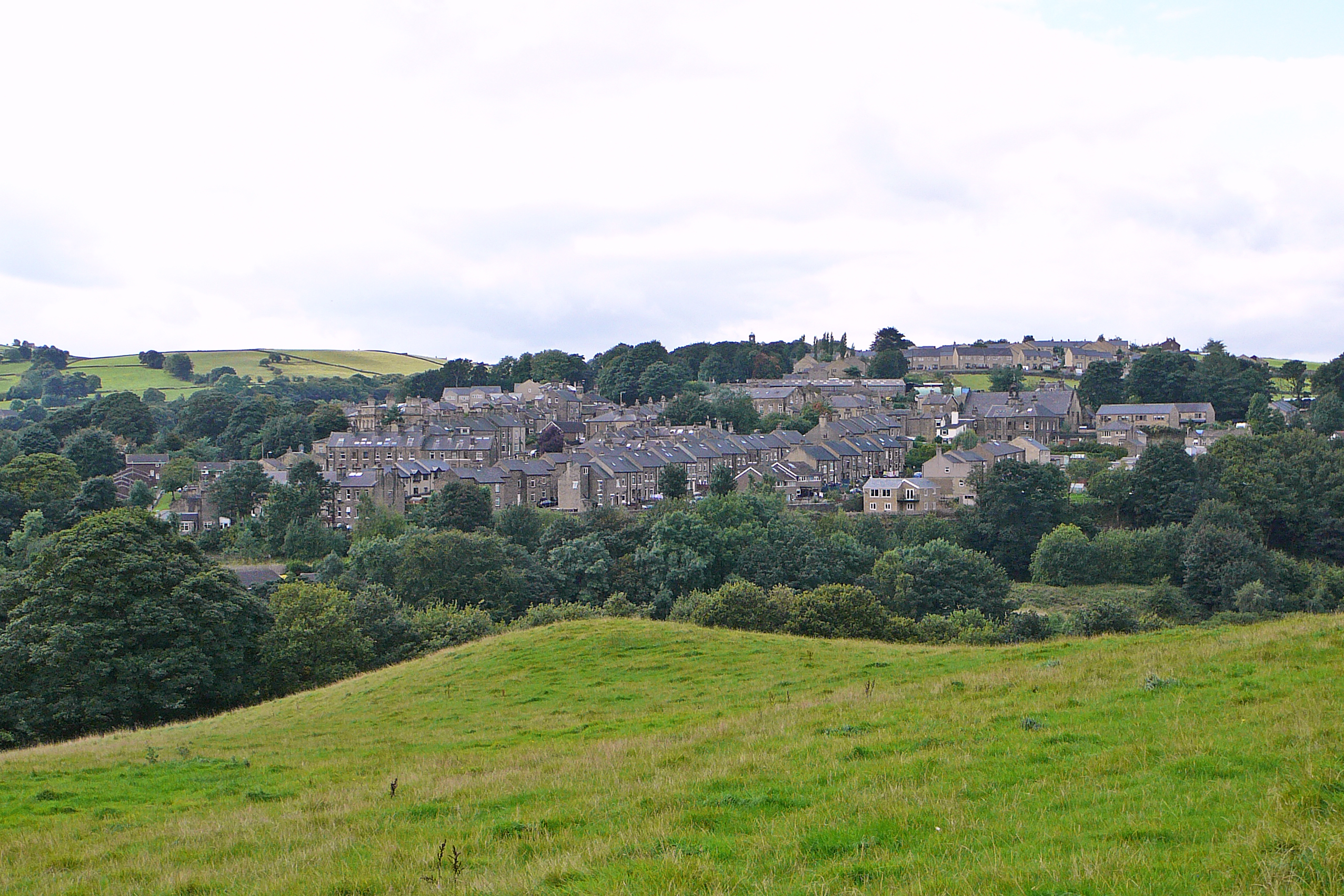
- Holywell Green, from Broad Carr Lane

- Location within West Yorkshire
- Population: 3,178 (2011 Census) (with Stainland)
- OS grid reference: SE089198
  - London: 170 mi (270 km) SE
- Civil parish: Stainland and District
- Metropolitan borough: Calderdale
- Metropolitan county: West Yorkshire
- Region: Yorkshire and the Humber
- Country: England
- Sovereign state: United Kingdom
- Post town: HALIFAX
- Postcode district: HX4
- Dialling code: 01422
- Police: West Yorkshire
- Fire: West Yorkshire
- Ambulance: Yorkshire
- UK Parliament: Calder Valley

Holywell Green is a village in the civil parish of Stainland and District, in the Calderdale district in the county of West Yorkshire, England. The village is situated approximately 1.4 miles (2 km) south-west of Elland, 3.3 miles (5 km) south of Halifax and 3.9 miles (6 km) north-west of Huddersfield. Holywell Green is part of the Greetland and Stainland Ward of Calderdale Council.

== History ==
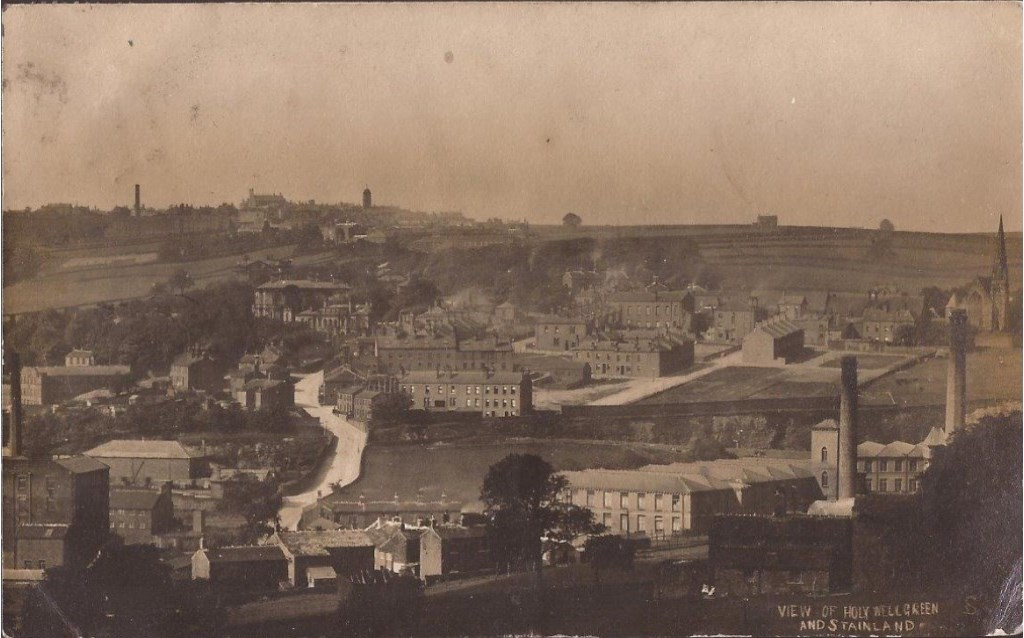

Holywell Green, also known as Burnsley, was recorded in the Domesday Book as being "a small hamlet within the township of Stainland". It derives its name from St Helen's Well, which was known within the area during medieval times. The original location of this well is uncertain. It is famous for the creation of the 'Burnsley Oatcake'; a dense bread roll, finished with oats.

== Geography ==
Holywell Green is the name given to the east side of Stainland. It is based around Stainland Road and Station Road, and built on an east-facing hill. Since West View and Bradley View were built, Stainland and Holywell Green have been conjoined.

== Landmarks ==
=== Shaw Park ===
The park was the garden of Brooklands until the house was demolished in the 1930s. In 1955, Raymond Shaw gave the garden to Elland UDC after which it became a public park. It has a playground, small football field, basketball hoop, well, ornamental lake, wildlife pond, arches and four Grade II listed buildings. The main entrance and car park are located near the top of Station Road. The pedestrian entrances are, Shaw Lane next to Brooklands Avenue, further down Shaw Lane behind Brooklands Close and the very bottom of Shaw Lane.

The Shaw Park Restoration Group was founded in 2010, to restore the park back "to its former glory". Money for restoration has been lacking because of Calderdale Council spending cuts.

The restoration group has since disbanded and since 2020 the Friends of Shaw Park volunteer group have been actively maintaining and improving the park in partnership with Calderdale MBC and Stainland and District Parish Council.

=== St Helen's Well ===
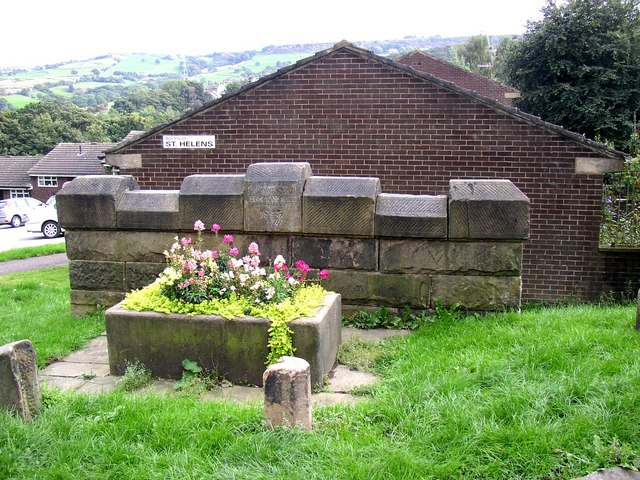
The stone trough on Station Road

St Helen's Well is mentioned in John Watson's History and Antiquities of the Parish of Halifax, 1775. He gives no description but says a Roman Catholic chapel dedicated to St Helen nearby had been converted into a cottage, but in its walls was a large stone known locally as "the Cross". Both the Well and the Cross were sometimes visited by "strangers", who were assumed by the inhabitants to be Catholic pilgrims. Watson also possessed a deed which mentioned a grant made to "Henry de Sacro Fonte de Staynland", dated between 1279 and 1324.

The exact location of the well is uncertain. The traditional site is marked by a stone trough in the village, on Station Road, above which is the inscription "Holy Well Improved 1843". This well is now dry. Its restoration in 1843 may have been connected with a general resurgence of local interest in holy wells that took place around that time, sparked off by the rise of the temperance movement. The Halifax Guardian for September 1842 described crowds gathering around Well Head spa in Halifax, jostling each other in their eagerness to taste the waters, and similar scenes may have occurred around this well. In the late 19th century, the stone trough had cracked and was leaking. It was further restored in 1977.

However, local historian J.A. Heginbottom claims that this stone trough "has no historical basis for its dedication and is purely fanciful". Heginbottom locates the true site of St Helen's Well about one kilometre away, near Helen Hill Farm on Jagger Green Lane. A spring still flows at this spot, filling a Victorian-era stone cistern.

An early 19th-century engraving of the well can be found in The Legendary Lore of the Holy Wells of England by Robert Charles Hope.

=== Carr Hall Castle ===
Carr Hall Castle is at the end of Shaw Lane. It won Channel 5's 2008 TV show I Own Britain's Best Home.

=== Bradley Hall Golf Club ===
Opposite Burrwood Way's junction with Stainland Road is the road to Bradley Hall Golf Club. The clubhouse is named Bradley Hall. The golf course spreads along the side of the hill below Stainland.

Bradley Hall itself was built in the 16th century and was badly damaged by a fire in 1629. Local places were named after the hall, including Bradley Court, Bradley Lane, Bradley Farm and Little Bradley, all in Greetland, and Bradley View in Holywell Green.

=== Public houses and restaurants ===
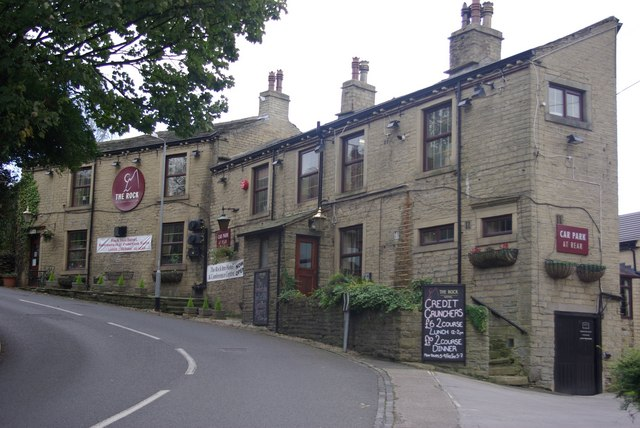
The Rock Hotel

The Rock Hotel, at the bottom of Broad Carr Lane, still has the original Rock Inn at the front of the building, which is now the only public house left in the village.

The Holy Well Inn (previously the Station Hotel, and before that the Waggon and Horses) is at the junction of Stainland Road and Station Road. The inn closed its doors in January 2012, when the owner applied for planning permission to convert it into flats. Local residents successfully campaigned against the plans, and the pub was subsequently listed as an asset of community value. In March 2018, Calderdale Council issued a loan to a local community benefit society, Holywell Community Pub Ltd, allowing them purchase the building. The society intends to re-open the pub and transform it into a "much-needed social hub". The Inn reopened in 2024.

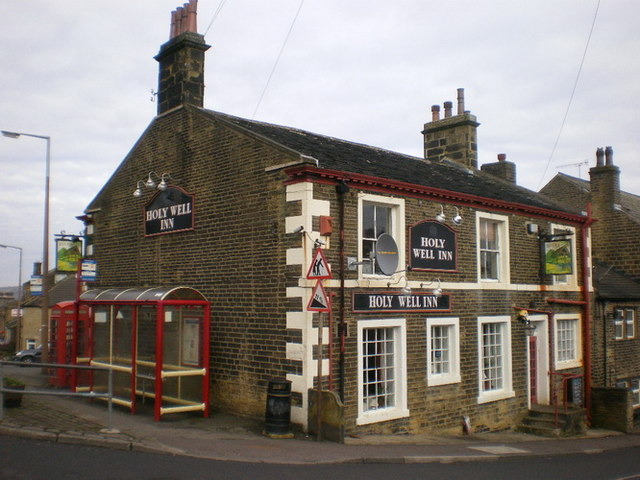
The Holywell Inn

== Religion ==
Located between Chapel Close and Stainland Road is Stainland and Holywell Green United Reformed Church. To the north of the church are recently built houses, and another church stood here until it was demolished in the 1970s.

== Community ==
A Nisa Local shop is at the junction of Stainland Road and Chapel Street. A launderette is next door to the shop. There is a fish and chip shop at the Stainland Road and James Street junction.

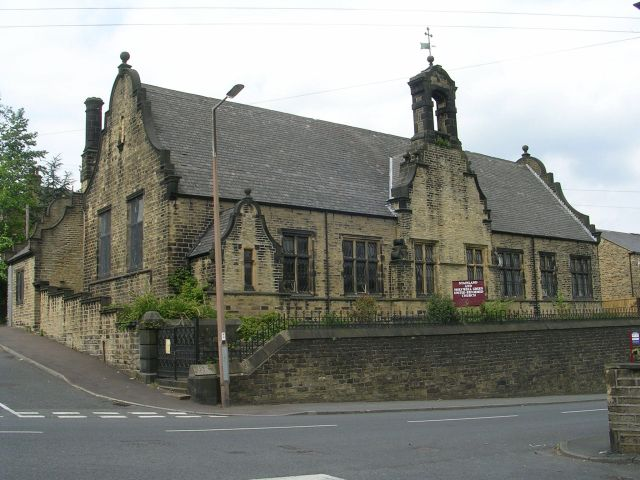
Stainland and Holywell Green United Reformed Church

== Industry ==
Located on Burrwood Way are two industrial parks: Burrwood Industrial Estate and Springwood Business Park.

Below Shaw Park, in the valley, are two chemical plants. One is Stainland Works, accessible via the former route of the train line from Burrwood Way, and Rhodia Chemical Plant which is accessible via Brook Drive. Stainland Works is partly built on the site where Stainland and Holywell Green railway station used to be.

During the 19th century, there was a large amount of industry in the valleys. Stainland Works stands on the site of the previous Brookroyd Mills that employed over 1,200 people in 1857. Many of the houses in the village were built for the mill workers. Approaching Holywell Green from West Vale is Burrwood Mill, now converted into apartments as Burrwood Court.

== Education ==
Holywell Green has one school, Holywell Green Primary School, which educates children between the age of 4 and 11 and also has a nursery. The school was built in 1915 but has had many recent developments that extend it to its current size. The buildings are of both traditional Victorian character and more modern design.

The school is located next to Stainland Road and has views over the nearby deer park and valley.

== See also ==
- Listed buildings in Greetland and Stainland
