= Listed buildings in Greetland and Stainland =

Greetland and Stainland are villages in the metropolitan borough of Calderdale, West Yorkshire, England, and together with the surrounding area form the ward of Greetland and Stainland. The ward contains 144 listed buildings that are recorded in the National Heritage List for England. Of these, four are at Grade II*, the middle of the three grades, and the others are at Grade II, the lowest grade. In addition to the villages of Greetland and Stainland, the ward contains smaller settlements, including Holywell Green, Jagger Green, Norland, Old Lindley, Outlane, Sowood, and West Vale, and the rest of the ward is rural. Most of the listed buildings are houses and associated structures, cottages, laithe houses, farmhouses, and farm buildings, almost all of which are built in stone with stone slate roofs and mullioned windows. The other listed buildings include a stretch of monastic walling, a cross, churches and associated structures, the remains of a set of village stocks, public houses, milestones, former textile mills, boundary stones, a canal milepost, former warehouses, items in Shaw Park, a stone trough on the site of a holy well, a Sunday school, a public hall, two railway viaducts, and a telephone kiosk.

== Key ==
Grade	Criteria
II*	Particularly important buildings of more than special interest
II	Buildings of national importance and special interest

== Buildings ==
Name and location	Photograph	Date	Notes	Grade
Vaccary Walling; 53.70322°N 1.89952°W		12th or 13 century	The wall formed the boundary of a monastic field. It consists of large orthostats and recumbent stones, and extends for just over 100 metres (330 ft) from east to west on the north side of the field.	II
Ellistones Farm Barn, Stainland; 53.67192°N 1.88313°W	—	Medieval	The barn was encased in stone in the 17th century, and has a corrugated iron roof with coped gables and kneelers. The barn is double-aisled, and has opposing square-headed entrances. At the front is a projecting gable containing a doorway with a chamfered surround and a lintel with a depressed Tudor arch, mullioned windows, and a four-tier dovecote in the apex.	II
Stainland Cross; 53.67288°N 1.87760°W		Medieval	The cross stands on three large steps, and has a square shaft tapering to become round. On the top is a block carved on all four sides with St Andrew's cross in relief.	II
Sunny Bank, Greetland; 53.68716°N 1.86884°W		15th century or earlier	The house was mainly rebuilt in about 1550. It is timber framed with a stone slate roof. The house consists of a two-storey hall and parlour, both gabled at the front and rear, a cross-passage between them, and a two-bay two-storey service end, also with two gables. The entrance to the cross-passage is gabled, the doorway is ornate and it has an ogee lintel. Part of the service end is in stone, and contains mullioned windows.	II*
Old Lindley, Farmhouse, and Cottage; 53.66734°N 1.86106°W	—	15th century	A timber framed house, encased in stone in the 17th century, altered in the 18th century, extended in the 19th century, and later divided into three dwellings. It is partly rendered, and has a stone slate roof; the extension has a coped gable and kneelers. The house has two storeys, and consists of a hall range, a projecting cross-wing, a single-storey aisle at the rear, and a three-bay extension to the right. The windows are mullioned.	II
Barn attached to Lower High Trees Cottage, Greetland; 53.68600°N 1.89351°W	—	16th century or earlier	The barn is in stone with a stone slate roof, half-hipped at one end, and with timber framed construction. There are two bays and a double aisle.	II
Lower Moulson Place and barn 53.65028°N 1.89957°W	—	16th century or earlier	The barn is the oldest part, with the house added to the right in the late 18th century. The building is in stone with stone slate roofs. The barn is double-aisled with five bays and quoins, and it contains a central square-headed cart entry with composite jambs. The house has two storeys, a doorway with monolithic jambs, and mullioned windows.	II
Norland Town House and The Cottage; 53.70279°N 1.89548°W	—	Mid 16th century	The house, later divided, has a timber framed core, and was encased in stone in 17th century. It has a stone slate roof that has gables with moulded coping, kneelers, and finial bases. There are two storeys, and the house consists of a hall range, gabled cross-wings, an aisle at the rear, and an added wing to the front. In the hall range is an arched doorway with an ogee-moulded lintel, and the windows are mullioned, or mullioned and transomed, one with nine lights, and some have hood moulds.	II
Bradley Hall Golf Clubhouse, Holywell Green; 53.68010°N 1.87434°W		1577–1604	The remaining part of a manor house that has been extended to form a golf clubhouse, it is in stone with a stone slate roof and two storeys. In the north gable is a two-storey five-sided bay window with an octagonal plan and cross-windows on the front. To the left is a ten-light mullioned and transomed window and a five-light mullioned window above. Over the ground floor windows is a continuous hood mould. In the south gable are two blocked windows with hood moulds and a blocked doorway.	II
Barn west of Stubbing Farmhouse; 53.67990°N 1.88890°W	—	Late 16th or early 17th century	A stone barn with quoins and a stone slate roof. There are four bays and a single aisle. The barn contains a square-headed cart entry with an internal porch, a doorway with a depressed arched lintel, and square-headed chamfered vents.	II
Bank Top Farmhouse, Greetland; 53.69073°N 1.85939°W	—	Early 17th century	The earliest part of the farmhouse now forms a cross-wing, to which a main range was added in the 18th century. The farmhouse is in stone with a stone slate roof and two storeys. The cross-wing has a rendered gable and contains double chamfered mullioned windows with hood moulds. The later range has two bays, quoins, a band, and moulded brackets to the eaves, and it contains sash windows.	II
Binn Royd Farmhouse and Cottage, Norland; 53.70119°N 1.88615°W		Early 17th century	The farmhouse was rebuilt in 1914 and divided into two dwellings. It is in stone and has a stone slate roof with coped gables. There are two storeys, and an H-shaped plan, consisting of a two-bay hall range flanked by gabled cross-wings. The doorways have chamfered surrounds, and the doorway in the hall range has a porch and a datestone. The windows are chamfered and mullioned, some also have transoms, and some have decorative hood moulds.	II
Ellistones Farmhouse, Stainland; 53.67203°N 1.88294°W		Early 17th century	The farmhouse is in stone on a projecting plinth, and has a stone slate roof with coped gables. There are two storeys, and the house consists of a hall range flanked by gabled cross-wings, projecting at the rear. The porch has a cambered entrance, and most of the windows are chamfered and mullioned.	II
Lower Folds Farmhouse and Cottage, Sowood; 53.66170°N 1.88018°W	—	Early 17th century	The building, which was extended in the 19th century, it is in stone, partly rendered, with quoins and a stone slate roof. There are two storeys, a hall range with a gabled cross-wing on the left, a single-storey aisle at the rear, and a later two-storey extension on the right. The doorway has moulded jambs and a depressed Tudor arched head. Most of the windows are mullioned, and the gables have string courses and crocketed finials.	II
Lane Ends, Norland; 53.70369°N 1.90836°W		1628	The farmhouse was extended in the 18th century, and later divided into three dwellings. It is in stone with quoins, and has a stone slate roof with coped gables and kneelers. There are two storeys, and it consists of a two-bay main range, a cross-wing on the right and a rear extension resulting in a double-pile plan. In the main range is a doorway with a moulded surround leading to an internal porch with a chamfered oculus in the right return, a stone bench, and an inner doorway with a chamfered quoined Tudor arch and the date in the lintel. Most of the windows are double-chamfered and mullioned, and some have hood moulds.	II
Crawstone Hall; 53.68671°N 1.89111°W	—	1631	The surviving wing of a house, the rest of which has been demolished. It is in stone with a string course, and a stone slate roof. There are two storeys, and the north front has three gabled bays. The windows on this front are cross windows and at the rear they have been converted into sashes. In the left return is a tall stair window.	II
Lower Old Hall and Cottage; 53.70327°N 1.89646°W		1634	The house is in stone on a chamfered plinth, with a moulded string course, and a stone slate roof that has gables with moulded coping and finials. There are two storeys and a basement, an F-shaped plan, a gabled front of three bays, and a rear kitchen wing. The left bay projects, and on the front is a two-storey porch that has columns with kinked fluting, bases with lozenges, an entablature, and a Tudor arched doorway with a dated and initialled lintel. Above the doorway is a moulded pedestal, a window, and a gabled parapet, and inside the porch are stone benches and an inner Tudor-arched doorway. The windows have double-chamfered mullions and transoms, most with hood moulds. In the rear wing is an ogee-headed doorway, and the basement has a Tudor-arched doorway.	II*
Dean House Farmhouse; 53.65335°N 1.90443°W	—	Early to mid 17th century (probable)	The farmhouse was altered and divided into three dwellings in the 19th century. It is in stone with a stone slate roof. There are two storeys, and it consists of a three-bay hall range, and a gabled cross-wing on the left. There are two doorways, one with a chamfered surround and a Tudor arched head, and the other a later insertion. The windows are a mix; some are mullioned and others are cross windows.	II
Fallingworth Hall and Cottage; 53.70199°N 1.89902°W		Early to mid 17th century	The porch was added in 1642, and there were later alterations including dividing the hall into two dwellings. It is in stone on a chamfered plinth, with a string course. There are two storeys, three bays, and a three-storey rear range. Between the second and third bays is a two-storey porch with a dated Tudor arched head, above which is a window and a gabled parapet with moulded coping and finials. On each return is an oculus, inside the porch are stone benches, and the inner doorway has a chamfered quoined surround and a Tudor arch. The windows are mullioned, and most also have transoms and hood moulds.	II
Upper Wat Ing; 53.70363°N 1.89218°W		1638	The house has an earlier origin, the west wing was added in 1668, and there have been later alterations. It is in stone, and has a stone slate roof with coped gables, shaped kneelers, and finials. There are two storeys and three bays, all of which are gabled at the front and the rear. The doorway has a re-set cusped and dated lintel, and the windows are mullioned, some with hood moulds.	II
Clay House; 53.68938°N 1.85387°W		c. 1650	The house, later used for other purposes, is in stone on a plinth, with a moulded string course, and a stone slate roof. There are two storeys, and a front of four gabled bays with mullioned and transomed windows. Each gable has a stepped attic window, copings, and a finial. On the front are two doorways with shaped architraves, decorated lintels, and cambered hood moulds.	II*
Barn adjoining 3 Spark House Lane, Norland; 53.70391°N 1.90806°W	—	17th century	Most of the barn dates from the 19th century. It is in stone with quoins and a stone slate roof There are three bays and an outshut on the left. In the centre is a quoined segmental-arched cart entry, to its left is a doorway and a window, an above is a small round-arched window with an oculus on each side.	II
Bradley Hall Farmhouse; 53.68368°N 1.86854°W	—	17th century	The farmhouse, which was extended in the 18th century, is in stone with quoins and a stone slate roof. The original part has two storeys and a gabled porch, and there is a parallel wing with three storeys at the rear. At right angles is a later two-storey extension with a single bay. Some windows are mullioned, and others are sashes.	II
Burnall Bank, Holywell Green; 53.67323°N 1.87191°W	—	17th century	A pair of houses with the fronts rebuilt in the 19th century and in 1936. They are in stone, rendered at the rear, and have a stone slate roof. There are two storeys and an outshut at the rear. On the front is a datestone, the windows at the rear are mullioned, some with hood moulds, and in the right return is a doorway with jambs of massive stones.	II
Butterworth End Farmhouse; 53.68907°N 1.92341°W	—	Mid 17th century	The farmhouse was later extended and divided into separate dwellings in the 19th century. It is in stone with quoins, and a stone slate roof with a coped gable and a shaped kneeler. There are two storeys, and an L-shaped plan, with a main range of four bays, two parallel rear wings, and a two-storey porch in the angle with an oculus above the doorway. The arched doorway has a chamfered quoined surround, and above it is a re-set sundial. Some windows have single lights, and most are chamfered and mullioned. In the main range is a doorway with a chamfered quoined surround and a Tudor arch.	II
Clay House Barn; 53.68963°N 1.85348°W		17th century	The barn is in stone with a stone slate roof. There are three or four bays, an aisle on the northeast side, and on the southwest side is a broad full-height gabled projection. This contains a doorway with a depressed arch, a chamfered mullioned window, and six arched vents with spandrels in three tiers. Also on this side is a square-headed cart entry with composite jambs.	II*
Heath Hall Farmhouse; 53.69945°N 1.90065°W	—	Mid 17th century (probable)	A stone house that has a stone slate roof and a coped right gable with a shaped kneeler. There are two storeys, two bays, and a wing on the rear left. The windows are chamfered and mullioned.	II
Holywell Green Farmhouse and barn 53.67455°N 1.86870°W	—	Mid 17th century	The farmhouse and attached barn are in stone with stone slate roofs. The house has two storeys and three bays, a porch with a lean-to roof, a doorway with monolithic jambs, and mullioned windows. The barn to the left has a coped gable with kneelers, a semicircular-arched cart entry with a keystone, doorways with monolithic jambs, and arch-headed vents.	II
Longley Farmhouse; 53.69372°N 1.92642°W	—	17th century	The farmhouse was much altered and extended in the 18th century. It is in stone with quoins and a stone slate roof. There are two storeys and three bays. On the front is a later porch, above which is a dated and initialled plaque. There are two inserted French windows, and the other windows are mullioned.	II
Longley Farmhouse and barn 53.69759°N 1.92155°W	—	Mid 17th century (probable)	The farmhouse was altered and the barn added in the late 18th or early 19th century. The buildings are in stone with quoins and stone slate roofs. The house has two storeys, six bays, and a parallel range and an outshut at the rear. The main doorway has a chamfered quoined surround and a lintel with a stepped soffit, and to the right is a doorway with a plain surround. There is one modern window, and the other windows are mullioned. The barn, at the rear and to the left, has two bays, and contains a round-arched cart entry with imposts and a keystone, a doorway, and a cope gable on the left.	II
Lower Wat Ing; 53.70441°N 1.89038°W	—	Mid 17th century	The farmhouse, later a private house, may contain earlier material, and it was altered in the 18th century. The house is in stone with quoins, and a stone slate roof with shaped coping and kneelers. There are two storeys, a two-bay hall range, a projecting cross-wing on the left, and a rear range. The doorway has a re-set lintel carved with initials and a date, and the windows are mullioned, some with hood moulds.	II
Barn northeast of Lower Wat Ing; 53.70447°N 1.89020°W	—	17th century	The barn, which contains earlier material, is in stone, and has a stone slate roof with coped gables and shaped kneelers. There are five bays and aisles. The openings include a cart entry, two doorways with Tudor arches and one with a basket arch and a datestone above, and round-arched vents.	II
Norland Moor Farmhouse; 53.69816°N 1.89481°W	—	17th century (probable)	The farmhouse, then a private house, was later altered and in the 18th century a barn was added. The buildings are in stone with quoins and stone slate roofs. The house has two storeys, three bays, and a rear outshut. The openings have plain surrounds, and the windows are mullioned. The barn has four bays, opposing round-arched cart entries with tie-stones, windows, a doorway, and vents.	II
Pickwood House, Norland; 53.69989°N 1.89160°W	—	17th century	The house, which was refronted in the 19th century, is in stone with quoins, and a stone slate roof. There are two storeys, a front of three bays, and three gabled wings. The openings have plain surrounds, above the doorway is a fanlight, and the windows are mullioned.	II
Ryburn Golf Club House; 53.69855°N 1.90794°W	—	17th century	A farmhouse that has been considerably altered and converted into a clubhouse, it is stone with quoins and a stone slate roof. There are two storeys, it is built back-to-earth, and has a T-shaped plan consisting of a main range of three bays, and a cross-wing on the right. The doorway has a double-cusped lintel, and the windows are mullioned, some with hood moulds.	II
Sowerby Croft Farmhouse, Sowerby Croft and barn 53.70254°N 1.90722°W	—	17th century	There have been additions and alterations during the following centuries resulting in a farmhouse, a workshop converted into cottages, a barn, and more cottages. They are in stone with quoins, and stone slate roofs with coped gables and shaped kneelers. The farmhouse has two storeys and two bays, and is linked by a rear wing to a parallel former workshop range. Projecting from this is a barn range and a cottage range. The farmhouse has a canted bay window, and an archway linking it to the barn. Most of the windows are mullioned, and in the barn is a round-arched cart entry with moulded imposts and a keystone, and vents.	II
Stainland stocks 53.67217°N 1.88123°W	—	17th century	The stocks consist of two upright stones with inward facing slots, and on each stone are different initials and dates. In front of the stocks is a pair of octagonal piers, and another octagonal pier lies separately.	II
Stubbing Farmhouse; 53.67990°N 1.88890°W	—	17th century	The farmhouse was extended at both ends in the 19th century. It is in stone with a stone slate roof. There are two storeys, a long main range and a single-storey rear kitchen outshut. The windows are mullioned.	II
Upper Butterworth End; 53.68828°N 1.92082°W	—	Mid 17th century	The farmhouse, later a private house, was re-roofed in about 1960. It is in stone with quoins, and has a roof of artificial slate. There are two storeys, three bays, and a rear outshut. The windows are mullioned, and the doorway in the right return has a chamfered surround and a Tudor arched lintel.	II
24 and 26 Rochdale Road, Greetland; 53.68873°N 1.85548°W	—	Late 17th century	A house, later divided into two cottages, it is in stone with quoins and a stone slate roof. There are two storeys, and each cottage has one bay. The doorways have been replaced, and the windows are double chamfered and mullioned.	II
Inglenook, Jagger Green; 53.66980°N 1.86162°W	—	Late 17th century	A stone house with a string course and a stone slate roof with kneelers. There are two storeys, two bays, a rear kitchen wing, and a former single-storey barn to the right that has been incorporated into the house. On the front is a gabled porch, the windows are mullioned, and the former barn, which is rendered, has quoins.	II
Jagger Green Hall; 53.66970°N 1.86114°W	—	Late 17th century	The house, which was extended in the 18th century, is in stone with quoins, a moulded string course, and a stone slate roof with coped gables, kneelers, and finials. The original part has mullioned and transomed windows, including one of 14 lights and another of twelve lights, and in the later parts the windows are sashes. On the front is a doorway with moulded jambs, and in the rear wing is a two-storey gabled porch with a dated and initialled plaque.	II
Lee Farmhouse, Old Lee and barn 53.66135°N 1.86795°W	—	Late 17th century	The barn was probably added to the house in the 18th century. The building is in stone, and has a stone slate roof with a coped gable. The house has quoins, two storeys and four bays. It contains a doorway with monolithic jambs, mullioned windows, and steps leading to a taking-in door in the upper floor. The barn has a segmental-arched cart entry with composite jambs.	II
Barn east of Lower Spark Farmhouse; 53.70621°N 1.90154°W	—	Late 17th century	A stone barn with a stone slate roof, four bays, and an outshut on the right bay. On the front is a cambered-arched cart entry with a quoined and chamfered surround, voussoirs, and springers, and at the rear is a lower cart entry.	II
Barn and cowhouse east of Norland Hall; 53.70583°N 1.89516°W	—	Late 17th century (probable)	The barn is the earlier, with the cowhouse added in the 18th century. They are in stone with quoins and stone slate roofs. The barn has a segmental arched cart entry, and both parts have doorways and vents; many of the openings have quoined surrounds.	II
Old Bank End Farmhouse; 53.68580°N 1.89710°W		Late 17th century	A stone house with quoins, and a stone slate roof. There are two storeys, and a front with two gabled bays. All the windows have double chamfered mullions.	II
Tinker Hey Farmhouse; 53.69777°N 1.88278°W	—	Late 17th century	The farmhouse is in stone with quoins, a moulded string course, and a stone slate roof. There are two storeys, two bays, a lean-to outshut on the front, and an 18th-century rear wing and added cottage. On the front is an inserted doorway, and the windows are mullioned.	II
1–5 Goose Nest Lane, Norland; 53.69962°N 1.91704°W	—	1677	This consists of a farmhouse, later divided into three dwellings, and a cottage added in the 18th century. The building is in stone with stone slate roofs. The farmhouse has two storeys, three bays, and a wing and an outshut at the rear. Each bay contains a doorway, and the windows are mullioned with a continuous hood mould over the ground floor windows. The cottage projects on the right, it is gabled with three bays, and contains quoins, two doorways and mullioned windows.	II
Lower Spark House Farmhouse; 53.70616°N 1.90182°W		1677	The house was altered in the 19th century, it was extended to the rear in about 1980, and has been divided into three dwellings. It is in stone with a rendered front, quoins, and a stone slate roof. There are two storeys, a two-bay main range and a gabled cross-wing on the left, and a rear wing with an outshut. The doorway has a chamfered quoined surround and a dated lintel with a round-cornered soffit. The windows have double-chamfered mullions, many with decorative hood moulds, and in the cross-wing the upper floor window has three lights over five.	II
High Trees Hall and High Trees; 53.68631°N 1.89306°W	—	c. 1678	A house in two occupations, it is in stone on a plinth, with a string course, and a stone slate roof. There are two storeys and a front of two gabled bays. On the front are double chamfered mullioned windows with eight lights on the ground floor, and similar windows with transoms and twelve lights in the upper floor. The main doorway in the left return has moulded jambs, imposts, and a dated and initialled Tudor arched head.	II
Middle Harper Royd Farmhouse and Cottages; 53.70031°N 1.91038°W	—	1687	Two cottages were added to the farmhouse in the late 18th or early 19th century. The buildings are in stone with quoins and stone slate roofs, and have two storeys. The house has four bays, the right bay a separate dwelling, and at the rear is a wing and an outshut. One doorway has an arched head, a moulded and quoined surround and a dated lintel, and the other doorways have plain surrounds. Most of the windows are mullioned, and some have hood moulds.	II
Norland Hall; 53.70588°N 1.89547°W	—	1690	A stone house, partly rendered, on a plinth, with quoins, and a stone slate roof with coped gables, kneelers, and ball finials. There are two storeys and two gabled bays. On the garden front is a two-storey gabled porch that has a doorway with a moulded surround, and a lintel with a round-cornered soffit. Above the doorway is a window and a date plaque, and in the left return is an oculus. Inside the porch are stone benches, and an inner doorway with a moulded surround and a Tudor arched head. The windows have mullions or transoms, and some have hood moulds.	II
Scholes Farmhouse and Cottages; 53.69379°N 1.86869°W	—	1694	A farmhouse, later divided into three dwellings, it is in stone, and has a stone slate roof with coped gables and kneelers. There are two storeys, a main range of three bays, a cross-wing and a back wing at the end, and a continuous rear aisle. On the front, to the left is a depressed arched opening, in the centre is a porch with chamfered jambs and a datestone, and the windows are mullioned.	II
Gate piers, Crawstone Hall; 53.68683°N 1.89109°W	—	c. 1700	The gate piers in front of the hall are in stone. Each pier consists of alternate chamfered blocks surmounted by a pulvinated frieze, a cornice, and a ball finial.	II
The Manor House, Stainland; 53.67266°N 1.88004°W	—	1703	The house, which has been altered, is in stone with quoins, and a stone slate roof with coped gables and a ball finial. There are two storeys and three bays. The middle bay is gabled, and contains a projecting gabled porch with paired doorways that have monolithic jambs. The windows are sashes, some of which are mullioned.	II
Rose and Crown Inn, Greetland; 53.68883°N 1.86270°W		c. 1725	The public house is in stone, partly rendered, with quoins and a stone slate roof. There are two storeys on a sloping site, and four bays. Bow windows have been inserted into the ground floor of the left two bays, and the doors and windows have plain surrounds.	II
Barn attached to 1 Haughcroft Head, Greetland; 53.68801°N 1.87501°W	—	Late 17th or early 18th century	The barn is in stone with quoins, and a stone slate roof with coped gables and kneelers. It has a single aisle and contains a tall square-headed cart entry.	II
Higher New Yard; 53.66840°N 1.89153°W	—	Late 17th or early 18th century	The oldest part is the cross-wing, with the main range added in the 19th century. The house is in stone with quoins and a stone slate roof. There are two storeys, a near-central doorway with monolithic jambs, and mullioned windows.	II
Barn on west side of The Stannary, Stainland; 53.67276°N 1.87927°W	—	Late 17th or early 18th century	The barn, later converted for other uses, is in stone with a stone slate roof. It contains a square-headed cart entry and there is an adjacent outshut.	II
182 Rochdale Road, Greetland; 53.68833°N 1.86751°W	—	Early 18th century	A stone house, partly rendered, with a stone slate roof. There are two storeys, an L-shaped plan, and a rear aisle with a catslide roof. In the gable end is a chamfered mullioned window.	II
3 Stainland Road, Holywell Green; 53.67461°N 1.86869°W	—	Early 18th century	The house is in stone with a stone slate roof. There are two storeys and two bays. The doorway has a large lintel, some windows are sashes, and others are mullioned.	II
5 and 6 Stainland Road, Stainland; 53.67247°N 1.88086°W	—	Early 18th century	Formerly a house and shop, the building is in stone with quoins, a storey band, and a stone slate roof with a coped gable and kneelers. There are two storeys and two bays, and the windows are mullioned.	II
Cross Farm House and barn, Stainland; 53.67263°N 1.87800°W	—	Early 18th century	A laithe house in stone with stone slate roofs. There are two storeys, it is in three parts with different roof heights, and contains doorways and mullioned windows. The tallest part to the west has quoins, a band, coped gables with moulded kneelers, a doorway with monolithic jambs, and at the rear is an arched cart entry with a rusticated keystone that has been converted into a porch.	II
Haughcroft Head, Greetland; 53.68813°N 1.87490°W	—	Early 18th century	A stone house that has a stone slate roof with coped gables and kneelers. There are two storeys, six bays, and an outshut on the east side. The doorway in the right bay has a chamfered surround, and a dated and initialled lintel. Some windows are mullioned, others have had the mullions removed. Over the ground floor is a continuous hood mould that rises in a gable shape over the doorway.	II
Barn to rear of Inglenook; 53.66997°N 1.86142°W	—	Early 18th century	A stone barn that has a stone slate roof with a coped gable, and three bays. There are two entries on one front, one has a semicircular arch rising from imposts, and the other is square-headed with composite jambs.	II
Brian Royd Hall, Greetland; 53.68745°N 1.88061°W	—	Early to mid 18th century	A large stone house with moulded string courses, and a two-span stone slate roof with coped gables and moulded kneelers. There are three storeys and an attic, a double-pile plan, a main range with a front of three bays, and a gabled cross-wing at the left. The windows are mullioned, and in the gable of the cross-wing is an attic window. On the front is an openwork porch with cusped bargeboards and a slate roof. At the rear are two storeys, a central wrought iron porch, sash windows, and a tall stair window.	II
Barn east of Pickwood House; 53.69996°N 1.89141°W	—	Early to mid 18th century	The barn, which incorporates a cottage, is in stone with stone slate roofs, two storeys, and four bays. On the front is a chamfered cart entry with a pointed arch, at the rear the cart entry has a quoined surround and a chamfered cambered timber lintel, and elsewhere are round-arched and rectangular vents, doorways, and windows, one of which is mullioned.	II
Graveyard Wall and railings, St Andrew's Church; 53.67289°N 1.87793°W	—	c. 1740–50	The stone coped wall encloses the graveyard to the south and east. On the walls are cast iron railings with floral heads.	II
Bull and Dog Public House, Stainland; 53.67069°N 1.88399°W		18th century	The public house is in stone with quoins, and a stone slate roof with coped gables and kneelers. There are three storeys, a front of three bays, and a rear outshut. The doorways and windows have plain surrounds, most of the windows are mullioned, and there are single-light windows.	II
Carr Farmhouse, Jagger Green; 53.66990°N 1.86192°W	—	18th century	A pair of cottages, later combined into one dwelling, it is in stone with quoins and a stone slate roof. There are two storeys, and two bays. Each part has a gabled porch with a large lintel, and mullioned windows.	II
Milestone by churchyard wall, Norland; 53.69968°N 1.90132°W		18th century	The milestone by the churchyard wall consists of a square pillar about 1.5 metres (4 ft 11 in) high with a pyramidal top. It is inscribed with the distances to Ripponden, "Ealand" (Elland), Halifax, and "Sowerby" (Sowerby Bridge).	II
Rob Royd and barn 53.67405°N 1.89391°W	—	Mid 18th century	The barn was added to the house later. The buildings are in stone, partly rendered, with quoins, and stone slate roofs with coped gables and kneelers. The house has two storeys, two bays, and a single-storey wing at the rear with a hipped roof, giving an L-shaped plan. The windows in the house are mullioned. The barn has three bays, a segmental-arched cart entry with composite jambs, doorways with monolithic jambs, a lunette in each bay, and in the middle bay is a pedimented gable with a Venetian window.	II
Rough Hey Farmhouse; 53.69640°N 1.91359°W	—	Mid 18th century (probable)	The farmhouse, attached barn and cottage have been combined into one dwelling, which is in stone with a stone slate roof. The house has quoins, two storeys and two bays, the barn has three bays, and the cottage has two storeys and two bays. The openings have plain surrounds, and the windows are mullioned. In the barn is a central cart entry with a monolithic lintel.	II
Gazebo and garden wall, Sowerby Croft; 53.70304°N 1.90720°W	—	Mid 18th century (probable)	The wall, which has brick lining, encloses a square garden with the gazebo at the northwest corner. The gazebo is in stone with quoins and a pyramidal stone slate roof. There are two storeys and one bay, and the openings have plain surrounds. On the left side a lean-to covers a cantilevered staircase leading to an upper floor doorway.	II
St Andrew's Church, Stainland; 53.67304°N 1.87791°W		1754–55	Originally an Independent chapel, it became an Anglican church in 1840 and was extended at that time. The tower was added in 1860, and the chancel and wings to the tower in 1887–88. The church is built in stone with a stone slate roof. It consists of a nave, a chancel, and a tower containing a porch with single-storey wings. The tower has a belfry stage, over which is a stage with clock faces, and a cupola with a dome. The doorway in the tower porch and the windows along the sides of the church have round-arched heads.	II
Well Royd, Stainland; 53.67048°N 1.88656°W	—	1762	A stone house with quoins, a band, and a two-span stone slate roof with coped gables and kneelers. There are two storeys, a double-pile plan, and a symmetrical two-bay front. In the centre is a doorway, above which is an initialled and dated plaque, and the windows are mullioned. The rear is rendered, and contains a mullioned and transomed stair window.	II
11 Haigh Street, Greetland; 53.68810°N 1.87137°W	—	Late 18th century	A stone house with quoins and a stone slate roof. There are two storeys and one bay. To the right is a doorway with a tie-stone, and there is a four-light mullioned window in each floor.	II
48 and 50 Martin Green Lane, Greetland; 53.68703°N 1.87768°W	—	Late 18th century	A pair of weavers' houses, they are in stone with a stone slate roof. There are three storeys, and paired central doorways sharing a common jamb between them. The windows are mullioned, the top floor was originally probably a weaving loft, and at the rear is a blocked taking-in door.	II
48 and 50 Rochdale Road, Greetland; 53.68914°N 1.85917°W	—	Late 18th century	A pair of stone cottages with moulded gutter brackets and a stone slate roof. There are two storeys and each cottage has two bays. The paired central doorway have tie-stone jambs, and the windows are mullioned.	II
1 and 2 Sowood Fold, Sowood; 53.66068°N 1.88091°W	—	Late 18th century	A pair of mirror-image cottages in stone with a stone slate roof. There are two storeys, and each cottage has a doorway with monolithic jambs, a single-light window and two mullioned windows.	II
3 and 4 Sowood Fold, Sowood; 53.66077°N 1.88074°W	—	Late 18th century	A pair of stone cottages with a stone slate roof. There are two storeys, and each cottage has a doorway with monolithic jambs, and mullioned windows.	II
5 and 6 Sowood Fold, Sowood; 53.66086°N 1.88053°W	—	Late 18th century	A pair of mirror-image cottages in stone with a stone slate roof. There are two storeys and a gabled front containing doorways with monolithic jambs, and mullioned windows.	II
16–18 Sowood Green, Sowood; 53.66319°N 1.88176°W	—	Late 18th century	A row of three stone cottages with a stone slate roof. There are two storeys, and each cottage has one bay and a doorway with monolithic jambs. There are two single-light windows and the other windows are mullioned.	II
Dean House and two barns 53.65364°N 1.90552°W	—	Late 18th century	This consists of two cottages with a later barn attached to the left, and another barn at the rear. They are in stone with stone slate roofs and have a coped gable. The cottages have two storeys, mullioned windows, and a doorway with monolithic jambs. The barn to the left has a tall semicircular-arched cart entry with a keystone and a doorway with monolithic jambs. The barn at the rear is at right angles, and contains a similar cart entry and a square-headed cart entry.	II
Barn to Dene Royd, Stainland; 53.67086°N 1.88497°W	—	Late 18th century	A barn and cottages in stone with a stone slate roof. In the west front are two segmental-arched doorways, and the east front contains a recessed central porch, square-headed entries, and mullioned windows.	II
Dog and Partridge Public House; 53.66030°N 1.88700°W		Late 18th century	The public house is in stone with quoins, and a stone slate roof with coped gables and kneelers. In the centre is a 20th-century porch, and the windows are mullioned.	II
Holly Tree Farmhouse and barn 53.66936°N 1.86366°W	—	Late 18th century	A laithe house in stone with a stone slate roof, it originally consisted of two cottages and a barn to the right. One of the cottage doorways has been converted into a windows, and the other windows are mullioned. The barn has a three-centred arched opening and a mullioned window.	II
Barn attached to Longley Farmhouse; 53.69381°N 1.92653°W	—	Late 18th century (probable)	The barn with workrooms, later used for other purposes, is in stone with quoins and a stone slate roof. There are two storeys and a loft, and five bays. In the centre is a round-arched cart entry above which is a window and a gablet containing pigeon holes with ledges. The outer bays contain doorways and windows with plain surrounds, and at the rear is a taking-in door.	II
Lower Ellistones; 53.68571°N 1.87445°W	—	Late 18th century	A pair of stone cottages with a stone slate roof and two storeys. Each cottage has a doorway with tie-stone jambs, and mullioned windows.	II
Lower Ellistones Mill; 53.68569°N 1.87420°W	—	Late 18th century	A former woolen mill, it is in stone with quoins, a stone slate roof, and three storeys. The ground floor has been altered, and in the upper floors are mullioned windows. On the left side, stone steps lead up to a doorway with a taking-in door above.	II
Lower Park, Sowood; 53.66088°N 1.88666°W	—	Late 18th century	A pair of cottages with a barn added in the 19th century. They are in stone with a stone slate roof and the cottages have two storeys. Each cottage has a doorway with tie-stone jambs, the windows are mullioned and there is a date plaque, possibly re-set. In the barn are opposing elliptical-arched cart entries with imposts.	II
Shepherd's Cottage, Stainland; 53.67046°N 1.88669°W	—	Late 18th century	A stone house with quoins, a projecting band, and a stone slate roof with coped gables and kneelers. There are two storeys, a double-pile plan, and a single bay on the front. The doorway to the right has monolithic jambs, and the windows are mullioned.	II
New Longley and outhouse range 53.69477°N 1.92063°W		1797	A terrace of 16 weavers' cottages with a range of outhouses on the left. They are in stone with stone slate roofs, and the cottages form an L-shaped plan. The cottages have two or three storeys, the outbuildings have one storey, and each cottage has one bay. The openings have plain surrounds, most windows are mullioned, there is a blocked taking-in door, and on the front is a dated plaque.	II
Greenhead and barn 53.70132°N 1.89264°W	—	c. 1800	A row of three cottages, combined into one dwelling and an attached barn, they are in stone with quoins and stone slate roofs. The cottages have two storeys and three bays, and the barn to the rear right also has three bays. The cottages contain doorways and mullioned windows. In the front of the barn is a central cart entry, a window and a doorway, and at the rear is an elliptical-headed cart entry; both cart entries have imposts and keystones.	II
Boundary Stone, Norland Road; 53.68242°N 1.86369°W		Late 18th to early 19th century	The boundary stone marks the boundary between the parishes of Sowerby Bridge and Elland. It consists of a rectangular stone post set into the parapet of a bridge, it carries a weathered inscription and a benchmark.	II
Canal milepost 53.69265°N 1.85082°W		Late 18th to early 19th century	The milepost is by the towpath of the Calder and Hebble Navigation. It consists of a stone with a rounded top and chamfered edges that is inscribed with the distance to Fall Ings.	II
Daisy Lee, Outlane; 53.65596°N 1.87751°W	—	Late 18th to early 19th century	A row of three stone cottages with a stone slate roof and two storeys. Each cottage has a doorway with monolithic jambs and the windows are mullioned; in the ground floor there is one window with four lights, and in the upper floor there are two with three lights each.	II
Holroyd Square, Stainland; 53.67255°N 1.88073°W	—	Late 18th to early 19th century	A row of four stone cottages with a stone slate roof. They have two storeys, the doorways are paired, and each cottage has mullioned windows, some of which have been replaced.	II
Milestone near Moor Quarries, Greetland; 53.68814°N 1.89594°W		Late 18th to early 19th century	The milestone is on the south side of Rochdale Road (B6113 road). It consists of an upright whitewashed stone with a triangular plan. The milestone is inscribed with the distances to Rochdale, Ripponden, and Elland.	II
Providence United Reformed Church, Stainland; 53.67017°N 1.89020°W		1814	The church is in stone, and has a front of two storeys and a basement, and sides of three storeys. The entrance front has three bays, a plinth, bands, and a pedimented gable containing a dated plaque. The doorway has pilasters and an entablature with the cornice raised as a pediment, and in the upper storey are lunettes. On the sides, the ground and middle floor have square-headed openings, and in the top floor the windows have round heads.	II
Wall, gates and steps, Providence United Reformed Church; 53.67006°N 1.88979°W		c. 1814	The triangular burial ground is enclosed by dry stone walls. The entrance to the burial ground is at the apex of the triangle, and is flanked by stone gate piers with a wrought iron overthrow. At the other end, leading to the entrance to the church, are right-angled-steps with retaining wrought iron railings.	II
North Dean Cottage; 53.69037°N 1.85518°W	—	1819	A stone cottage that has a stone slate roof with coped gables and kneelers. There is one storey and a symmetrical front of three bays. The middle bay projects, and contains a doorway above which is an inscribed and dated plaque and a pedimented gable. The outer bays contain sash windows.	II
1–3 Moor Hey, Sowood; 53.66442°N 1.88229°W	—	Early 19th century	Three cottages at the end of a row, they are in stone and have a stone slate roof with a coped gable. There are two storeys, and each cottage has a doorway with monolithic jambs, and mullioned windows.	II
4 and 5 Moor Hey, Sowood; 53.66448°N 1.88210°W	—	Early 19th century	Two cottages in a row of cottages, they are in stone with a stone slate roof. There are two storeys, and each cottage has a doorway with monolithic jambs, and mullioned windows. No 5 has a 20th-century porch.	II
6 and 7 Moor Hey, Sowood; 53.66453°N 1.88198°W	—	Early 19th century	Two cottages in a row of cottages, they are in stone with a stone slate roof. There are two storeys, and each cottage has a doorway with monolithic jambs. One cottage has a single-light window, and the other windows are mullioned.	II
8 Moor Hey, Sowood; 53.66455°N 1.88188°W	—	Early 19th century	A cottage in a row of cottages, it is in stone with a stone slate roof. There are two storeys and two bays. The central doorway has monolithic jambs, above it is a single-light window, and the other windows have three lights and are mullioned. Below the gutter brackets is a string course.	II
9 Moor Hey, Sowood; 53.66459°N 1.88175°W	—	Early 19th century	A cottage at the end of a row of cottages, it is in stone with a stone slate roof. There are two storeys, and the cottage projects from the rest of the row. The doorway has monolithic jambs, and the windows are mullioned.	II
976 and 978 New Hey Road, Outlane; 53.65392°N 1.88046°W	—	Early 19th century	A laithe house in stone with a stone slate roof. The house to the left has two storeys, two doorways and mullioned windows, and the barn contains a segmental-arched cart entry and a doorway.	II
Barn northeast of Beestonley Farmhouse; 53.67556°N 1.89509°W	—	Early 19th century	A barn and warehouse with a weaving shop in the top floor, it is in stone and has a stone slate roof with coped gables. There are three storeys and three bays. In the centre is a round-headed cart entry with a doorway to the left. The middle floor contains square windows, and in the top floor is a window with 14 lights, four of which are blocked. In the left return is a taking-in door converted into a window.	II
Bents Farmhouse and barn 53.69458°N 1.91801°W	—	Early 19th century	A laithe house with a barn added later, the building is in stone with a stone slate roof. There are two storeys, and the laithe consists of a single-bay house, with a three-bay barn to the right and a cottage at the rear of the right bay, the later barn is to the left and has three bays. The openings have plain surrounds, the windows have mullions, the original barn has a segmental-arched cart entry with imposts and a keystone, and in the later barn is a cart entry with a round arch and a keystone.	II
Kilncroft, Stainland; 53.67131°N 1.88401°W	—	Early 19th century	A row of three stone cottages with stone slate roofs. Two cottages have two storeys and the other cottage has one. Each cottage has a doorway and mullioned windows, and the two-storey cottages also have single-light windows.	II
Laneside, Stainland; 53.67390°N 1.87198°W	—	Early 19th century	Three stone cottages within a terrace, with a stone slate roof and two storeys. Each cottage has a doorway with monolithic jambs, a single-light window, and a mullioned window in each floor.	II
Longley Cottage; 53.69381°N 1.92624°W	—	Early 19th century	A pair of cottages combined into one dwelling, with an earlier building attached to the right. It is in stone with quoins and a stone slate roof. There are two storeys, two bays, and the earlier building is lower, with two storeys and one bay. The windows are mullioned, the doorway has a plain surround, and the gable of the earlier building has a shaped kneeler.	II
Moor Bottom Farmhouse and barn 53.69152°N 1.87808°W	—	Early 19th century	A laithe house consisting of two cottages and a barn at right angles forming a T-shaped plan. They are in stone with stone slate roofs. The cottages have two storeys and each cottage has a doorway with monolithic jambs and mullioned windows. The barn has a catslide roof, and contains a segmental-arched cart entry with composite jambs and impost blocks, and above it are three pigeon holes.	II
Moorview and Sandymoor, Jagger Green; 53.66980°N 1.86227°W	—	Early 19th century	A cottage, divided into two dwellings, it is in rendered stone, and has a stone slate roof with a coped gable at one end. There are two storeys, four bays, and a single-storey rear outshut. One the sides are porches, and the windows are mullioned.	II
New Laithe, Sowood Green; 53.66581°N 1.88060°W	—	Early 19th century	A laithe house with a cottage added later, it is in stone with a stone slate roof. The cottages have two storeys, and at the rear is a single-storey outshut. The doorway of the original cottage has monolithic jambs, to the right the barn has a segmental-arched doorway, and further to the right is another cottage, slightly projecting, with a catslide roof. In all parts there are mullioned windows.	II
Warehouse, The Stannary, Stainland; 53.67300°N 1.87900°W	—	Early 19th century	The warehouse is in stone and has a hipped stone slate roof. There are two storeys and four bays. The windows are mullioned, and in the upper floor is a taking-in door with monolithic jambs.	II
Springfield and Springfield Cottage, Outlane; 53.65706°N 1.87795°W	—	Early 19th century	A pair of cottages in stone, partly rendered, with a two-span stone slate roof. There are two storeys, and each cottage has two bays. In the centre of each cottage is a doorway with monolithic jambs, the windows are mullioned, and in the right gable end is a blocked taking-in door.	II
Well Head and Well Head Cottage, Stainland; 53.67243°N 1.88103°W	—	Early 19th century	A pair of cottages, one of which was once a shop, in stone with quoins and a stone slate roof. There are two storeys and three bays. The doorways have monolithic jambs and the windows are mullioned. The left gable end is rendered and contains a two-light arch-headed window.	II
Wilderness Farm, cottages and barn 53.65481°N 1.88060°W	—	Early 19th century	A laithe house in stone that has a stone slate roof with coped gables. The two cottages have two storeys, and contain paired doorways and mullioned windows. In the barn is a segmental-arched cart entry.	II
92 Saddleworth Road, West Vale; 53.68671°N 1.85729°W		1836	The former warehouse is stone with a hipped slate roof. There are three storeys and five bays. The ground floor has been altered. In the upper floors, there is a taking-in door in the middle bay in both floors, with a pediment above containing a dated plaque, and the outer bays contain windows with plain surrounds.	II
Town Ing Mill, Stainland; 53.67175°N 1.88031°W	—	1841	The mill is in stone, and has a stone slate roof with a coped gable and kneelers. There are three storeys and sides of five and three bays. The windows are sashes, in the gable end is a Venetian window, and on the apex is a decorative wrought iron weathervane.	II
The Holywell, Holywell Green; 53.67425°N 1.86576°W		1843	This consists of a stone trough commemorating an earlier holy well. Behind it is a stone wall with heavy coping, an inscription, and the date, and in front of the trough are two stone posts.	II
2 Stainland Road, Holywell Green; 53.67455°N 1.86858°W	—	Mid 19th century	A stone house that has a stone slate roof with a coped gable and kneelers. There are two storeys, a double-pile plan, and one bay. On the front are two mullioned sash windows, and in the right return is a re-used doorway with chamfered jambs, a three-centred arched head, spandrels, and a dated lintel.	II
Barn west of Butterworth End Farmhouse; 53.68906°N 1.92372°W	—	Mid 19th century	The barn is in stone with a stone slate roof and three bays. It contains an arched cart entry with a Venetian window above, and doorways at the ends.	II
Boundary Marker on Jagger Bridge; 53.68242°N 1.86369°W		Mid 19th century	The stone marks the boundary between the townships of Stainland and Greetland. It is an upright stone slab with an arched head and is inscribed with the names of the townships and pointing hands.	II
Castle Farmhouse, Holywell Green; 53.66693°N 1.87083°W		Mid 19th century	The building is in the form of a Gothic castle, and includes a farmhouse, a gatehouse, and a stable block. It is in stone with a string course and a stone slate roof. The main block has two storeys and four bays, and contains arched windows. To its right is a square three-storey tower with an embattled parapet, to the left is a three-storey turret and a five-storey tower, both with lancet windows. Further to the left is the entrance to the courtyard over which is a three-storey embattled tower with lancets and machicolation. Beyond this is the stable range with rusticated battlements, and arched doorways and windows. At the end is another embattled tower with machicolation. At the rear is a courtyard with outbuildings.	II
Gatehouse to Shaw Park; 53.67302°N 1.86850°W		Mid 19th century	The gatehouse is in stone and is embattled. It consists of a segmental pointed arch that is flanked by turrets, both with false machicolations. The turrets contain stepped lancet windows and cruciform arrow slits, and the doors are studded and have ornamental hinges.	II
Milestone opposite High Trees Lane, Greetland; 53.68327°N 1.89525°W	—	Mid 19th century	The milestone is on the south side of Saddleworth Road (B6114 road). It has a triangular plan and an arched head, and is overlaid in cast iron. On the top is "ELLAND AND SADDLEWORTH ROAD" "GREETLAND OUTER DISTRICT", and on the lower faces are the distances to Junction, Rochdale and Elland.	II
Milestone opposite Ingwood Mill, West Vale; 53.68418°N 1.86070°W		Mid 19th century	The milestone is on the southeast side of Stainland Road (B6112 road). It consists of a stone with a triangular plan, and it has two faces inscribed with the distances to Stainland and to Halifax.	II
United Reformed Sunday School, Holywell Green; 53.67569°N 1.86750°W		1853	The Sunday school. later a church, is in Jacobean style, and built in sandstone with a slate roof. There is one storey and a front of eight bays. The middle two bays have a shaped gable surmounted by a bellcote with a ball finial. At the east end is a porch with a shaped gable, and the windows are mullioned and transomed.	II
Holywell Hall; 53.67357°N 1.86998°W	—	1856	The house, which has Italian Renaissance features, is in gritstone, on a plinth, with bands, rusticated quoin pilasters, a stepped frieze, a moulded cornice, and a parapet with balustraded sections. There are two storeys and an attic, and three storeys on the south front. The entrance front on the east is gabled, it has three bays, a two-storey porch with pilasters, Doric columns, and a Doric entablature. In the upper storey are Ionic pilasters, an arched window flanked by oeil-de-boeuf windows, and a pedimented gable. The south front contains canted bay windows and has a balustraded terrace.	II
St Thomas' Church, Greetland; 53.68851°N 1.87237°W		1859–60	The tower was added in 1868. The church, which is in Gothic Revival style, is built in stone and has a slate roof. It consists of a nave, a south transept chapel, a chancel, and a west tower. The tower has three stages, it contains clock faces, and is surmounted by squat pinnacles. On the east gable of the nave is a Sanctus bellcote, and the windows have geometric tracery.	II
Holywell House; 53.67428°N 1.86660°W	—	c. 1860	A large house in stone with a slate roof, it has two storeys and a symmetrical front of nine bays. The middle five bays project, and contain round-headed windows, and in the outer of these bays are round-headed doorways. In the upper floor is a central balcony on consoles. The next outer bays contain two-storey canted bay windows, and in the outermost bays are flat-headed windows, those in the ground floor with cornices on consoles. At the rear, the middle bays also project, and contain a Venetian window with colonnettes as jambs.	II
Aviary, Shaw Park; 53.67278°N 1.86717°W		c. 1870	The aviary is in stone and has a roof of slate and corrugated iron. It consists of a central three-stage tower with flanking single-storey wings. The tower has a dentilled first floor band, a moulded and dentilled upper floor band, a bracketed eaves cornice and a pyramidal hipped roof with a curved rear gable. It contains a doorway with a pointed arch, and the windows are lancets.	II
Three towers and wall, Shaw Park; 53.67300°N 1.86825°W		c. 1870	Three stone towers linked by a wall with Gothic features. One tower is square, another is round, and the third is a tourelle, which at one time contained a dovecote.	II
West Vale Public Hall; 53.68753°N 1.85392°W		1873–74	The hall is in sandstone with a slate roof, and is in Italianate Gothic style. There are two storeys and a basement, a main block with five bays, and a tower to the left. The central bay is wider, and is gabled with a Lombardic frieze, a roundel, and a foliated finial. In the upper floor is a window in the style of a Venetian window, the lights round-headed and set in Gothic arches with decorative tympani. The lights are separated by paired pink granite columns with foliated capitals. The other windows in the upper floor have windows in a similar style, those in the ground floor have flat heads, and all have continuous stepped hood moulds. The tower has a corner entrance and contains a round arch on each side with gablets and finials. The top stage contains roundels, above is a pyramidal roof with small gableted dormers, and it is surmounted by a platform and a weathervane.	II
Railway viaduct near Holywell Green; 53.67894°N 1.86464°W		1875	The viaduct was built by the Lancashire and Yorkshire Railway for its Stainland Branch, and is now disused. It is in stone, and consists of 14 round-headed arches.	II
Railway viaduct over Stainland Road; 53.68504°N 1.85906°W		1875	The viaduct was built by the Lancashire and Yorkshire Railway for its Stainland Branch, and is now disused. It is in stone, and consists of 13 round-headed arches.	II
Mill House Lodge	—	Late 19th century	A pair of lodge cottages in rusticated stone on a plinth, with a Welsh slate roof. They have two storeys, a symmetrical T-shaped plan, a front of three bays, and oversailing eaves with decorative bargeboards and a finial. The doorways have chamfered quoined surrounds and Tudor arches. The windows are square-headed with tracery and cusped lights. Facing the drive is a canted bay window.	II
North Dean Mill, West Vale; 53.68857°N 1.85280°W		1876	The woollen mill, which was later extended and subsequently used for other purposes, is in gritstone with slate roofs. It consists of a spinning mill with an engine house to the north, a boiler room, and the base of a former chimney. This is linked to a parallel warehouse at the end of which is a house and offices. The mill has four storeys, it is 13 bays long, and four bays deep. At the north end is a five-storey stair and hoist tower. The engine house and boiler house each has a single storey, and on the roof of the boiler house is a cast iron water tank. The warehouse has two storeys and attics, and is seven bays long. The house has two storeys, four bays, dentilled eaves, and a hipped roof.	II
St John's Church, West Vale; 53.68775°N 1.85303°W		1880–82	The church, later used for other purposes, has Gothic and Romanesque features, it is built in stone with sandstone dressings, and has a slate roof. The church consists of a nave and a chancel under a single roof with a clerestory, north and south aisles, and a west tower incorporating a porch. The tower has three stages, clasping buttresses that rise to octagonal pinnacles, and a short octagonal spire. The windows along the sides of the church have round heads, and the east window consists of three lancets.	II
Prospect Mill, West Vale; 53.68862°N 1.85218°W		1883	The former textile mill is in gritstone with a blue slate roof. It consists of a spinning mill that contains the engine house, and the boiler house is on the east side. At the southern end is a warehouse and a shed. The spinning mill has five storeys, it is 22 bays long and five bays deep. At each end is a ramped parapet, that at the north end with the name of the mill and a date. On the east side is a projecting privy tower, and on the west side is a taller stair and water tank tower. The warehouse has a double hipped roof, three storeys and sides of four and three bays, the weaving shed has nine short bays, and the boiler house has one storey and a hipped roof.	II
Telephone kiosk, Jagger Green; 53.66931°N 1.86329°W	—	1935	The K6 type telephone kiosk was designed by Giles Gilbert Scott. Constructed in cast iron with a square plan and a dome, it has three unperforated crowns in the top panels.	II
