= Stainland =

Village in West Yorkshire, England

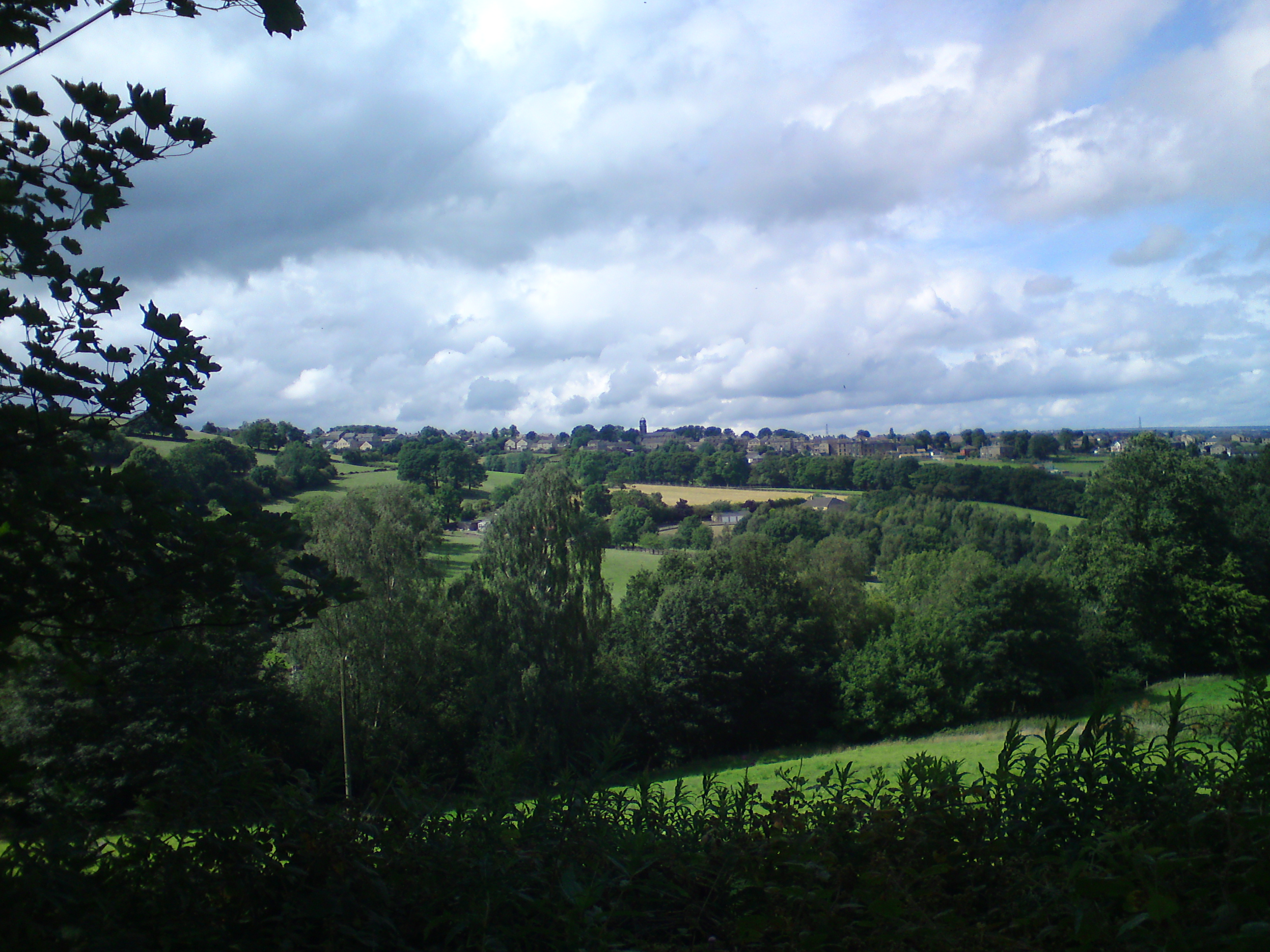
- Stainland, as seen from Jagger Green

- Location within West Yorkshire
- Population: 3,178 (2011 Census) (with Holywell Green)
- OS grid reference: SE079196
  - London: 170 mi (270 km) SE
- Civil parish: Stainland and District
- Metropolitan borough: Calderdale
- Metropolitan county: West Yorkshire
- Region: Yorkshire and the Humber
- Country: England
- Sovereign state: United Kingdom
- Post town: HALIFAX
- Postcode district: HX4
- Dialling code: 01422
- Police: West Yorkshire
- Fire: West Yorkshire
- Ambulance: Yorkshire
- UK Parliament: Calder Valley

Stainland is a village in the civil parish of Stainland and District, in Calderdale, West Yorkshire, England. The village is part of the Greetland and Stainland ward of Calderdale Council and is approximately 2 miles (3 km) west of Elland, 3.5 miles (6 km) south of Halifax and 4.3 miles (7 km) north-west of Huddersfield.

== History ==
Early routes and tracks followed high ground to avoid the marshy and wooded valley bottoms and it was on one such high level packhorse route that Stainland developed. The Stainland Cross remains as evidence of man's activity there in the medieval times.

The village's name comes from Old Norse and means Stony land; the land around Stainland is not very fertile. The village does not have a separate entry in the Domesday Book. An economy that was based principally on wool and textile production led Stainland to develop as a hilltop village, in much the same way as Sowerby and Heptonstall. With the Industrial Revolution, mills developed in the neighbouring valleys to take advantage of water power, but Stainland continued to act as a focus for the area. The village continued to thrive, and a number of notable buildings were added to the street scene. With the decline in its agricultural and industrial function, Stainland is now less self-contained than before.

Its proximity to the M62 motorway has led to the development of a new residential role of housing people who work in the neighbouring towns. That, in turn, is leading to new pressures for change in the fabric of the village.

In 2017, a new parish was formed, encompassing Stainland, Holywell Green, Sowood, Sowood Green, Jagger Green, Old Lindley and the parts of Outlane which fall within Calderdale. It was the first parish council to be formed in Calderdale since 1974.

== Geography ==
Stainland is situated between Holywell Green to the east, to which it is conjoined, and Sowood to the south, and occupies a hilltop position at about 800 feet (244 m) on a spur which projects from the higher land of Pole Moor and Outlane to the south. The main road through the village is Stainland Road, the B6112.

Due to its altitude and remote location, places visible are (clockwise from north): King Cross, Savile Park, Halifax, Southowram, Siddal, Greetland, Elland Wood, Blackley, Ainley Top, Jagger Green, Thunnerley Wood, Old Lindley, Outlane, parts of Sowood, Scammonden, Krumlin, Barkisland, Norland Moor and Norland. On a clear day, Ovenden, Queensbury, Saddleworth Moor and even Wyke are visible. Stainland is essentially linear: all the principal buildings face the main road which forms a central spine. There is not generally a building line to which development can conform and the road narrows at 'pinch points' where the buildings are closer. This leads to an unfolding series of vistas as one travels through the village. Much of the lesser domestic buildings has developed on minor lanes at right angles to the road and these dense clusters of houses provide areas of enclosure with occasional dramatic glimpses across open countryside. The architecture of Stainland, using local materials, represents all phases of the village's history. Stainland is a conservation area, which was designated on 30 November 1982.

=== Holywell Green ===
Holywell Green, at the eastern side of Stainland, is often wrongly referred to as the main settlement. The boundary between Stainland and Holywell Green is 53°40′26″N 01°52′23″W, between West View and Bradley View.

Location grid

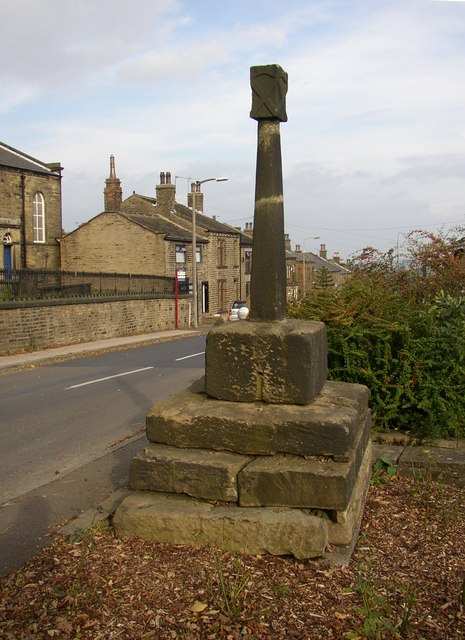
Stainland Cross

== Landmarks ==
=== Stainland Cross ===
On the roadside across from St Andrew's Church stands the Stainland Cross, relocated here in the twentieth century. It represents a saltire carved on a block of stone. The block is scooped out in the form of a cup but the cover that was formerly attached to it has been removed. The column is circular and plain without any of that rich, strange sculpture or scroll ornament which antiquarians generally attribute to Saxon or Danish sculptures. Its height from the base to the top of the sculpture is about 10 feet (3.0 m), the column doesn't exceed 5 feet (1.5 m). Neither history nor tradition have preserved the date or purpose of its construction.

On 3 September 1875 The Building News announced that the cross was to be restored according to plans by a "Mr Barber of Halifax." The railings in old images of the cross in its previous position, were probably added by Barber.

=== Stainland Mechanics' Institute ===
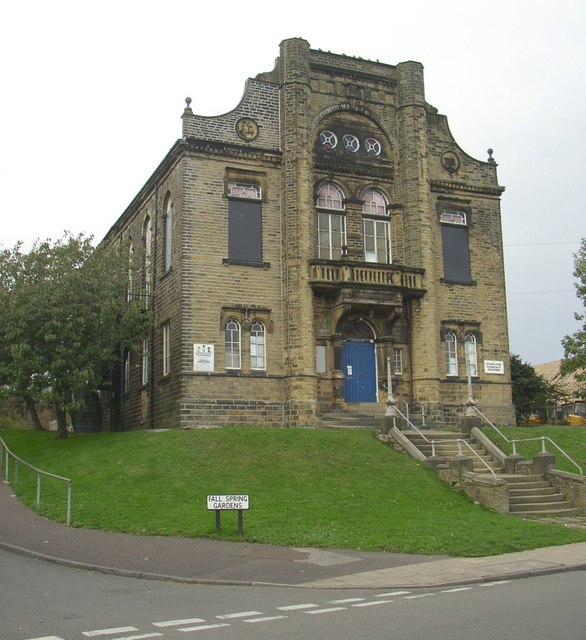
Stainland Mechanic's Institute

Stainland Mechanics' Institute was built by the Shaw family in 1883 by public description, "to improve the moral, social and intellectual habits of the inhabitants". The building was opened by the Mayor of Leeds on 7 June 1884. Over the years it suffered as income declined. By 1952, the trustees decided to sell the building but offered it to Elland UDC. In 1954, a Community Centre was formed by the Trustees. In 1967 it was taken over by Elland UDC. Some maintenance was undertaken but by 1974, when Calderdale MBC became the owners, it needed repairs. In 1977, the council demolished the twin towers at the entrance. Several surveys were carried out but £500,000 was required to bring it up to standard. A committee tried to raise this money but was not successful and the centre closed on 18 December 2009. The building was signed back to the council and declared surplus to requirements. In January 2011, councillors voted to sell the building as the cost to bring the building up to standard is too much.

=== St Helen's Well ===
St Helen's Well at the eastern end of the village is mentioned in John Watson's monumental The History and Antiquities of the Parish of Halifax, 1775. He gives no description but says a Roman Catholic chapel dedicated to Saint Helen, nearby had been converted into a cottage, but in its walls was a large stone known locally as 'the Cross'. Strangers, presumed to be Catholics, made pilgrimages to the well. Watson also possessed a deed which mentioned a grant made to Henry de Sacro Fonte de Staynland. dated between 1279 and 1324. The well was restored in 1843 in response to interest in drinking 'spa' water. The 'Halifax Guardian' for September 1842 described the scene around Well Head spa where crowds carrying drinking utensils jostled each other in their eagerness to take the waters. Well Head was the most popular of the Halifax spas but several other springs in the area were frequented. Similar scenes may have occurred around Stainland's well. In the late 19th century the well was declining. The stone trough had cracked and was leaking. Local placenames reflect the importance of the well. The eastern end of the village is known as Holywell Green, there is a public house called 'The Holywell Inn' and a 'St Helen's Court'. The well was further restored in 1977 and the crumbling trough of the woodcut has been replaced by a solid modern one, no water flows into it.

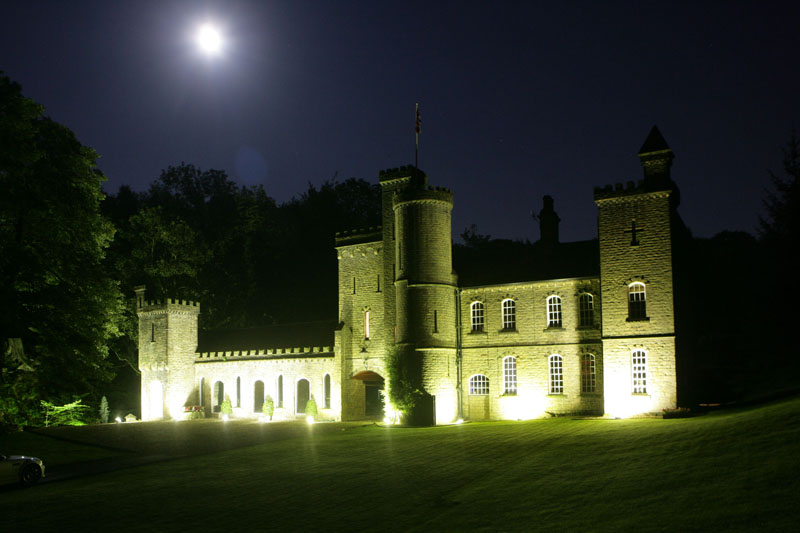
Carr Hall Castle

=== Carr Hall Castle ===
Carr Hall Castle, located on the edge of Thunnerley Wood in the Holywell Brook valley, was built in the mid-nineteenth century by the Shaw family, local mill owners, to improve the view from their mansion at Shaw Park. It provided a stable block and housing for the bailiff who bred the shire horses for Brookroyd Mills. The building has been restored and modernised since 2002. In 2008 the castle won Channel Five's TV show I Own Britain's Best Home.

== Religion ==
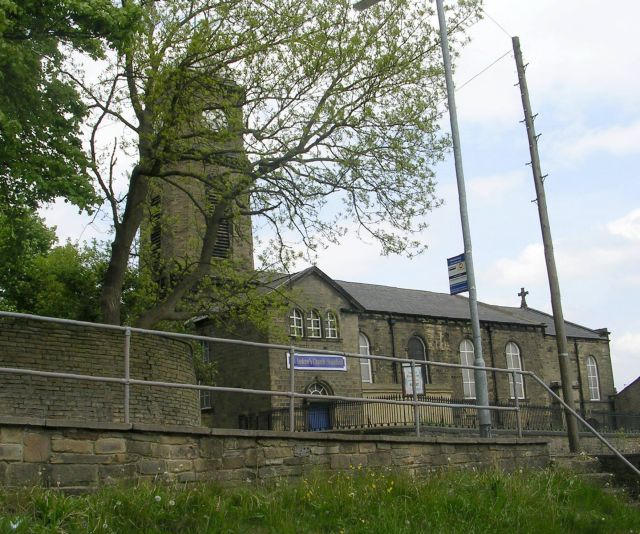
St Andrew's Church, Stainland

St Andrew's C of E Church in the centre of the village was built c.1755 as a chapel for Stainland, Holywell Green and Sowood. The church tower is visible from Norland and Blackley.

Stainland had three other chapels, Stainland Providence Chapel, Stainland Wesleyan Chapel and a mortuary chapel. The mortuary chapel was next to a graveyard that served the Providence Chapel. All three graveyards remain but only the Providence Chapel remains and was converted into nine houses. The mortuary chapel was demolished after the Providence Chapel became houses. The Wesleyan Chapel was demolished to make way for houses.

== Community ==
=== Public houses and restaurants ===
Pubs include The Duke of York, The Red Lion and The Rose and Crown. The Bull and Dog (also known as The Stone Ridge) closed in 2008. The Black Horse Inn was demolished and replaced by a garage and more recently housing.

=== Sport ===
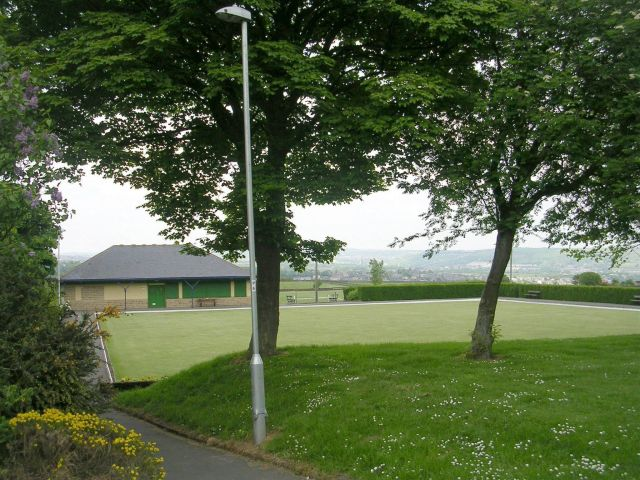
Stainland Bowling Green, with the pavilion. The cricket ground is beyond the pavilion

Stainland has five sports clubs; Stainland United FC, Stainland Stags ARLFC, Stainland CC, Stainland Lions Running Club and Stainland Bowling Club. All are based at Stainland Recreation Ground except for Stainland Lions who are based at Heath RUFC, Greetland.

Stainland Recreation Ground (Stainland Rec or the Rec) lies west of the village centre and has two football pitches, a rugby pitch, a cricket ground, a bowling green, a tennis court, a five-a-side pitch, and a playground.

Stainland United FC play in the Halifax and District League First Division. The club was formed in 1947 as Stainland Athletic and changed its name to Stainland United in 1980. In 1992 the club folded but reformed in 1997 and won the Halifax Premier Division in the 2006–07 season.

Stainland Stags ARLFC play in the Pennine League First Division and coached by ex super league player Danny Fearon.

Stainland Cricket Club and Stainland Bowling Club share a pavilion at Stainland Recreational Ground. The pavilion was built in 2001 after the previous pavilion burnt down. The ground is called the Memorial Ground after it was given as a post-war gift in 1922. It is one of the biggest in the Halifax League. They played at Drury Lane for 40 years. Stainland CC play in the Towergate Halifax Cricket League Second Division. Stainland won the Second Division title in 1979 and 2002.

=== Education ===
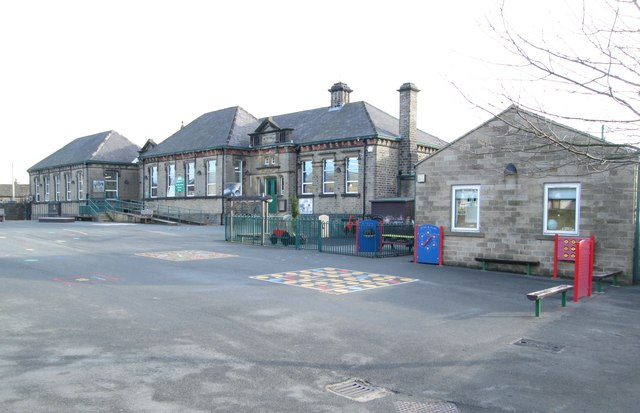
Bowling Green Primary School

Bowling Green Primary School is on Bowling Green Road and is under the local authority of Calderdale Council. The first school on the site was built by the local overseer of the poor in 1805. The present school building, built on the former bowling green and designed by John Leeming (1849–1931) of Halifax, was opened by the School Board on 24 February 1882, its two foundation stones being dated 1 October 1881. The foundation stones were laid by John Mellor and Thomas Carter, the chairman and vice chairman of the School Board. Local ratepayers funded their silver trowels for the ceremony. Joseph Stott, a board member, gave a speech saying that "he believed there was a necessity for additional means of instruction," before hundreds of people were given tea in the local Sunday school room.

== See also ==
- Listed buildings in Greetland and Stainland
