= Sowood, West Yorkshire =

Village in West Yorkshire, England

Coordinates: 53.662045°N 1.880791°W

Sowood
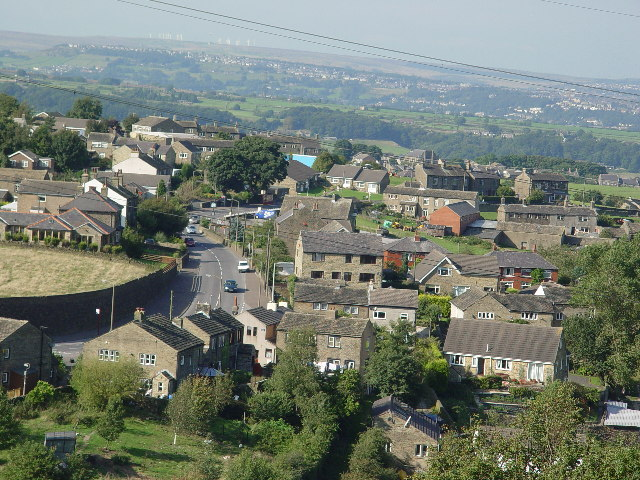
- View over Sowood from Sowood Hill

- Location within West Yorkshire
- OS grid reference: SE079184
- Civil parish: Stainland and District
- Metropolitan borough: Calderdale
- Metropolitan county: West Yorkshire
- Region: Yorkshire and the Humber
- Country: England
- Sovereign state: United Kingdom
- Post town: HALIFAX
- Postcode district: HX4
- Dialling code: 01422
- Police: West Yorkshire
- Fire: West Yorkshire
- Ambulance: Yorkshire
- UK Parliament: Calder Valley

Sowood is a village in the civil parish of Stainland and District, in the Calderdale district of West Yorkshire, England. The village is in the Greetland and Stainland ward of Calderdale Council. It is 2.3 miles (3.7 km) south-west of Elland, 4.1 miles (6.6 km) north-west of Huddersfield and 4.2 miles (6.8 km) south of Halifax.

== Geography ==
Sowood, one of the highest places in Calderdale, is 280 metres (920 ft) above sea level. The main road through the village, the B6112, which links it to Stainland, Greetland, and Outlane. It is close to the Calderdale and Kirklees district boundary.

== See also ==
- Listed buildings in Greetland and Stainland
