= Blackley, West Yorkshire =

Hamlet in West Yorkshire, England

Coordinates: 53.674°N 1.843°W

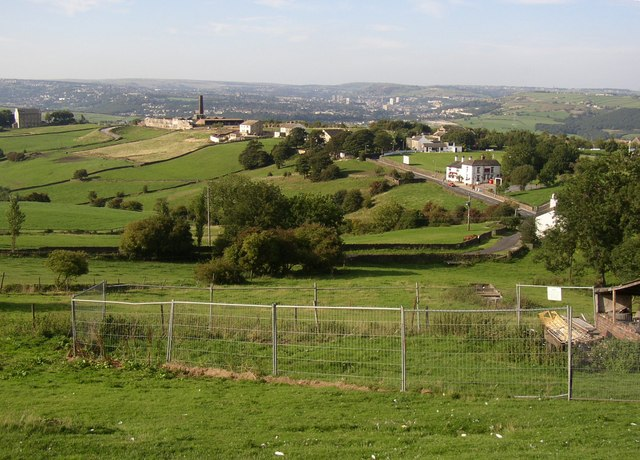
View of Blackley from the south

Blackley is a hamlet in the Calderdale district, in the county of West Yorkshire, England. It is near the town of Elland, the A629 road and the M62 motorway and can be accessed from junction 24. There is also the village of Ainley Top nearby.

Between 1894 and 1985, Blackley was the site of Wilkinsons Brickworks who exported thousands of bricks per year all over the world. There have been attempts to regenerate the land that the brickworks occupied.

== See also ==
- Listed buildings in Elland
