= Stainland and District =

Coordinates: 53°40′N 01°52′W

- Stainland and District parish within Calderdale

- Location within West Yorkshire
- Civil parish: Stainland and District
- Metropolitan borough: Calderdale
- Metropolitan county: West Yorkshire
- Region: Yorkshire and the Humber
- Country: England
- Sovereign state: United Kingdom

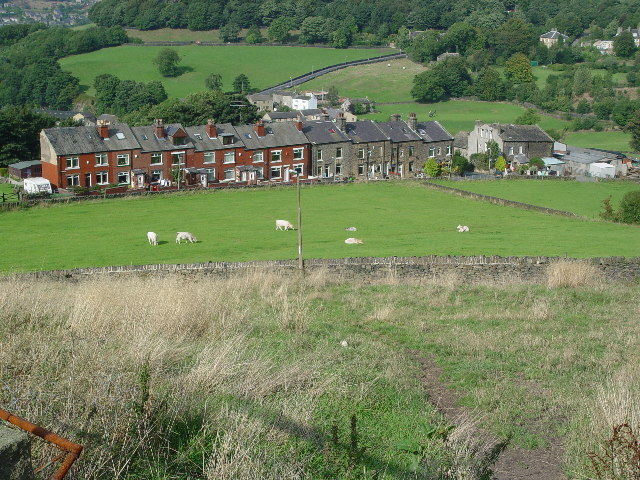
Jagger Green

Stainland and District is a civil parish in the Metropolitan Borough of Calderdale in West Yorkshire, England. The main settlements in the parish are Stainland, Holywell Green and Sowood. Other settlements include Jagger Green, Old Lindley and Sowood Green. The parish also covers part of Outlane.

== History ==
Historically part of the West Riding of Yorkshire, it was administered by Elland Urban District until 1974. From 1974 the area was part of Elland unparished area until the parish was formed on 1 April 2017. It was the first new parish creation since the borough of Calderdale was established in 1974.
