= Kebroyd =

Hamlet in West Yorkshire, England

Coordinates: 53.686°N 1.936°W

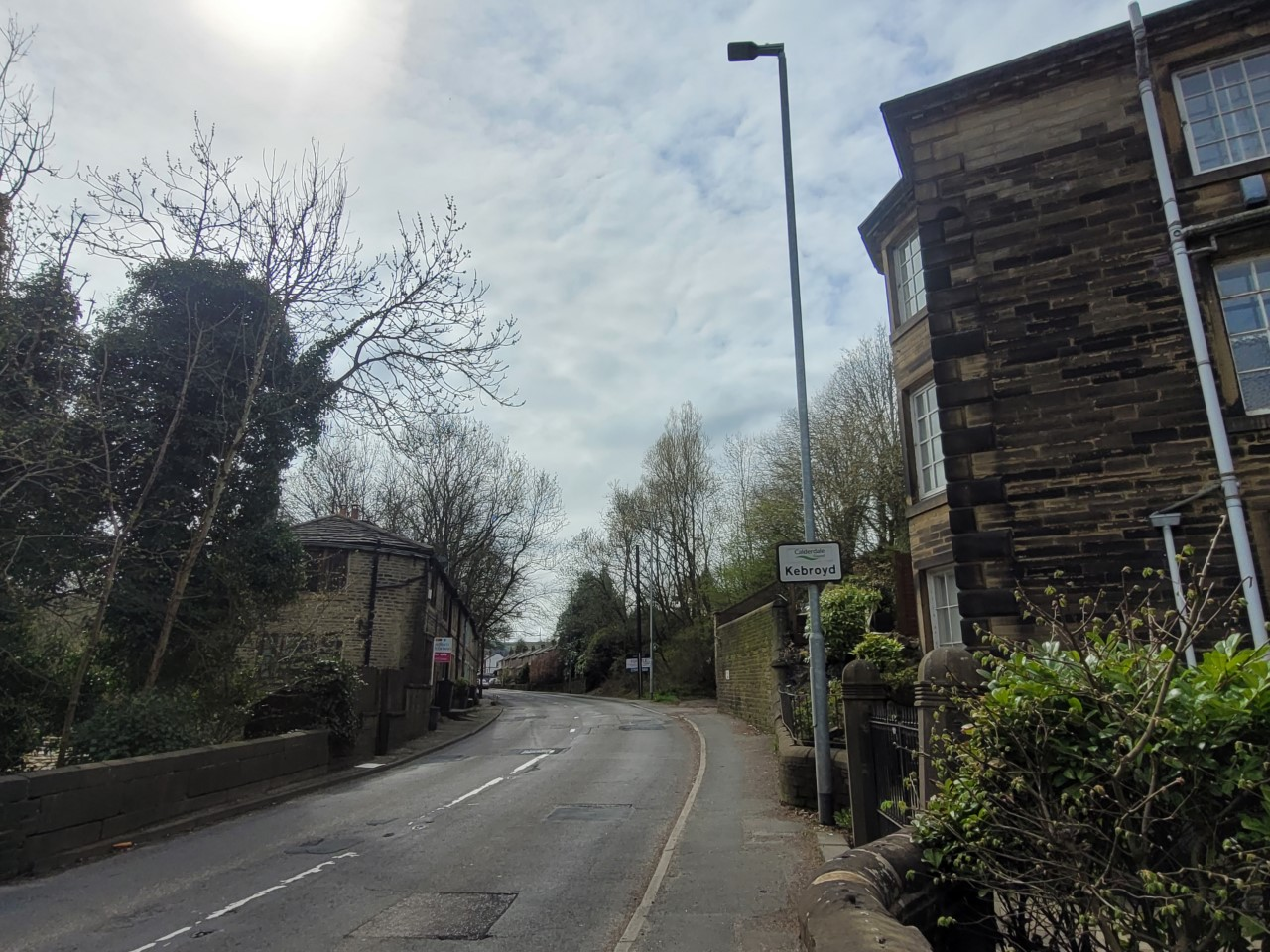
- Kebroyd view from Halifax Road

- Location within West Yorkshire
- OS grid reference: SE 04363 21094
- Civil parish: Ripponden
- Metropolitan borough: Calderdale
- Metropolitan county: West Yorkshire
- Region: Yorkshire and the Humber
- Country: England
- Sovereign state: United Kingdom
- Post town: Sowerby Bridge
- Dialling code: 01422
- Police: West Yorkshire
- Fire: West Yorkshire
- Ambulance: Yorkshire

Kebroyd is a small hamlet in the civil parish of Ripponden, in the Calderdale district, in West Yorkshire, England, within the valley of the River Ryburn, between Sowerby Bridge and Ripponden. Kebroyd has an approximate population of 548 people as per the UK 2011 census (Output Area E00055242 and E00055241).

== History ==
The name Kebroyd is believed to have derived from the Old English words "keb" and "royd", keb meaning "shelter for lambs" or "old sheep", and "royd" meaning clearing. The hamlet has a rich history, with evidence of human settlement dating back to the Iron Age.

During the Industrial Revolution, Calderdale became a hub for textile manufacturing, with several mills being established in the area including Kebroyd Silk Mills.

There are several Grade II listed buildings dating to the 17th century in Kebroyd, including Kebroyd Hall, Denton House and the row of Mill cottages on Halifax Road.

== Gallery ==
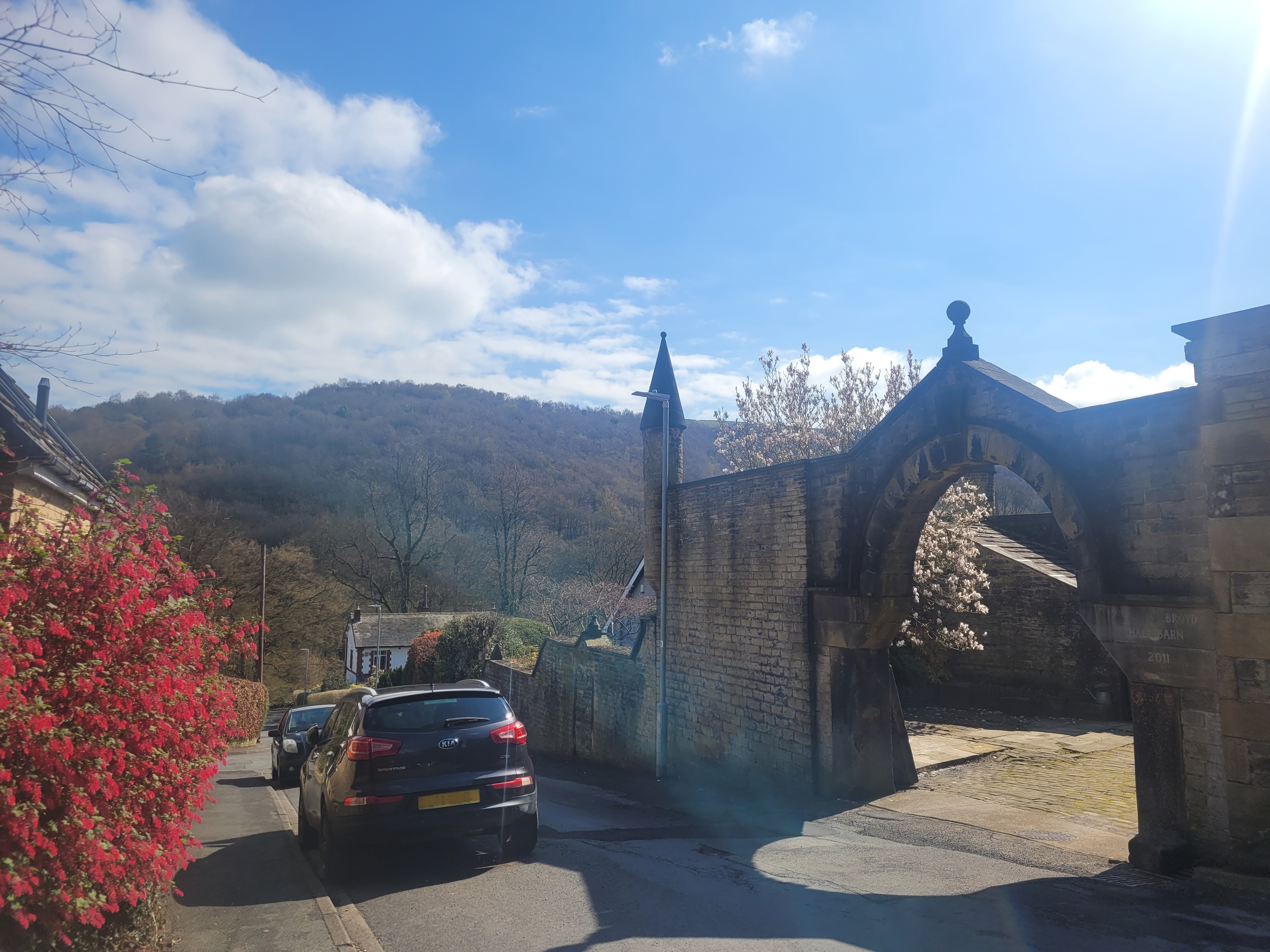
Kebroyd Lane

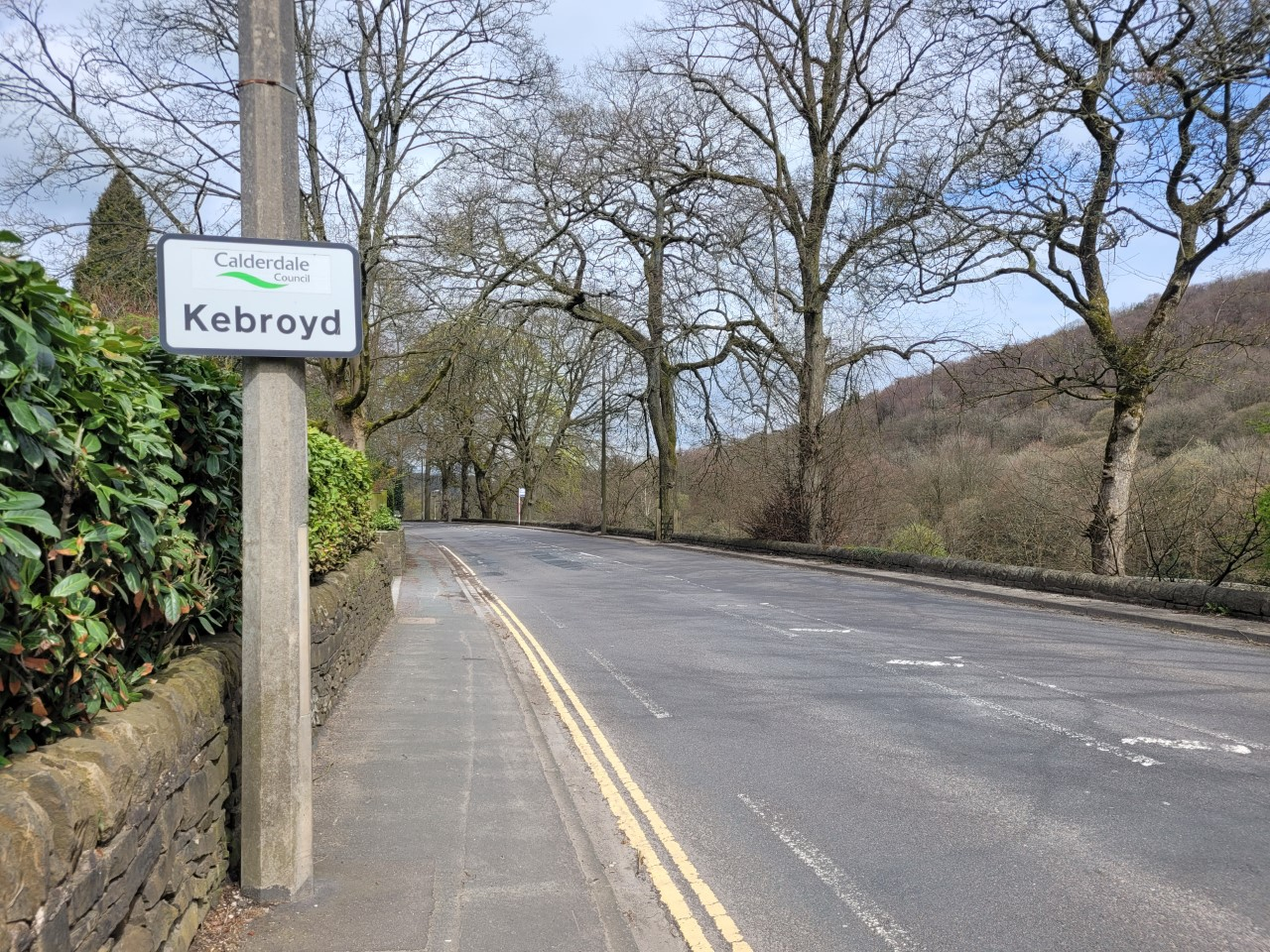
Halifax Road

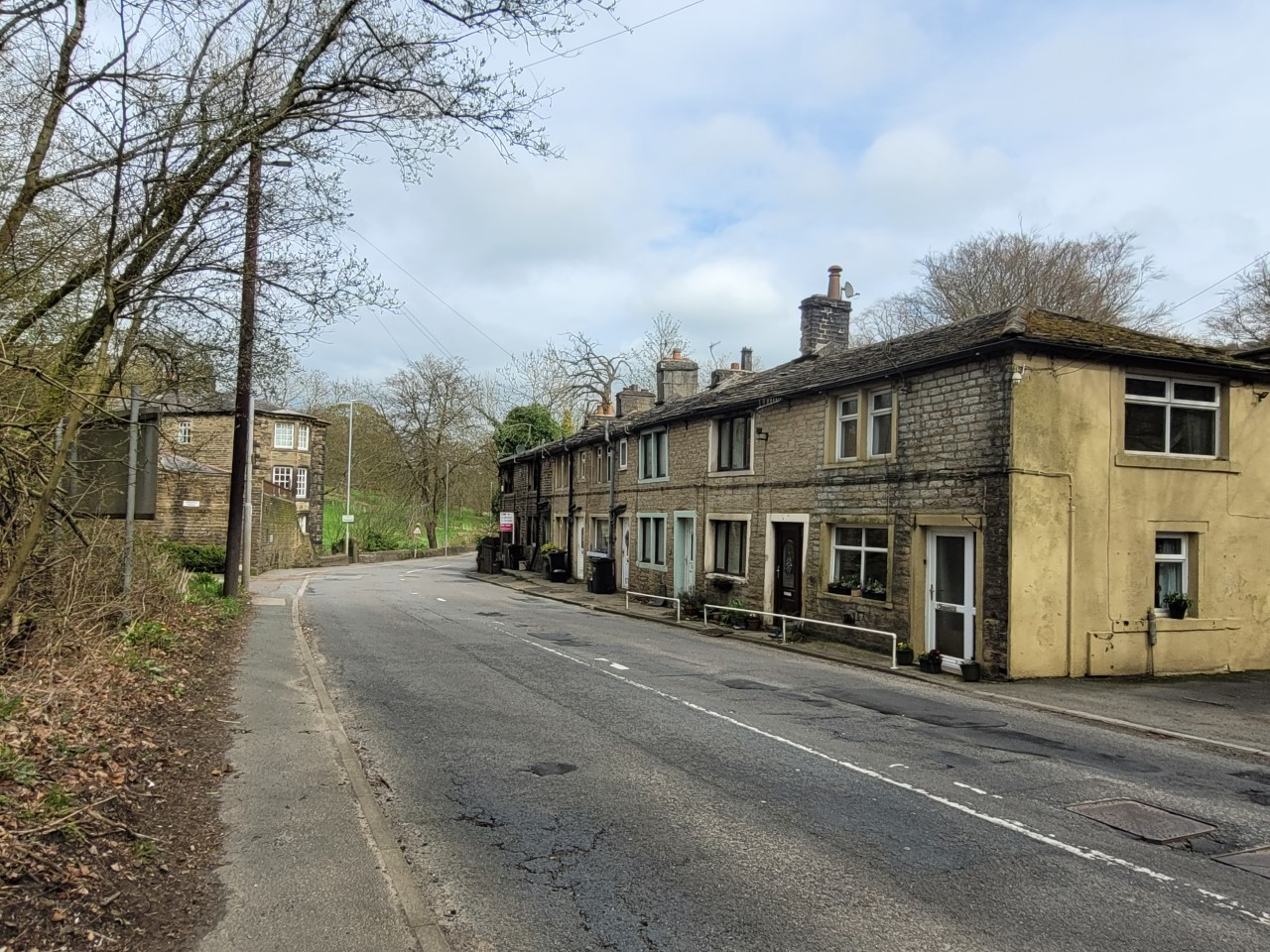
Kebroyd Avenue
