= Ainley Top =

Coordinates: 53.6712°N 1.8285°W

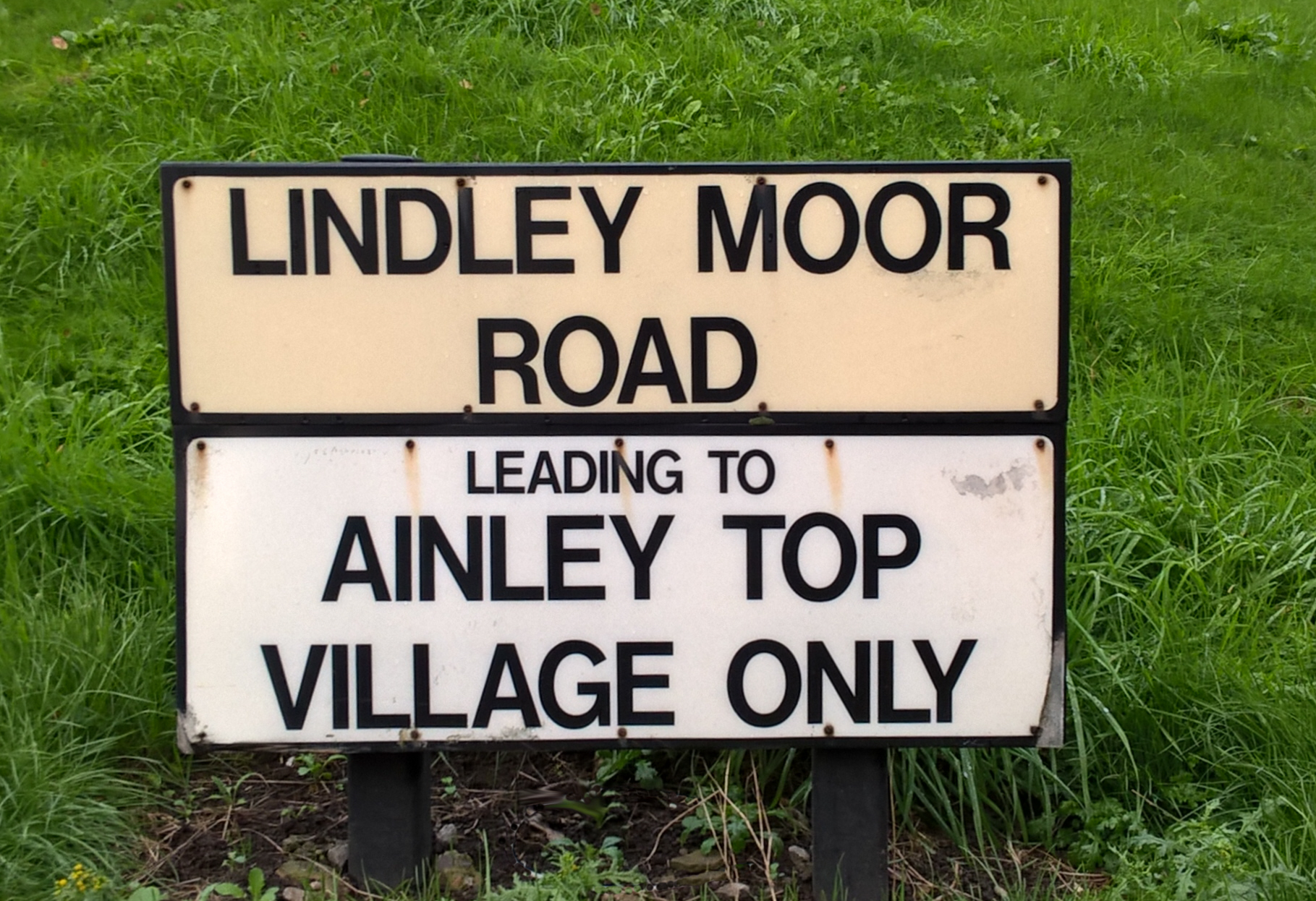
- Village sign

- Location within West Yorkshire
- Population: 649 (inc. Blackley)
- OS grid reference: SE115195
- Metropolitan borough: Calderdale
- Metropolitan county: West Yorkshire
- Region: Yorkshire and the Humber
- Country: England
- Sovereign state: United Kingdom
- Post town: HUDDERSFIELD
- Postcode district: HD2
- Postcode district: HD3
- Dialling code: 01422
- Police: West Yorkshire
- Fire: West Yorkshire
- Ambulance: Yorkshire
- UK Parliament: Calder Valley

Ainley Top is a village in Calderdale, West Yorkshire in England. It is situated approximately 3 miles (4.8 km) north west of Huddersfield on the A629 to Elland and Halifax.

It is situated on a hill (the Ainleys) with the M62 motorway to the north, and junction 24 of the motorway adjacent to the village. It is in the Elland ward of Calderdale Metropolitan Borough Council with 419 registered electors in 248 properties in 2013.

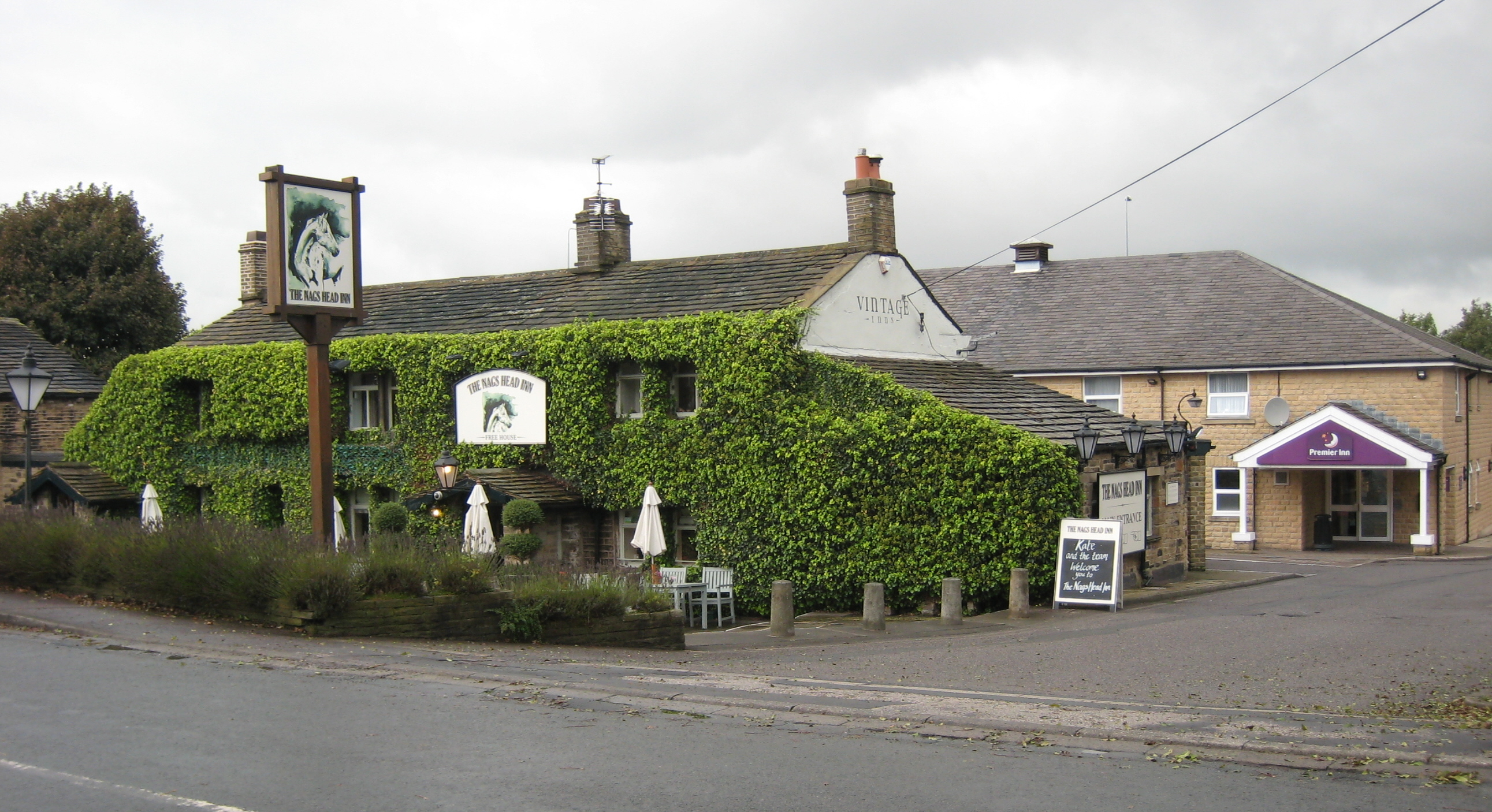
Nag's Head Inn

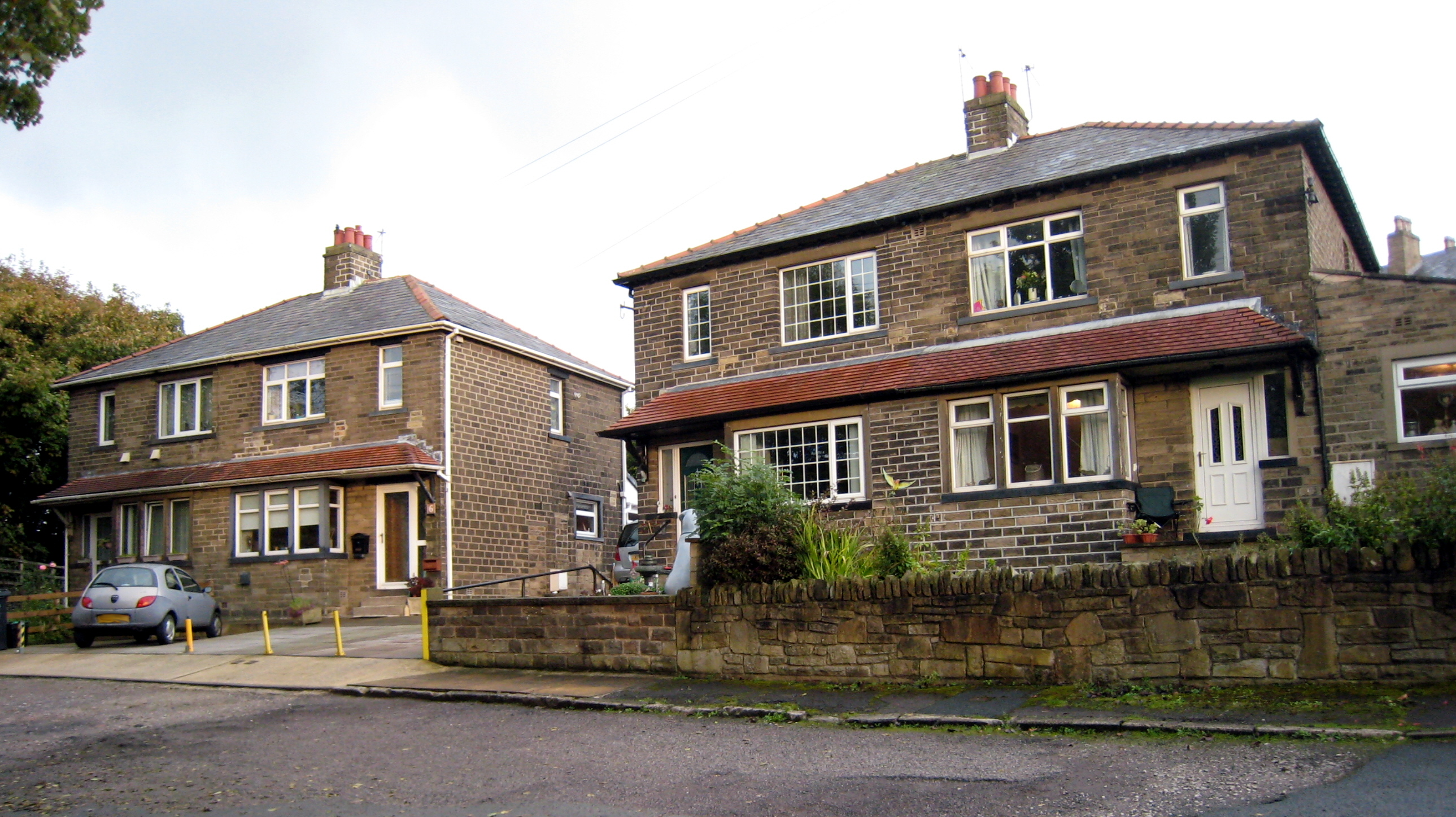
Hill Top Avenue

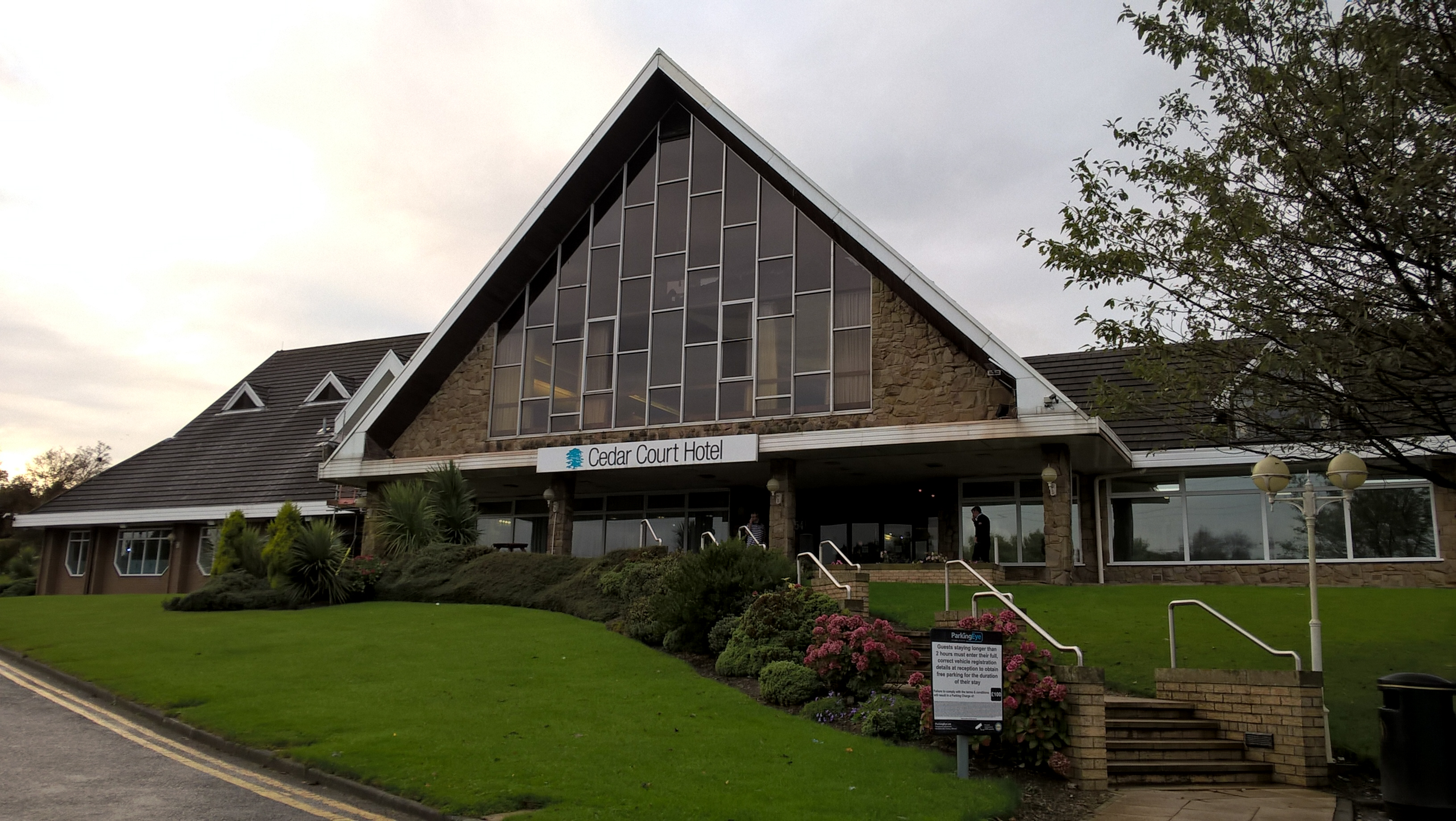
Cedar Court Hotel, Lindley Moor Road

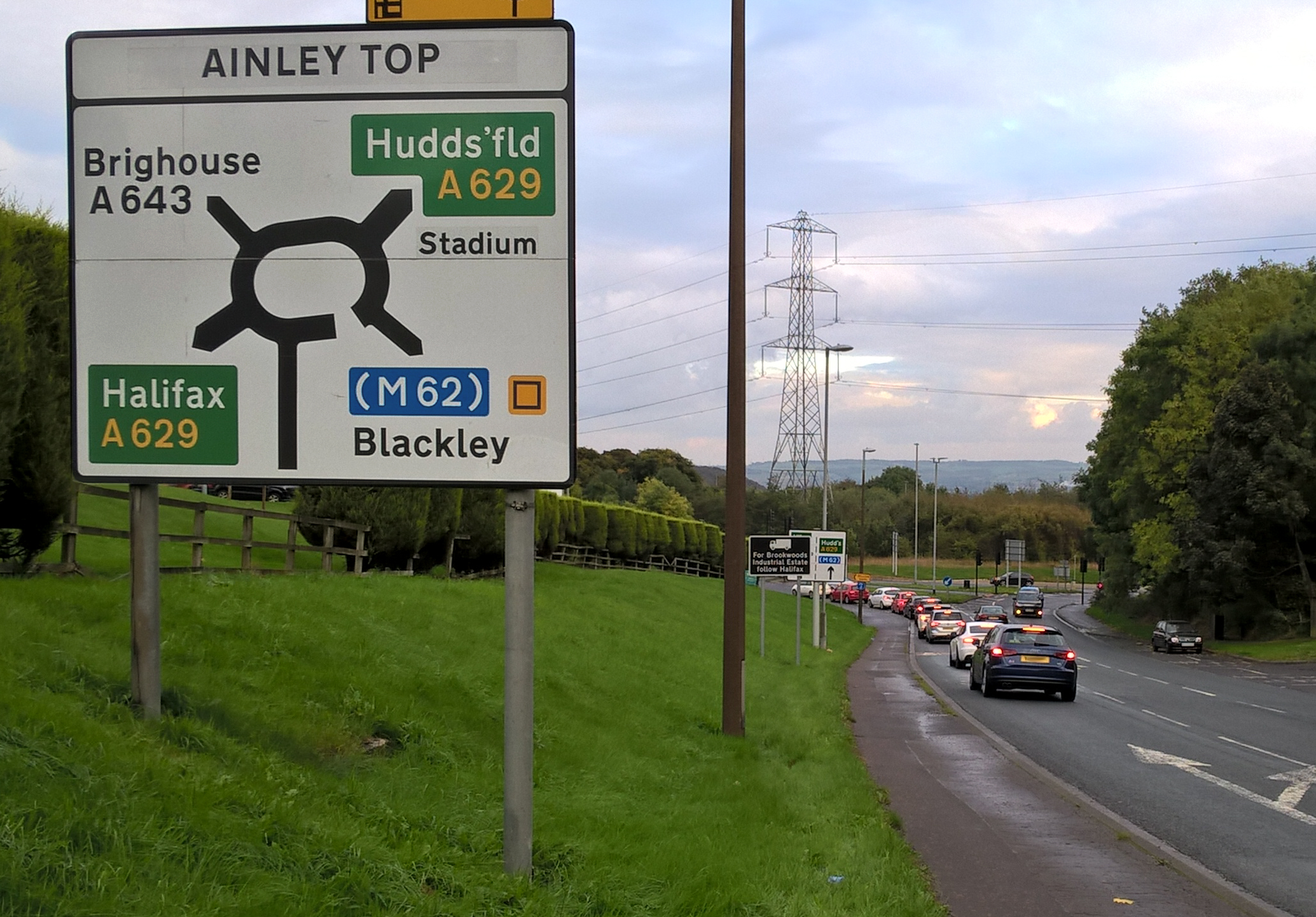
Ainley Top Roundabout

== Transport ==
Ainley Top is also the name of the roundabout just south of the village. This is the junction of the A643 and the A629 and also gives access to junction 24 of the M62 motorway.

The 1.5 miles (2.4 km) section of the M62 running from Outlane to Ainley Top opened at lunchtime on Wednesday 20 December 1972.
