= Outlane =

Village in West Yorkshire, England

Coordinates: 53.657°N 1.874°W

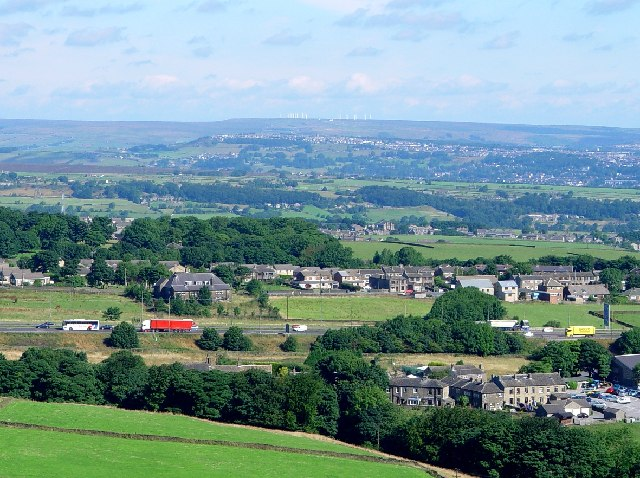
- Outlane and the M62 motorway

- Location within West Yorkshire
- Population: 710 (2001 Census)
- OS grid reference: SE085179
- Metropolitan borough: Kirklees; Calderdale
- Metropolitan county: West Yorkshire
- Region: Yorkshire and the Humber
- Country: England
- Sovereign state: United Kingdom
- Post town: HUDDERSFIELD
- Postcode district: HD3
- Dialling code: 01422
- Police: West Yorkshire
- Fire: West Yorkshire
- Ambulance: Yorkshire
- UK Parliament: Colne Valley; Calder Valley

Outlane is a village in Kirklees, West Yorkshire, England, situated approximately 2.5 miles (4 km) south-west of Elland, 3.7 miles (6 km) north-west of Huddersfield and 4.5 miles (7 km) south of Halifax.

The village is situated next to the M62 motorway near Junction 23 and straddles the Kirklees and Calderdale borough boundary; while the bulk of the village is within Kirklees, the north-western part of the village is part of Calderdale and the Stainland & District civil parish. The A640 Huddersfield to Rochdale (New Hey Road) road passes through the village.

Outlane Cricket Club, who currently play in the Halifax Cricket League, objected to the building of the motorway in the 1960s as it would go through their ground. However the Ministry of Transport turned down the objection. Outlane has a golf course that borders the motorway.

Slack Lane is the location of Slack Roman fort, whose Roman name was possibly Cambodunum.

== See also ==
- Listed buildings in Colne Valley (eastern area)
- Listed buildings in Greetland and Stainland
