= Old Lindley =

Coordinates: 53.6677°N 1.8600°W

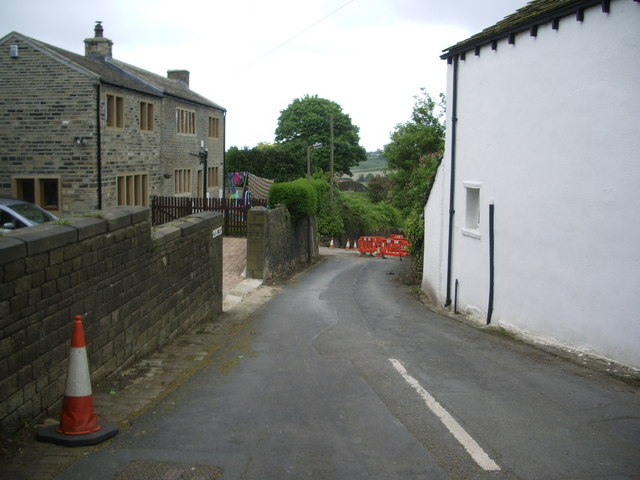

- Location within West Yorkshire
- Civil parish: Stainland and District
- Metropolitan borough: Calderdale
- Metropolitan county: West Yorkshire
- Region: Yorkshire and the Humber
- Country: England
- Sovereign state: United Kingdom

Old Lindley or Over Lindley is a hamlet in the civil parish of Stainland and District, in the Calderdale district, in the county of West Yorkshire, England. It is near the hamlet of Jagger Green, the village of Holywell Green and the town of Elland. Old Lindley has a moor called Old Lindley Moor.

== History ==
The name "Lindley" means 'Flax wood/clearing', the 'Old' to distinguish from Lindley. Old Lindley was recorded in the Domesday Book as Linlei/Linleie, Old Lindley was also known as "Linley(e)", "Lynley(e)", "Lynlay", Hold(e) "Lynlay", Old(e) "Lynlay", "Over Lynlay", "Linneley", "Lyndeley" and "Ouldlindley".

== Governance ==
Old Lindley was in the township of Stainland, in 1866 the civil parish of Stainland with Old Lindley was formed, on 1 April 1937 Stainland with Old Lindley parish was abolished and Old Lindley became part of Elland parish, which on 1 April 1974 became unparished. In 2017 it became part of the parish of Stainland and District.

== Landmarks ==
There is a grade II listed house in Old Lindley that is now in 3 occupations. There was a pottery in Old Lindley.
