= Calderdale =

Metropolitan borough in West Yorkshire, England

Coordinates: 53.72°N 1.97°W

Borough of Calderdale
- Metropolitan borough
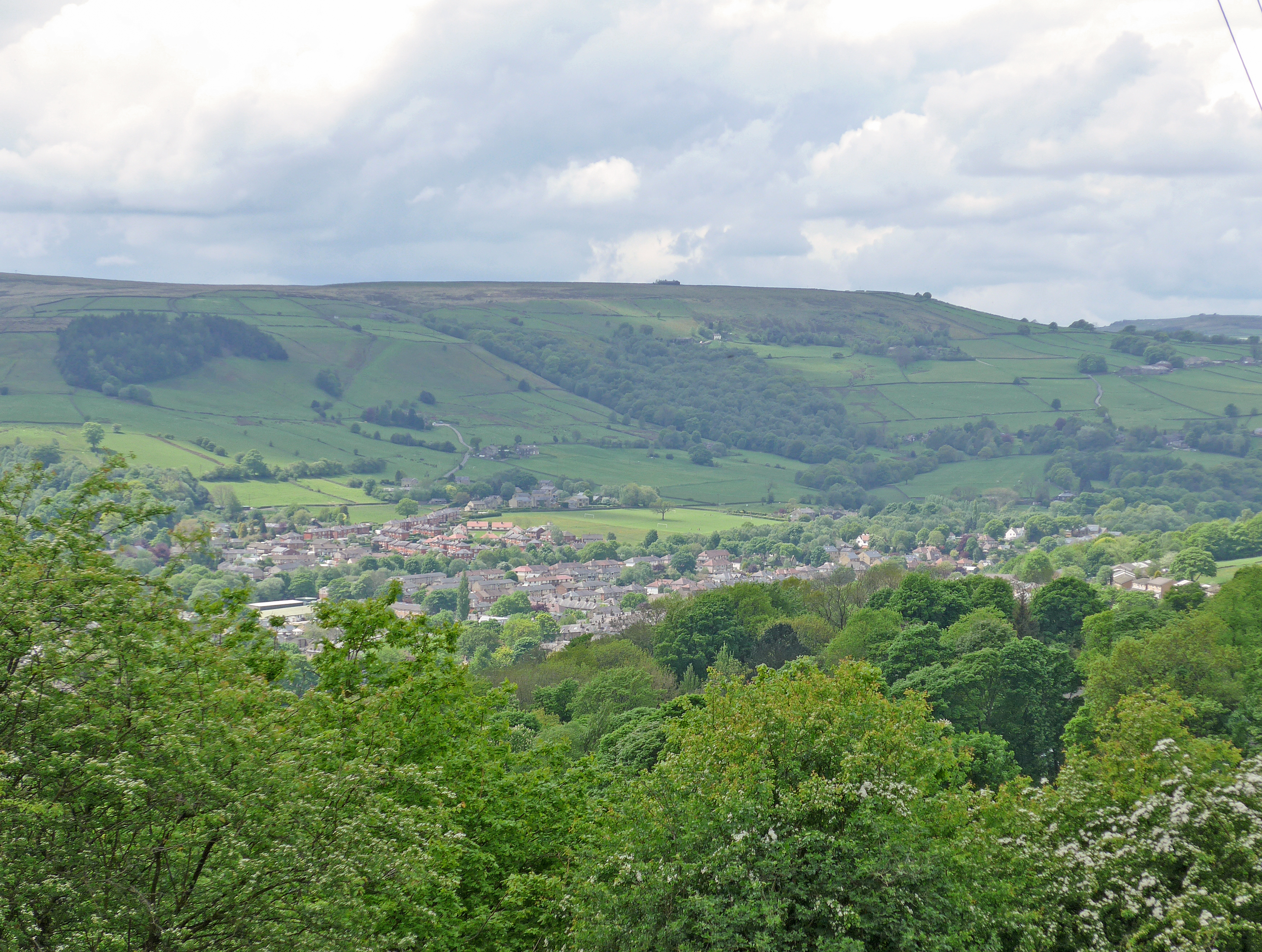
- View over Mytholmroyd in the Upper Calder Valley

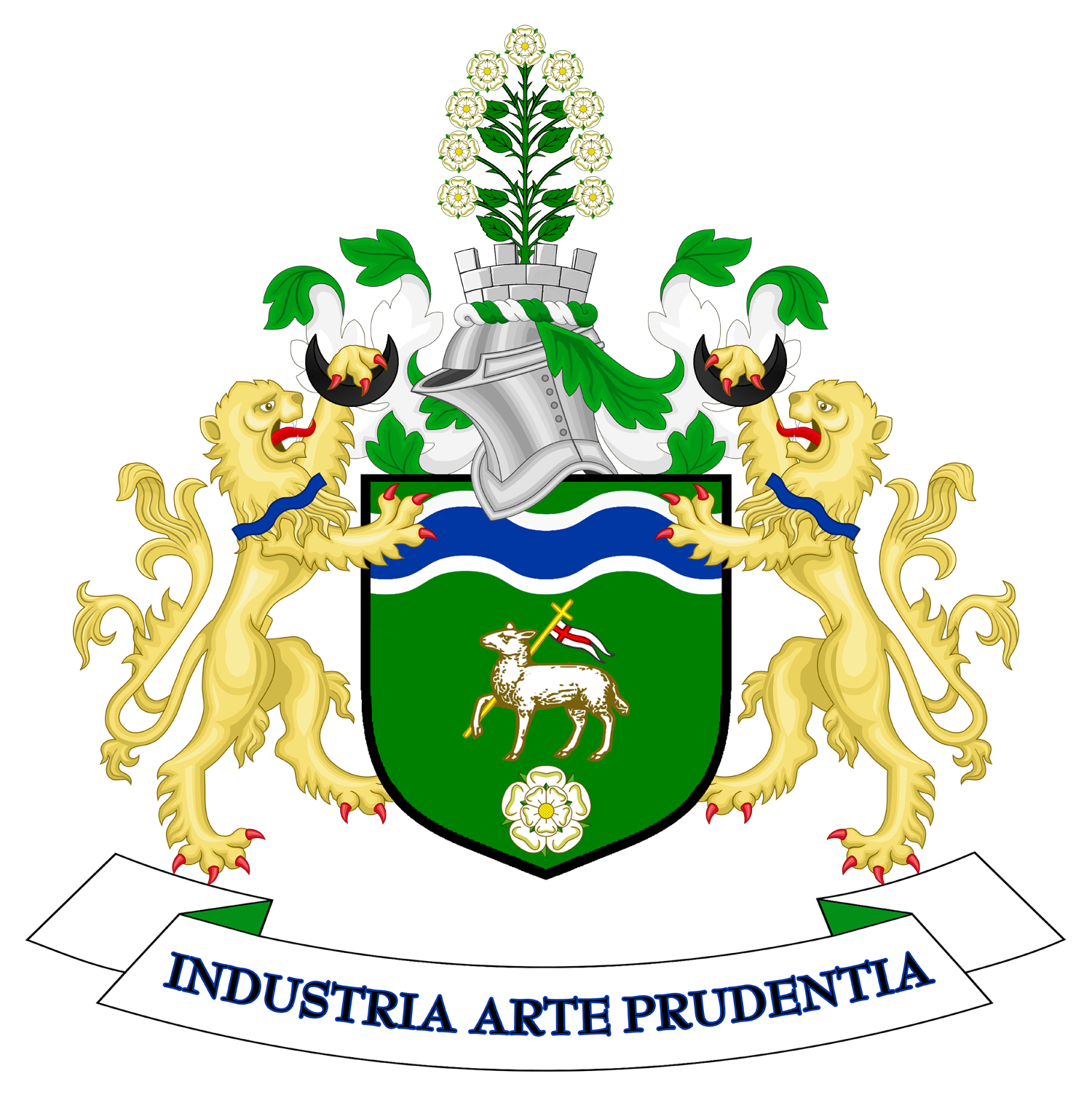
- Coat of arms of Calderdale Borough Council
- Motto: Industria Arte Prudentia (Latin: Industry, skill and foresight)
- Calderdale shown within West Yorkshire
- Sovereign state: United Kingdom
- Constituent country: England
- Region: Yorkshire and the Humber
- Metropolitan county: West Yorkshire
- Admin. HQ: Halifax
- Established: 1 April 1974

Government
  - Type: Metropolitan Borough
  - Body: Calderdale Council
  - Leadership: Leader & Cabinet
  - MPs: Josh Fenton-Glynn (L) (Calder Valley), Kate Dearden (L) (Halifax)

Area
  - Total: 140.5 sq mi (363.9 km^{2})

Population (2020 estimate)
  - Total: 211,439 (Ranked 96th)
  - Density: 1,500/sq mi (581/km^{2})

Ethnicity (2021)
  - Ethnic groups: List: 86.1% White; 10.5% Asian; 1.9% Mixed; 0.8% other; 0.7% Black

Religion (2021)
  - Religion: List: 42% no religion; 41.5% Christianity; 9.5% Islam; 5.4% not stated; 0.6% Hinduism; 0.5% other; 0.3% Buddhism; 0.2% Sikhism; 0.1% Judaism
- Time zone: UTC+0 (Greenwich Mean Time)
  - Summer (DST): UTC+1 (British Summer Time)
- Postcode areas: HD2–HD6, HX1–HX7, OL14, WF14, BD13–BD19
- Dialling Codes: 01422 (central core); 01484 (Brighouse/Rastrick); 01706 (Todmorden area); 01274 (Shelf area)
- ONS code: 00CY (ONS); E08000033 (GSS)
- ISO 3166-2: GB-CLD
- Website: calderdale.gov.uk

Calderdale (/ˈkɔːldərdeɪl, ˈkɒl-/) is a metropolitan borough of West Yorkshire, England, which had a population of 211,439. It takes its name from the River Calder, and dale, a word for valley. The name Calderdale usually refers to the borough through which the upper river flows, while the actual landform is known as the Calder Valley. Several small valleys contain tributaries of the River Calder. The main towns of the borough are Brighouse, Elland, Halifax, Hebden Bridge, Sowerby Bridge and Todmorden.

Calderdale covers part of the South Pennines, and the Calder Valley is the southernmost of the Yorkshire Dales, though it is not part of the Yorkshire Dales National Park. The borough was formed in 1974 by the merger of nine local government districts.

Halifax is the commercial, cultural and administrative centre of the borough. Calderdale is served by Calderdale Council, which is headquartered in Halifax, with some functions based in Todmorden.

== History ==
The Roman settlement of Cambodunum is traditionally associated with the Calderdale area, though its precise location remains a matter of debate. Archaeological excavations have identified a Roman fort and associated civilian settlement (vicus) at Slack, now within the neighbouring borough of Kirklees, which many historians equate with Cambodunum mentioned in Roman itineraries such as the Antonine Itinerary. However, because Slack lies outside the modern boundaries of Calderdale and because the exact correspondence between archaeological sites and Roman place-names is not always certain, the identification of the fort at Slack as Cambodunum is not universally accepted. As a result, while Cambodunum is often described as being located in or near Calderdale, its precise siting remains unresolved in academic literature.

The metropolitan district of Calderdale was created on 1 April 1974 under the Local Government Act 1972. It covered the area of eight former districts and part of a ninth, which were all abolished at the same time:

- Municipal Borough of Brighouse
- Elland Urban District
- County Borough of Halifax
- Hebden Royd Urban District
- Hepton Rural District
- Queensbury and Shelf Urban District (Shelf part only, Queensbury went to Bradford)
- Ripponden Urban District
- Sowerby Bridge Urban District
- Municipal Borough of Todmorden

The area of the new district broadly corresponded to the ancient extent of the parish of Halifax, though not exactly.

In 2022, Yorkshire Water built an emergency water pipeline from Calderdale to Ponden Reservoir in Haworth as Yorkshire experienced its driest period on record.

== Governance ==
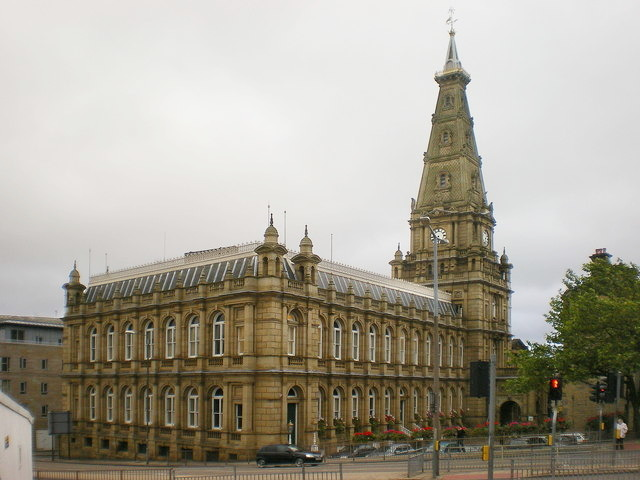
Halifax Town Hall

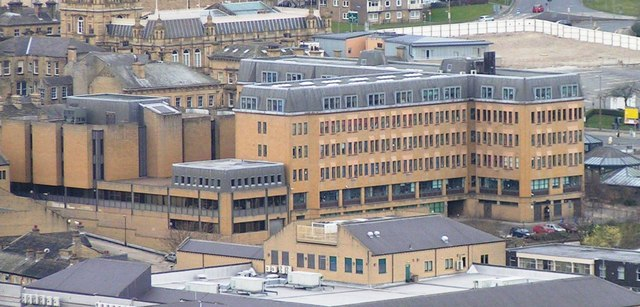
Northgate House in Halifax was the council's headquarters until sale in 2013

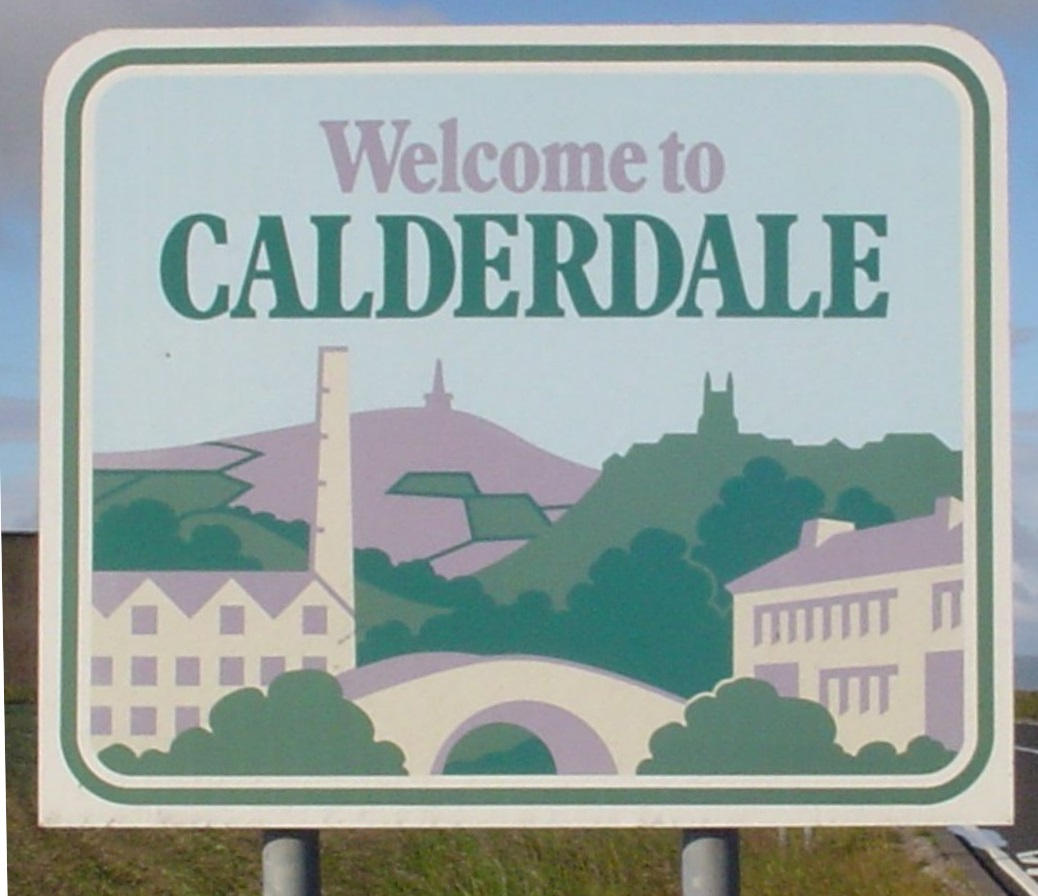
Welcome sign in Calderdale

The borough is divided into 17 wards, each of which is represented on Calderdale Metropolitan Borough Council by three councillors. Councillors are normally elected using the first-past-the-post system for four-year terms, with elections staggered so that only one councillor per ward is elected in any given year. Exceptions to this arrangement include by-elections and elections held following ward boundary changes.

== Demography ==
=== Ethnicity ===
The largest ethnic group within Calderdale at the 2011 census was White British at 86.7%, down from 90.8% in 2001. The next largest ethnic group are Pakistanis, comprising 6.8% of the population (4.9% in 2001).

In 2011, Christians comprised 60.6% of the borough's population. This was followed by those of no religion (30.2%) and Muslims (7.8%).

The 2021 census showed further changes in the borough, with the White British population declining slightly to 82.7% and the proportion of residents of Pakistani heritage increasing to 8.5%. Younger residents showed a higher level of ethnic diversity with 74.7% of Calderdale's population aged under 16 identifying as White British compared with 93.5% of the population over 65. Those holding no religion had risen to 42.0% of the population, now comprising a slightly higher proportion of residents than Christians (41.5%) and the Muslim population remaining relatively stable increasing to 9.5%. The large majority of Calderdale residents were born in England - falling slightly from 90.6% to 89.7% between 2011 and 2021.

Ethnic Group	1981 estimations		1991 census		2001 census		2011 census		2021 census	
Ethnic Group	Number	%	Number	%	Number	%	Number	%	Number	%
White: Total	187,572	96.4%	184,975	95.3%	178,981	93%	182,787		177,836	86%
White: British	–	–	–	–	174,775	90.8%	176,732		170,983	
White: Irish	–	–	–	–	2,082	1.1%	1,795		1,564	
White: Gypsy or Irish Traveller	–	–	–	–	–	–	80		136	
White: Roma	–	–	–	–	–	–	–	–	247	
White: Other	–	–	–	–	2,124	1.1%	4,180		4,906	
Asian or Asian British: Total	5,948	3.1%	8,230		11,237		16,875		21,726	10.5%
Asian or Asian British: Indian	405		532		814		1,130		1,861	
Asian or Asian British: Pakistani	4,829		6,487		9,442		13,904		17,637	
Asian or Asian British: Bangladeshi	255		335		300		574		681	
Asian or Asian British: Chinese	159		186		287		459		415	
Asian or Asian British: Other Asian	300		690		394		808		1,132	
Black or Black British: Total	534		653		437		899		1,439	
Black or Black British: Caribbean	234		281		259		320		400	
Black or Black British: African	72		82		128		479		847	
Black or Black British: Other Black	228		290		50		100		192	
Mixed: Total	–	–	–	–	1,546		2,797		4,027	
Mixed: White and Black Caribbean	–	–	–	–	613		1,097		1,348	
Mixed: White and Black African	–	–	–	–	96		247		372	
Mixed: White and Asian	–	–	–	–	547		907		1,458	
Mixed: Other Mixed	–	–	–	–	290		546		849	
Other: Total	421		531				468			
Other: Arab	–	–	–	–	–	–	111		327	
Other: Any other ethnic group	421		531		204		357		1,276	
Ethnic minority	6,823		9,025		13,424		21,039		28,795	
Total	194,395	100%	194,000	100%	192,405	100%	203,826	100%	206,631	100%

== Public services and facilities ==
=== Health ===
Calderdale is served by the local NHS through Calderdale & Huddersfield NHS Foundation Trust and South West Yorkshire Partnership NHS Foundation Trust. The borough has two hospitals and one hospice. The main hospital is Calderdale Royal Hospital, part of Calderdale & Huddersfield NHS Foundation Trust, located on the main route to Huddersfield in Salterhebble. It hosts specialist services including Calderdale’s accident and emergency department and the Calderdale Birth Centre. The hospital was built on the site of the former Halifax General Hospital and opened in 2001. Following the opening of the new hospital, the Royal Halifax Infirmary closed and its services were transferred to Calderdale Royal Hospital, along with services formerly provided at Northowram Hospital.

NHS ambulance services in the borough are provided by the Yorkshire Ambulance Service from stations in Halifax, Brighouse, and Todmorden. Overgate Hospice provides specialist palliative care services for adults in Calderdale.

Elland Hospital, Calderdale’s only private hospital, is located near the Calderdale Way. Formerly known as BUPA Elland Independent Hospital, it is now owned and operated by Classic Hospitals.

=== Police ===
Calderdale is served by West Yorkshire Police; whose Calderdale Division headquarters is at Halifax police station. Other police stations are located in Todmorden and at Brighouse, which reopened in 2009.

=== Fire and rescue ===
West Yorkshire Fire & Rescue covers Calderdale and it has five fire stations in the borough. These are located at Rastrick (Since 2015), King Cross (Halifax Fire Station), Mytholmroyd, Illingworth, and Todmorden.

=== Libraries ===
Calderdale Libraries provides services through 22 local library branches, including a central library in Halifax, and has a home library service and digital library service. In 2014, construction began on a new central library and archive building in Halifax, adjacent to the Piece Hall and the Square Chapel. The new Central Library and Archive officially opened in September 2017.

== Transport ==
Calderdale has seven operational railway stations: Brighouse, Halifax, Hebden Bridge, Mytholmroyd, Sowerby Bridge, Todmorden, and Walsden.

A new Elland railway station has been approved and is under development. Planning permission was granted in 2023, with construction scheduled to begin in 2024 and an original target opening date of December 2025.

Rail services in the borough are operated by Northern and Grand Central. Destinations served from stations in Calderdale include Bradford Interchange, Huddersfield, Leeds, York, Manchester Victoria, Blackpool North, Wigan North Western, Chester, Warrington Bank Quay, Hull, Preston, Burnley Manchester Road, and London King’s Cross.

== Education ==
Two selective schools in Calderdale jointly administer an 11+ admissions examination: The Crossley Heath School in Savile Park and North Halifax Grammar School in Illingworth.

Calderdale College is a further education college located on Francis Street in Halifax. In December 2006 it was announced that Calderdale College, in partnership with Leeds Metropolitan University, would open a new higher education institution in January 2007 called University Centre Calderdale.

== Media ==
In terms of television, Calderdale is served by BBC Yorkshire and ITV Yorkshire broadcasting from the Emley Moor transmitter.

Radio stations for the area:

- BBC Radio Leeds on 92.4 FM and 95.3 FM
- Heart Yorkshire on 106.2 FM and 107.6 FM
- Capital Yorkshire on 105.1 FM
- Hits Radio West Yorkshire on 102.5 FM
- Greatest Hits Radio West Yorkshire on 96.3 FM
- Phoenix Radio, a community based station that broadcast from Halifax on 96.7 FM.

== Sports ==
There are three operational public swimming pools in Calderdale, located in Todmorden, Brighouse and Sowerby Bridge. Halifax currently does not have a public swimming pool following the closure of North Bridge Leisure Centre in 2021, and plans are in progress to provide a replacement facility.

Other sports facilities in Calderdale include North Bridge Leisure Centre in Halifax (currently closed), Sowerby Bridge Swimming Pool, Brighouse Leisure Centre and Pool, Todmorden Swimming Pool, The Shay, home of FC Halifax Town, and Spring Hall Sports Ground in Halifax, which includes track and field facilities.

== Parishes ==
There are eight civil parishes in Calderdale, covering the western part of the borough. The eastern part of the borough, including Brighouse, Elland, Halifax, Shelf and Sowerby Bridge, is an unparished area. The two parish councils of Hebden Royd and Todmorden take the style "town council".

- Blackshaw
- Erringden
- Hebden Royd (town)
- Heptonstall
- Ripponden
- Stainland and District
- Todmorden (town)
- Wadsworth

== Settlements ==
The borough contains numerous settlements, including:

- Bailiff Bridge, Bank Top, Barkisland, Blackley, Blackshaw Head, Boothtown, Boulderclough, Bradshaw
- Chiserley, Clifton, Colden, Coley, Copley, Cornholme, Cottonstones, Cragg Vale
- Eastwood
- Fountain Head, Friendly
- Gauxholme, Greetland
- Heptonstall, Highroadwell, Hipperholme, Holmfield, Holywell Green, Hove Edge, Hubberton
- Illingworth
- Jagger Green
- Kebroyd, King Cross, Krumlin
- Lee Mount, Lightcliffe, Luddenden, Luddendenfoot, Lumbutts, Lydgate
- Mankinholes, Midgley, Mill Bank, Mixenden, Mount Tabor, Mytholm, Mytholmroyd
- Norland Town, Northowram, Norton Tower, Norwood Green
- Ogden, Old Lindley, Old Town, Ovenden
- Peckett Well, Pellon, Portsmouth, Pye Nest
- Rastrick, Ripponden, Rishworth
- Salterhebble, Savile Park, Shelf, Skircoat Green, Siddal, Slack, Southowram, Sowerby, Sowood, Soyland, Stainland, Stone Chair, Stump Cross
- Triangle
- Upper Edge
- Wainstalls, Walsden, Warland, Warley Town, West Vale, Wholestone Hill, Wheatley

== Coat of arms ==
Coat of arms of Calderdale
Notes Granted on 1 November 1977. Crest On a Wreath Argent and Vert out of a Mural Crown a Rose Tree of nine branches proper each terminating in a Rose Argent barbed and seeded proper. Escutcheon Vert a Paschal Lamb proper supporting over the shoulder a Cross Staff Or flying therefrom a forked Pennon of St. George between in chief a Bar wavy Argent charged with a Barruret wavy Azure and in base a Rose Argent barbed and seeded proper. Supporters On either side a Lion Or gorged with a collar wavy Azure and holding aloft in the interior forepaw a Crescent Sable. Motto Industria, Arte, Prudentia (By industry, skill and foresight.)

Calderdale Metropolitan Borough Council was granted a coat of arms in 1977. The Paschal lamb is the emblem of John the Baptist, the patron saint of wool workers. It was shown on the former arms of Halifax. The green and blue wavy line of the shield symbolises the River Calder and Calder Valley. The white rose is for Yorkshire. The crest shows a rose bush with nine white flowers representing the nine former authorities that now comprise the Calderdale district. The bush is shown growing out of a mural crown, a common feature in municipal arms. The lion supporters are taken from the arms of Halifax and also for England. A lion also featured on the shield of the arms of Brighouse. The black crescents, also from the arms of Brighouse, are featured on the arms of the Brighouse family. The blue wave around each lion's collar is from the arms of Todmorden and represents the Calder again. The motto, Industria arte prundentia, is Latin for 'Industry, skill, and foresight'.

== Freedom of the Borough ==
The following people and military units have received the Freedom of the Borough of Calderdale.

=== Individuals ===
- Hannah Cockroft: 13 September 2012.
- Sally Wainwright: 12 March 2020.

=== Military units ===
- The Duke of Wellington's Regiment: 27 July 2002.
