= Musical road =

Road producing a musical tune when driving over it

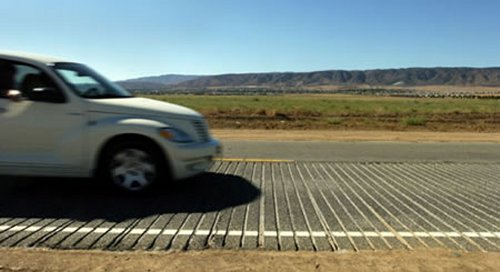
Musical Road in California

A musical road is a road, or section of a road, which when driven over causes a tactile vibration and audible rumbling that can be felt through the wheels and body of the vehicle. This rumbling is heard within the car as well as the surrounding area, in the form of a melody. Musical roads are known to exist in Saudi Arabia, Hungary, Japan, South Korea, Spain, India, the United States, China, Iran, Taiwan, Indonesia, the United Arab Emirates, Argentina, Belarus, Russia and Turkey. In the past, they could be found in France, Denmark and the Netherlands as well.

Each note is produced by varying the spacing of strips in, or on, the road. For example, an E note requires a frequency of around 330 vibrations a second. Therefore, strips 2.4 in (61 mm) apart will produce an E note in a vehicle travelling at 45 mph (72 km/h).

== History ==
Long before musical roads were being constructed, an earlier concept known as a rumble strip, were used since the 1950s to warn inattentive drivers of potential danger. The earliest known rumble strips were built in 1952 on the north and south lanes of the Garden State Parkway in New Jersey. They consisted of three-foot strips of corrugated concrete that would produce a distinct humming sound when driven over, and also serve as reflectors for increased visibility. Later on, rolled-in strips on asphalt shoulders and formed-in strips on concrete shoulders were two of the earlier designs used in installing shoulder rumble strips by a number of U.S. states. A major limitation was that they had to be installed with new pavement. There were also difficulties in consistently obtaining the desired shape. In the 1980s, the Pennsylvania Turnpike Commission developed a milled-in rumble strip design that could be installed on existing pavement. A series of trials led to a preferred design of ½ inch deep and 7 inches by 16 inches, producing tire vibration and noise with much greater alerting capacity than the rolled-in installation. Specified dimensions could also be produced more consistently. Subsequently, many other U.S. states began to use this milled-in design because of its effectiveness and ease of installation. In the 1990s, several U.S. state transportation agencies and toll road authorities installed the milled-in shoulder rumble design pioneered in Pennsylvania, mostly on rural freeways and expressways.

The first known musical road, the Asfaltofon (English: Asphaltophone), was created in October 1995 in Gylling, Denmark, by Steen Krarup Jensen and Jakob Freud-Magnus, two Danish artists. The Asphaltophone was made from a series of raised pavement markers, similar to Botts' dots, spaced out at intermittent intervals so that as a vehicle passed over the markers, the vibrations caused by the wheels could be heard inside the car. The song played was an arpeggio in the key of F major. The second musical road was constructed in 2000 in Villepinte, Seine-Saint-Denis, France. Allegedly, the road was paved over just two years later, but some assert that the musical tones can still be heard while driving on it. Japan gained momentum in the realm of musical roads when, in 2007, Shizuo Shinoda unintentionally etched markings into a road with a bulldozer, discovering that they could produce distinct musical tones when driven over. Engineers in Sapporo, who had previously explored the use of infra-red light for detecting hazardous road conditions, embarked on further research into the development of musical roads. Presently, Japan boasts at least thirty musical roads, featuring tunes like the theme from the anime Neon Genesis Evangelion and "Always with Me" from the film Spirited Away. These roads are predominantly created for tourism purposes.

Nevertheless, several countries, including Indonesia, South Korea, and China, have implemented musical roads with a focus on safety. The Indonesian road, intriguingly designed to reduce traffic accidents, plays the familiar Happy Birthday song. The auditory stimulation helps keep drivers alert. Often, the songs on these roads can be properly heard only when driving at the correct, consistent speed. Lin Zhong, the Chinese general manager of the architecture company responsible for many of these roads in China, noted that this characteristic encourages people to maintain a constant speed limit to enjoy the musical effect. Various musical roads in China play the national anthem, as well as the overture from "Carmen" and "Ode to Joy." In 2022, the most recent addition to musical roads played the song "Without the Communist Party, There Would Be No New China." As previously mentioned, Lancaster's musical road, established in 2008, holds the distinction of being the first-ever musical road in the United States.

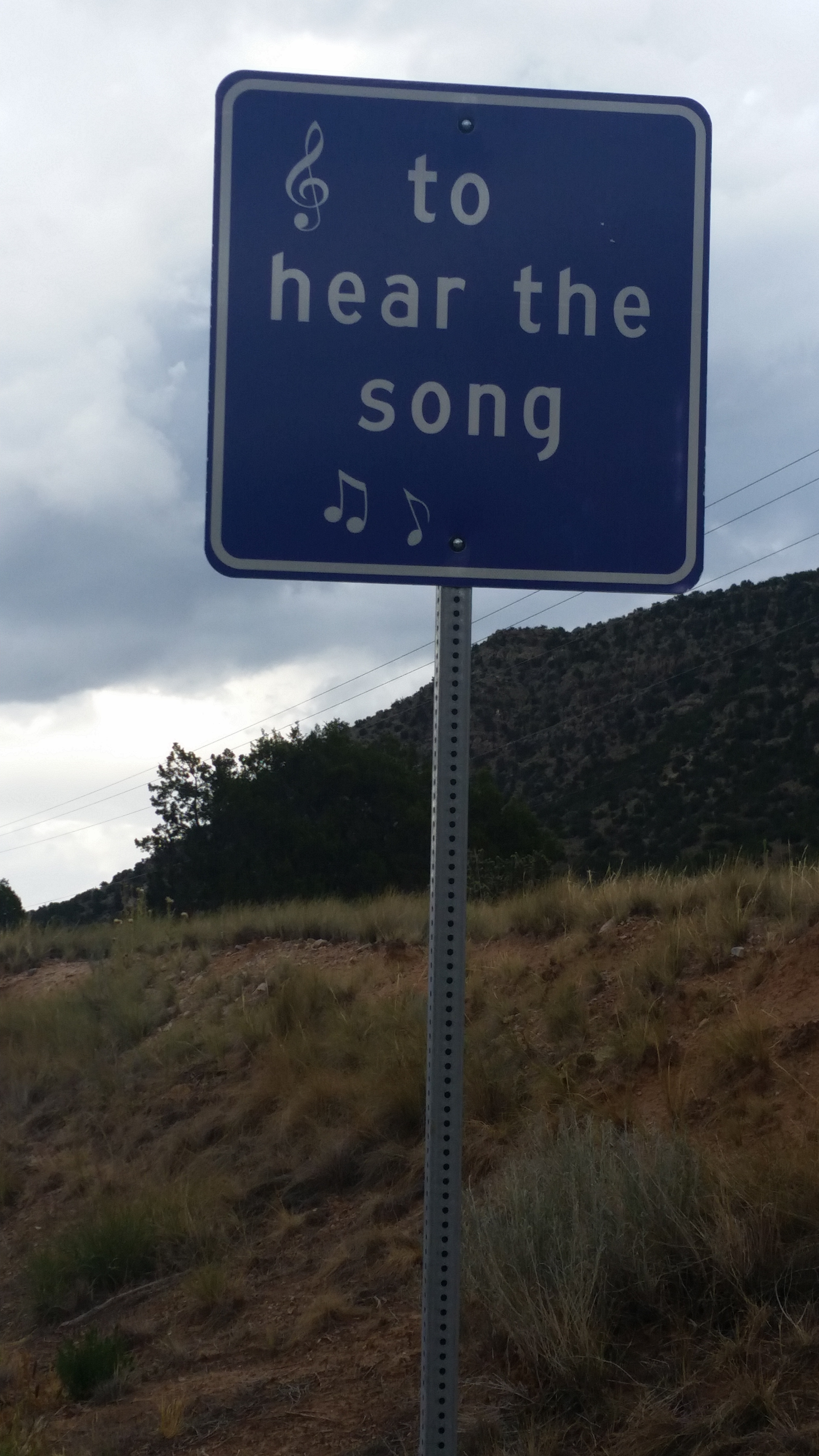
Sign next to the Tijeras Musical Road

In October 2014, a musical road in Tijeras, New Mexico, was created, featuring "America the Beautiful" on a two-lane stretch of U.S. Route 66. Some time later the road had faded, and there are no plans by the Department of Transportation to restore it due to the associated high costs. The third musical road in the United States, located at Auburn University in Alabama, plays the first seven notes of their college's fight song, "War Eagle." The most recent addition to the world of musical roads was established in the United Arab Emirates in January 2023, with ongoing testing and development to play the country's national anthem.

8 new musical roads are being installed along U.S. Route 66 in the US in time for the centenary of the road in 2026. Route 66 Musical Roads LLC are a US company developing this project and other stretches of musical highway for America's 250th celebration, also in 2026.

The Route 66 Musical Road project has been certified by the Route 66 Centennial Commission as an official project to celebrate the 100th birthday of the historic road.

== By country ==
=== Argentina ===
In 2021, Argentina installed a musical road along Kilometer 1449 of National Route 237, called "The piano of Kilometer 1449," in Piedra del Águila between Neuquén and Bariloche. It is the first musical road in South America. The song played is the first ten notes of "La Cucaracha," but the fourth, ninth and tenth notes are out-of-key. Like the musical road in Denmark, it is also called an "asphaltophone," or "asfaltófono" in Spanish. Similarly to the musical roads in Hungary and New Mexico in the United States, the musical segments are only on the side of the road as opposed to covering the entire width of the road. It was implemented both to avoid accidents caused by fatigue and to increase tourism.

=== Belarus ===
In 2024, transverse red lines made of plastic intended to produce sounds resembling the melody of the song "Belarus" by the group "Pesnyary" were installed on the right side of a section of road leading from Babruysk to the Gomel Region of Belarus, at the entrance of the region. The lines were implemented on the road to prevent drivers from falling asleep and driving into ditches on the road.

=== China ===
A 300-meter stretch of asphalt road in Beijing's south-western Fengtai District in the Qianlingshan Mountain Scenic Area has been made into a singing road playing the tune "Ode to the Motherland", as long as drivers follow the speed limit of 40 km/h. Construction was completed in 2016. "We have small grooves built into the road surface, positioned apart with different sizes of gap according to the melody of the song. These 'rumble strips' cause the car tires to play music and then make a singing road," said Lin Zhong, general manager of Beijing Luxin Dacheng landscape architecture company. "Our first idea is to get cars moving at a constant speed. Because only in that way can you enjoy good musical effect. We use it as a reminder of speed limit," added Lin.

Multiple other musical roads in China exist, including one at a nature reserve in Henan that plays the national anthem and "Mo Li Hua", and another near Yangma Dao in Yantai which plays the overture from Carmen and "Ode to Joy." One song is paved into each side of the road at both locations so drivers can experience a song both traveling one way and the other way.

In June 2021, a 587-meter portion of G108 in Xiayunling Township, Fangshan, Beijing, was made into a musical road which plays the tune of "Without the Communist Party, There Would Be No New China". Xiayunling was the birthplace of this song.

=== Denmark ===
The first known musical road, the Asfaltofon (English: Asphaltophone), was created in October 1995 in Gylling, Denmark, by Steen Krarup Jensen and Jakob Freud-Magnus, two Danish artists. The Asphaltophone was made from a series of raised pavement markers, similar to Botts' dots, spaced out at intermittent intervals so that as a vehicle passed over the markers, the vibrations caused by the wheels could be heard inside the car. The song played was an arpeggio in the key of F major.

=== France ===
In 2000, a musical road with a 28-note melody composed by Gaellic Guillerm was built in the suburb of Villepinte, Seine-Saint-Denis, France. It was located on Boulevard Laurent and Danielle Casanova and was supposedly paved over in 2002. However, as of 2006, subsequent visits to the site of this musical road claimed that the song could still be heard faintly.

=== Hungary ===
67-es út on Road 67, Hungary

In 2019, Hungary installed a musical road in memoriam of László Bódi (better known by his stage name Cipő), lead singer from the band Republic. When going on the side of the road, an approximately 30-second snippet of their song 67-es út (Road 67) plays. It is located at 46.530547°N 17.817368°E on Road 67 between Mernyeszentmiklós and Mernye, in the southbound direction.

A second musical road was built in Hungary in 2022, this time on Road 37 in Szerencs. The project was completed in April 2023. This musical road is 513 meters long and plays a well-known Hungarian children's folk song called "The Grapes are Ripening."

In September 2024, a 550-meter-long musical road was completed on Highway 21. As drivers travel over it, they can hear the iconic song "Nélküled" by the band Ismerős Arcok. This installation serves as a cultural and auditory landmark for the region.

=== India ===
On 11 February 2026, Mumbai got India's first musical road. A 500-metre stretch on the northbound lane of the Chhatrapati Sambhaji Maharaj Coastal Road was fitted with 66 "music strips" that play tunes as vehicles drive over them at a specific speed of 80 km/h. For commuters travelling from Nariman Point to Worli, this 500-metre stretch hums with the notes of the song Jai Ho.

=== Indonesia ===
In 2019, Indonesia installed a musical road along the Ngawi–Kertosono section of the Solo–Kertosono Toll Road in Java. The song played is the first six notes of "Happy Birthday to You," but the fifth note is off-key by a half-step. It was installed to reduce the number of traffic accidents, and the song was chosen because it is familiar to the community.

=== Japan ===
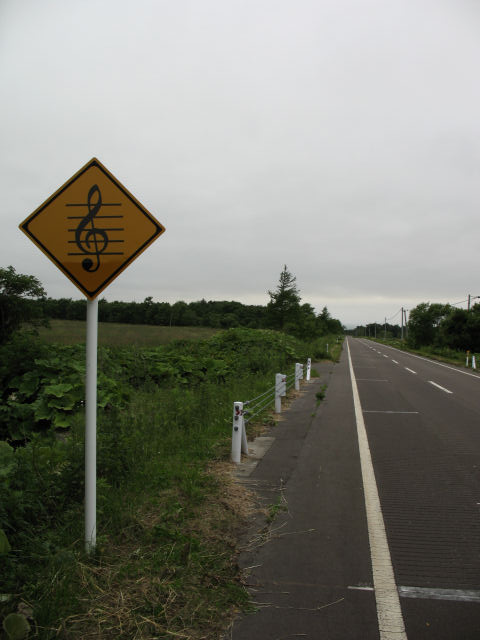
Melody Road in Shibetsu, Hokkaido, Japan, which is polyphonic

In Japan, Shizuo Shinoda accidentally scraped some markings into a road with a bulldozer. When he drove over them, he realized that it was possible to create tunes depending on the depth and spacing of the grooves. In 2007, the Hokkaido National Industrial Research Institute, which had previously worked on a system using infra-red lights to detect dangerous road surfaces, refined Shinoda's designs to create the Melody Road. They used the same concept of cutting grooves into the concrete at specific intervals and found the closer the grooves are, the higher the pitch of the sound; while grooves which are spaced farther apart create lower pitched sounds.

There are multiple permanently paved 250-meter (820 ft) Melody Roads sections throughout Japan. The first ones built included one in Hokkaido in Shibetsu, Nemuro which plays the "Shiretoko Love Song" on the site of where Shinoda's first bulldozer scrapings were, another in the town of Kimino in Wakayama Prefecture where a car can produce the Japanese ballad "Miagete goran yoru no hoshi wo" by Kyu Sakamoto, two in Shizuoka Prefecture on the ascending and descending drive to Mount Fuji, and a fourth in the village of Katashina in Gunma, which consists of 2,559 grooves cut into a 175-meter (574 ft) stretch of existing roadway and produces the tune of "Memories of Summer". A 320-meter (1050 ft) stretch of the Ashinoko Skyline in Hakone plays "A Cruel Angel's Thesis", the theme song from the anime Neon Genesis Evangelion, when driven over at 40 km/h. Yet another can be found on the road between Nakanojo town and Shima Onsen, which plays "Always With Me" (Japanese title: いつも何度でも, Itsumo nando demo) from the feature animation Spirited Away.

The roads work by creating sequences of variable width groove intervals to create specific low and high frequency vibrations. Some of these roads, such as one in Okinawa that produces the Japanese folk song "Futami Jowa", as well as one in Hiroshima Prefecture, are polyphonic, with different sequences of rumble strips for the left and right tires so that a melody and harmony can be heard. As of 2016, there are over 30 Melody Roads in Japan.

=== Netherlands ===
A singing road had been installed near the village of Jelsum in Friesland. The Friesland provincial anthem ("De Alde Friezen") would play if drivers obeyed the speed limits, otherwise the song would play off-key. After complaints from villagers, the singing road was removed.

=== Russia ===
In 2024, a musical marking of transverse noise bands with a musical effect appeared at kilometer 653 of the M-11 "Neva" highway. Driving along the side of the road at the permitted speed, motorists can hear a fragment of the composition "Kalinka". It was implemented with the help of the immersion technology laboratory on specially developed software, which made it possible to translate strokes into notes and bring musical markup to life. It was reported to be the first musical road developed entirely by a computer program that calculate the necessary parameters for drawing marking lines on a road to produce specific notes.

=== South Korea ===
The Singing Road can be found close to Anyang, Gyeonggi, and was created using grooves cut into the ground, similar to the Japanese Melody Roads. Unlike the Japanese roads, however, which were designed to attract tourists, the Singing Road is intended to help motorists stay alert and awake – 68% of traffic accidents in South Korea are caused by inattentive, sleeping or speeding drivers. The tune played is "Mary Had a Little Lamb" and took four days to construct. It is likely that the song was chosen because the road leads to an airport - in Korean, the melody of "Mary Had a Little Lamb" is known as "Airplane," with lyrics describing an airplane flying. As of 2022, however, it was paved over and the song can no longer be heard.

As of 2022, there are five singing roads in South Korea. There were formerly six, but the first was paved over. The second one, built at an unknown date, plays a traditional folk tune called "Mountain Wind, River Wind" for guests exiting the ski resort Kangwon Land. The third is located on the way from Osan to Chinhae and plays a song called "Bicycle."

The fourth was constructed in 2019 and plays the first verse of "Twinkle, Twinkle, Little Star". It was constructed inside of the Inje-Yangyang Tunnel on the Seoul–Yangyang Expressway, the longest tunnel in Korea. The fifth is located on the Donghae Expressway inside of a tunnel and plays a well-known Korean children's folk song called "Cheer Up, Dad."

=== Spain ===
In 2021, near the town of Parla, on a connecting ramp of the R-4 toll motorway, rumble strips were installed playing a fragment of Isaac Albéniz's song "Asturias". These strips are approximately 158 meters long. They were briefly featured in an episode on the RTVE program "Seguridad Vital". According to the program, these rumble strips are a pilot project to combat drowsiness while driving. Their use requires drivers to pull onto the shoulder just to play the song.

=== Turkey ===
In May 2025, a musical road was installed on the Nallıhan-Beypazarı state road in Nallıhan, Ankara. When vehicles pass at the posted speed, it plays Wolfgang Amadeus Mozart's Rondo alla turca (often called the "Turkish March").. A second musical road was installed on the Ankara-Eskişehir state road near the Sivrihisar exit (Kertek area) and plays the same tune.. In October 2025, a musical road on the Edirne-Kırklareli road near Söğütlüdere village was reported to play the Mehter march.. Another musical road was installed on the Trabzon-Maçka state road (Su Kenarı area), which plays "Ceddin Deden".

=== United Arab Emirates ===
On 13 January 2023, a musical road was built in the city of Al Ain in the United Arab Emirates, playing the national anthem of the country, "Ishy Bilady," when driven over. However, it is being used as an experiment; the strips on the road are temporary and will be removed in the future to study the possibility of a better implementation.

In Fujairah in the United Arab Emirates, a 750-meter (0.46 mile) section of Sheikh Khalifa Street, opened in 2025, plays Beethoven's Ode to Joy.

=== United States ===
Video of Civic Musical Road in Lancaster, California in 2013

The Civic Musical Road was built on Avenue K in Lancaster, California, on 5 September 2008. Covering a quarter-mile stretch of road between 60th Street West and 70th Street West, the Civic Musical Road used grooves cut into the asphalt to replicate part of the finale of the William Tell Overture. It was paved over on 23 September after nearby residents complained to the city council about noise levels. After further complaints from city residents about its removal, work began to re-create it on 15 October 2008 on Avenue G between 30th Street West and 40th Street West—this time, two miles away from any residence. This road is named after the Honda Civic. It opened two days later. The new section on Avenue G is only in the far left lane of the westbound side of the road. The road appears in Honda Civic commercials. The rhythm is recognizable, but the intervals are so far apart that the melody bears only a slight resemblance to the William Tell Overture, regardless of the car speed. It is likely the designers made a systematic miscalculation not to include the width of the groove in the relevant width of the spacing plus groove. This failure was made on both Avenue K and Avenue G.

In October 2014, the village of Tijeras, New Mexico, installed a musical road on a two-lane stretch of U.S. Route 66 which plays "America the Beautiful", when a vehicle drives over it at 45 mph. This highway is labelled NM 333, between Miles 4 and 5, eastbound. Funded by the National Geographic Society, the project was coordinated with the New Mexico Department of Transportation which described the project as a way to get drivers to slow down, "and to bring a little excitement to an otherwise monotonous highway." By 2020, however, the tune was fading and most of the ridges were even paved over. A spokesperson for New Mexico's Department of Transportation said, "...there are no plans to restore the musical highway. The cost is outrageous, and they have since restored portions of the roadway and removed all of the signs. Unfortunately, this was part of a previous administration and never set in stone to keep up with the maintenance of this singing highway."

In October 2019, Tim Arnold, an alumnus of Auburn University's College of Engineering, created and installed a musical road that plays the first seven notes of the Auburn Tigers fight song, "War Eagle". Inspired by previous musical roads, the short section of South Donahue Drive in Auburn, Alabama, has been dubbed "War Eagle Road" and was created with a revolutionary process utilizing a surface-application material which does not damage the road. Working with support from Auburn University and the National Center for Asphalt Technology, Arnold developed the War Eagle Road to be a work of public art welcoming fans and rivals as they approach campus. The project was approved by the Office of the University Architect within Facilities Management and completed to coordinate with the final three home games of the Auburn Tigers football season. The musical road has enjoyed a positive public reaction and seems to be welcomed as a permanent fixture.

The fourth musical road in the United States was opened in Palmdale, California on 6 November 2023. This specific location was selected in honor of R. Lee Ermey, and plays 30 seconds of the "Marine’s Hymn". It was built in honor of the 248th anniversary of the United States Marine Corps.

== See also ==
- Rumble strip
- Train melody
- Walt Disney World singing runway
