= Simon Jensen =

Danish jazz flutist, composer and poet (born 1973)

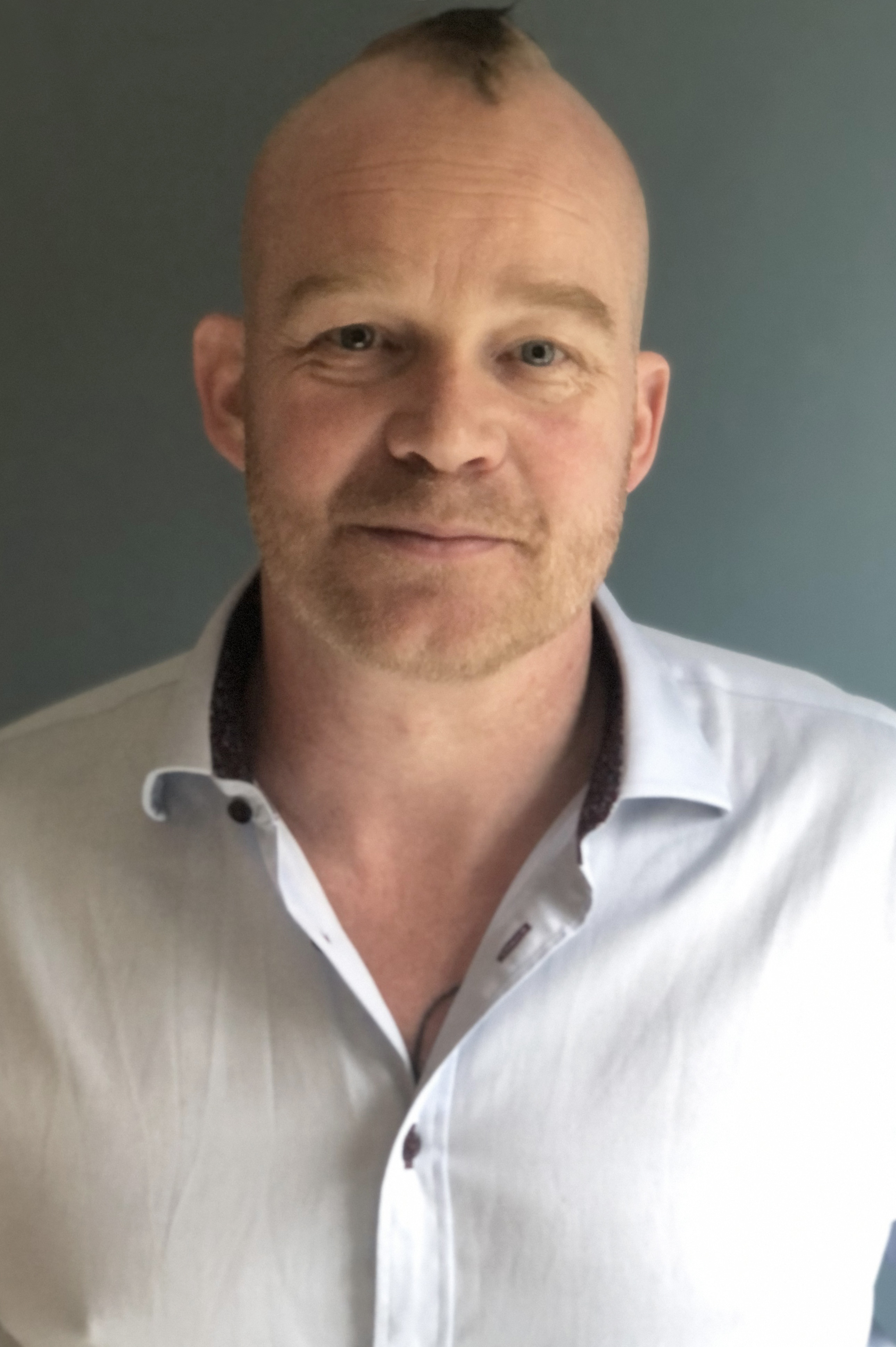
- Simon Jensen, March 2021

Background information
- Also known as: Simon K. Jensen
- Born: Simon Krarup Jensen; February 3, 1973 (age 53); Copenhagen, Denmark
- Genres: Jazz, Folk-rock, Poetry
- Occupations: Musician, composer
- Instrument: Flute
- Years active: 1996–
- Label: Various
- Website: Official website

Simon K. Jensen (born 3 February 1973) is a Danish jazz flutist, composer and poet. He is active in several genres and leads his own band, Simon Jensen Band. He lives in Gothenburg, Sweden.

Jensen was born in Copenhagen, the son of artist Steen Krarup Jensen. Between 1997 and 2002, he was a permanent member of the Swedish prog rock band Grovjobb, and this band made three albums during that period. In January 2005 the album All You Can Eat with Simon Jensen Band was released on Blue Beat Productions.

Jensen made his literary debut in 2009 with a collection of poems called Skärmen (in Swedish). In December 2011, his second collection of poems, Fingret, was published.

== Bibliography ==
- Skärmen, ISBN 978-91-976440-9-9 (Trombone, 2009)
- Fingret, ISBN 978-91-978243-4-7 (Trombone, 2011)
- C++ på riktigt, ISBN 978-91-985701-0-6 (Göteborgs Tekniska College, 2019)

== Discography ==
- Landet Leverpastej, Grovjobb (Garageland Records, 1998)
- Vättarnas Fest, Grovjobb (Garageland Records, 2000)
- Under Solen Lyser Solen, Grovjobb (Garageland Records, 2002)
- All You Can Eat, Simon Jensen Band (Blue Beat Productions, 2005)
- Eileen Live at FolkFest July 2010, Eileen (Eileen Events, 2010)

== Other works ==
- The dice game Inverted Dice (OffCircle, 2015)

== Sources ==
- Simon Jensen's Official website
- Review off the album All You Can Eat
- Review of Skärmen (in Swedish)
