= Rumble strip =

Road safety feature

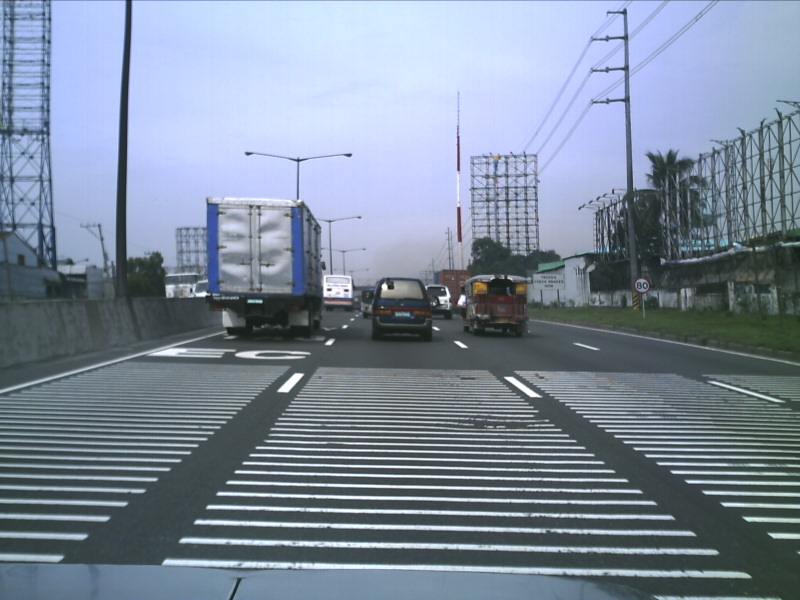
The North Luzon Expressway's raised plastic transverse rumble strips approaching Balintawak Toll Barrier, Philippines

Rumble strips (also known as sleeper lines or alert strips) are a traffic calming feature to alert inattentive drivers of potential danger, by causing a tactile vibration and audible rumbling transmitted through a vehicle's wheels into its interior. A rumble strip is applied along the direction of travel following an edgeline or centerline, to alert drivers when they drift from their lane. Rumble strips may also be installed in a series across the direction of travel, to warn drivers of a stop or slowdown ahead, or of an approaching danger spot.

In favorable circumstances, rumble strips are effective (and cost-effective) at reducing accidents due to inattention. The effectiveness of shoulder rumble strips is largely dependent on a wide and stable road shoulder for a recovery, but there are several other less obvious factors that engineers consider during design.

== Other names ==
Rumble strips are also known as audible lines, sleepy bumps, wake up calls, ruffles strips (named after the potato chips), speed regulating strips (in Singapore) growlers, drift lines, waker-uppers, and drunk bumps.

== Placement ==
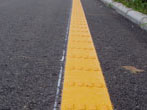
Convex road lines, raised thermoplastic pavement lines

Rumble strips are divided into transverse rumble strips, shoulder rumble strips, and centerline rumble strips, depending on how they are used.

Transverse rumble strips are placed in the travel lanes where most if not all vehicles will cross them. They are used to alert the driver of an upcoming intersection, toll booth or similar hazard. They may cross the entire road from shoulder to shoulder, or they may only be in the wheel paths. Portable rumble strips, also called Andreas strips, can be used to alert traffic to upcoming lane closures or road works to prevent collision with signage and barriers.

Shoulder and centerline rumble strips are used to reduce lane departure crashes. Centerline rumble strips are used on undivided highways to reduce cross-over incidents and resultant head-on collisions. Shoulder rumble strips are used primarily to reduce run-off-road collisions. They alert distracted or drowsy drivers that they are leaving the roadway or crossing the centerline of the road. In this application, they are narrower and outside of the wheelpaths.

== Installation ==
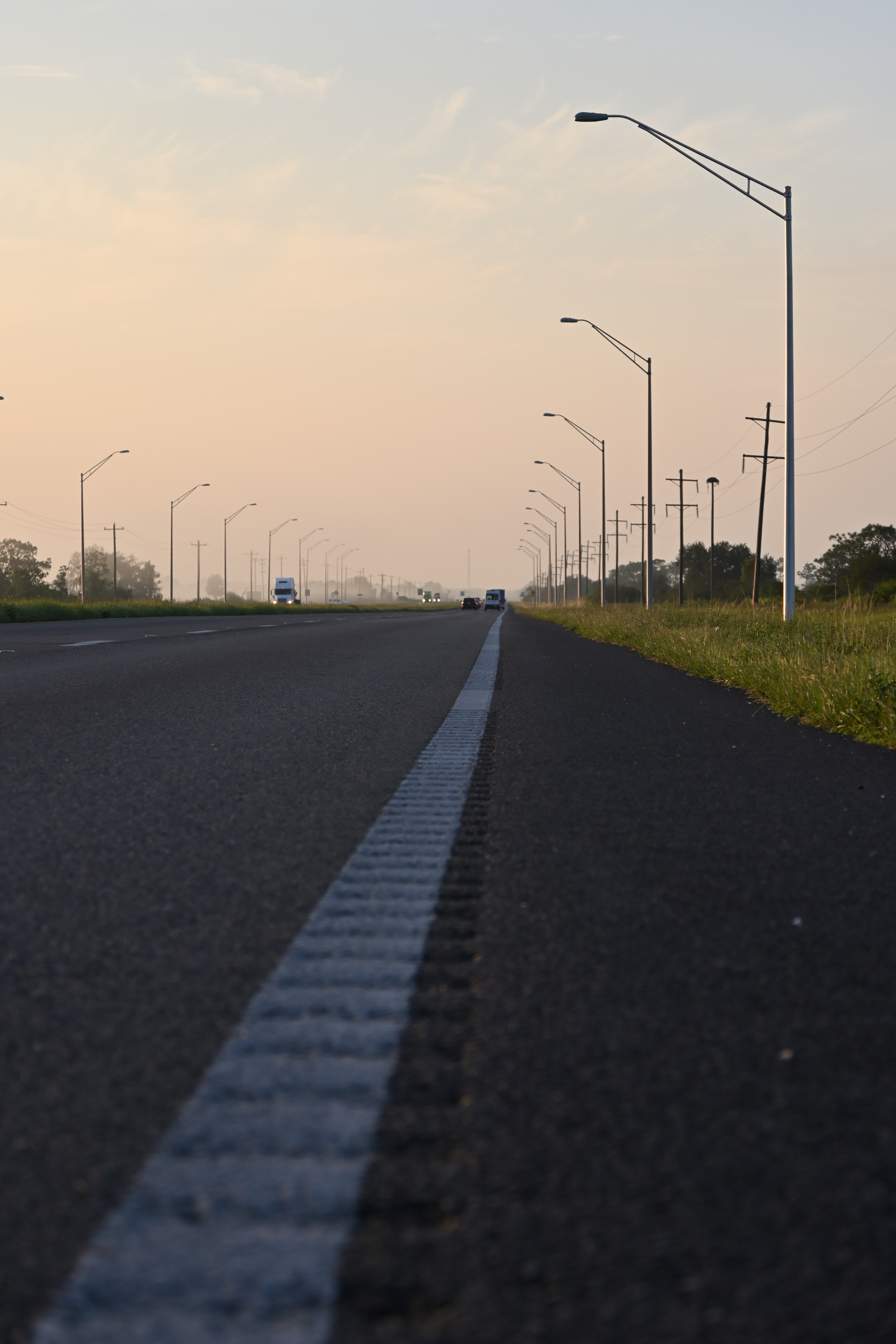
Rolled-in rumble strip marking the shoulder of a rural US road

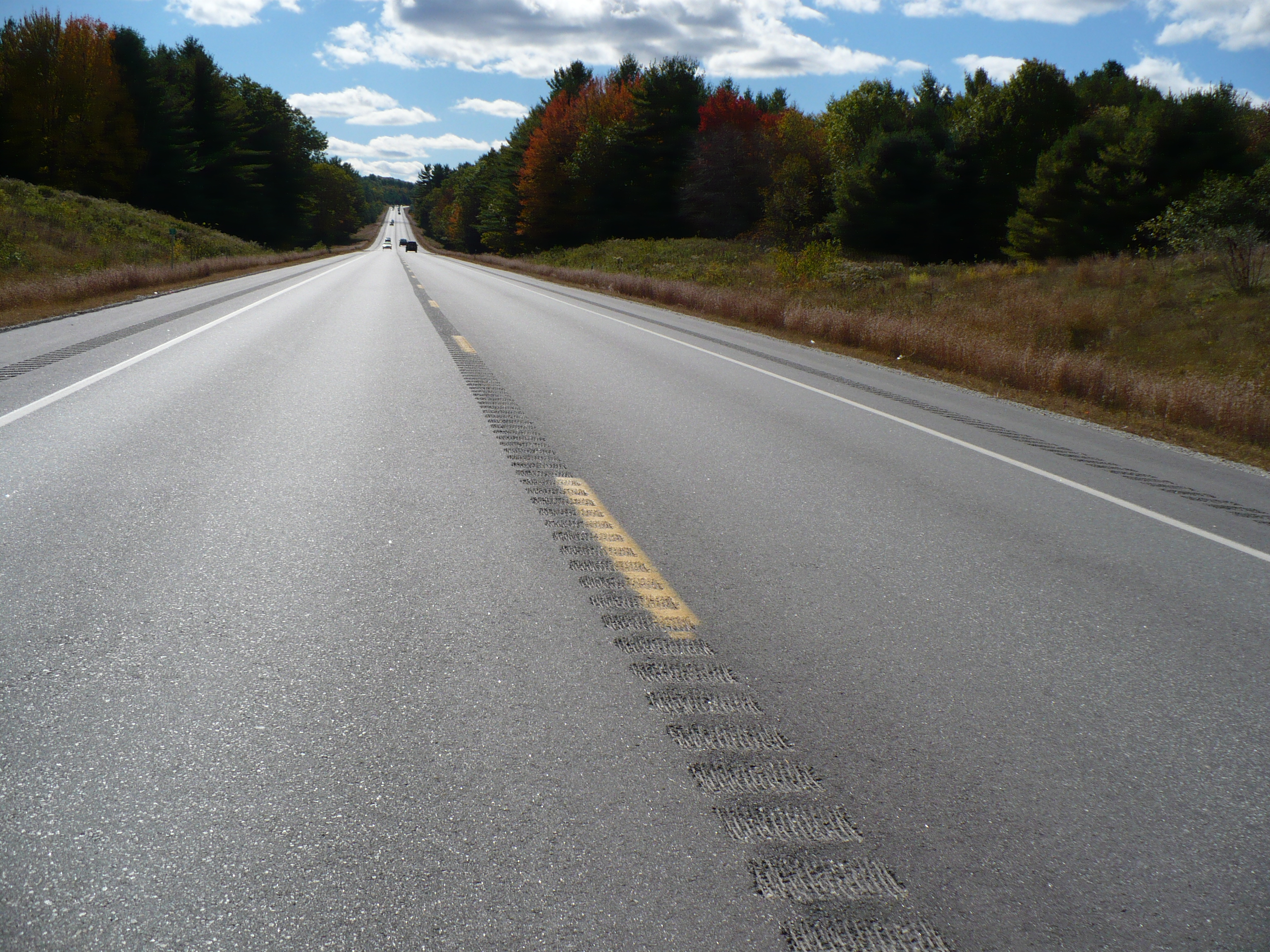
Milled-in rumble strip on the centerline of a rural US road

There are several different ways to install rumble strips:

- Rolled-in, applied to newly laid asphalt pavement while it is still warm and moldable.
- Milled-in, applied to existing hardened asphalt or concrete roads.
- Formed, a corrugated form is pressed into fresh concrete.
- Raised plastic or ceramic units, fastened to asphalt or concrete pavement and often with a reflector built into the edge. Botts' dots are a common installation.
- Profiled thermoplastic markings are created by fusing thermoplastic to the pavement and create alternating elevation and recession pattern. This can be done as inverted-profile markings or raised-profile markings. Inverted-profile markings are created by pressing a cog rolling over the markings while they are wet to make them corrugated. Raised-profile markings are created by extruding extra thickness of thermoplastic at a specific interval to create bumps. Raised-profile markings are sometimes known as convex traffic lines.
- "Smart car" virtual shoulder rumble strips, referred to as a lane departure warning system, are increasingly available on personal vehicles and commercial trucks. The alarm is similar to the sound produced when striking rumble strips.
- "Smart car" virtual transverse rumble strips to prevent cross-path crashes at intersections are being developed.

Surface-mount raised pavement reflectors are easily scraped off by the blade on snowplows, and thus are not practical in many locations in the United States and Canada.

Rumble strips combined with pavement markings are sometimes called rumble stripes. They may be formed with raised textured plastic pavement markers, or they may use conventional pavement marking materials sprayed onto milled rumble strips. Rumble stripes have markedly increased visibility in wet nighttime conditions, when conventional markings on flat surfaces can be difficult to see.

== History ==
An early use of this construction was in 1943 on New Jersey's Route 6 near Great Notch. The scoring in the pavement—at the dual-lane divisions—reflected drivers' headlights, while "the resonant whine or roar coming off the ridges as the vehicle's tires rolled over the strip let the motorist know he was getting out of his traffic lane." With the "singing lane" safety benefit recognized for nearly a decade, the New Jersey chair of its Highway Authority, Ransford J. Abbott, mandated pavement-edge scoring for the Garden State Parkway in the early 1950s.

Rumble strips were first implemented on the Garden State Parkway in New Jersey in 1952.

Initially, shoulder rumble strip installation focused on freeways using rolled-in rumble strips of different designs using a modified roller on a pavement rolling machines. Later, paving contractors modified pavement rolling machines to mill rumble strips into existing hardened asphalt pavement. Specifically designed commercially available machines followed. The development of ceramic and plastic raised systems enabled installation on concrete pavement highways, and the smaller footprint was better suited for the dashed centerline. "Virtual" rumble strips followed.

As rumble strips produce audible rumbling in specific audio frequencies based on the spacing of the grooves and the speed of the automobile, they have been used to create novel musical roads. These are also known as "singing shoulders".

Rumble strip installation is widespread, and in some cases controversial. Residents near urban freeways complain of noise at night as vehicles change lanes; or when vehicles strike the transverse rumble strips. The encroachment of shoulder rumble strips onto highways with narrow shoulders may create a hazard for cyclists. US and Canadian guidelines have minimum standards for installation on known cycling routes. In 2009, in Michigan, the Amish claimed that the shoulder rumble strips were dangerous for horse-drawn carriages, and successfully lobbied to have them paved over. In 2010, Kansas has considered removing shoulder rumble strips from an interstate highway to allow buses to travel on the shoulder during periods of traffic congestion.

== Accident and driver dynamics ==
=== On-road and run-off-road accidents ===
Single-vehicle crashes are classified into two groups: run-off-road (ROR), and on-road (OR) crashes in which the vehicle remains on the road after the crash. ROR crashes can account for up to 70% of the fatal single-vehicle crashes.

ROR crashes are due to inattention, speeding, traction loss, overreaction, crash avoidance, and mechanical failure. Rumble strips only prevent ROR crashes due to inattention.

Research indicates that 47% of RORs exited the highway to the left; while 53% exited the highway to the right (in the USA where driving is on the right-hand-side of the road).

=== Inattentive driving ===
A US Federal Highway Administration (FHWA) sponsored study stated that driver inattention comes in many forms, including distraction, daydreaming/competing thoughts, fatigue/drowsiness, and alcohol/drug impairment. Early evening low alcohol intake also worsens sleepiness-related driving impairment.

In a 2008 survey in the US, 33% of fatally injured drivers tested were found to be legally impaired (BAC > 80 mg %), and an additional 5% were found to have a legal amount of alcohol in their bodies. Canada has similar statistics.

=== Migration of accidents ===
Studies support the hypothesis that some crashes are not prevented, but merely "migrated" or displaced from vehicle to vehicle, season to season, or location to location (e.g., further downstream of rumble strips on the highway system), and that such crashes may be no less severe than ones prevented by rumble strips.

An FHWA sponsored study wrestled with the moral dilemma of rumble strips keeping "unsafe drivers" (which includes impaired drivers) on the highway. "This group of unsafe drivers temporarily saved by the rumble strips may have caused some multiple-vehicle crashes involving harm to innocent victims to occur downstream from the treated site where no rumble strips existed. Unfortunately, as noted above, an examination of downstream crashes could not be conducted."

A 2008 Swedish study using a driving simulator and 35 sleep-deprived drivers concluded: "The main results showed an increase in sleepiness indicators from start to before hitting the rumble strip, an alerting effect in most parameters after hitting the strip. The alertness enhancing effect was, however, short and the sleepiness signs returned 5 min after the rumble strip hit. Essentially no effects were seen due to type of strip."

A 2003 Montana study suggested that on Interstates, shoulder rumble reduced the roll-over accident rates but the severity of unprevented roll-over accidents increased. This was thought to be due to the rumble strip "scaring" sleeping drivers to the extent that they overreacted. This problem was more pronounced on primary highways (that have narrower shoulders) with rumble strips.

=== "Classic" one-car crashes ===
The 'classic' one-car crash results when a vehicle slowly drifts to the right, hits dirt or rumble strips on the right shoulder of the road, and the driver becomes alert and overreacts, jerking the wheel left to bring the vehicle back onto the road. This motion causes the left front tire to strike the raised edge of the pavement at a sharp angle, often causing a rollover or a swerve into oncoming traffic. This form of one-car crash is "classic" because it occurs very often. Raised edges of pavement (or "edge-drops") were once common, but are now recognized as a hazard; it is now standard practice to level the gravel shoulder with the pavement, although edge-drops may reform due to soil erosion. This "slowly drift to the right" scenario applies to jurisdictions with right-hand traffic, so in jurisdictions with left-hand traffic it would be a "slowly drift to the left" scenario.

This phenomenon implies that a sleeping driver often does not react and begin to recover, until all four wheels have struck a rumble strip; if the paved shoulder is narrower than the width of the vehicle wheel track, a rumble strip may not prevent a sleeping driver from going off the road.

On a single-lane highway, an overreacting driver has less room to regain control, which may exacerbate their initial overreaction after striking the strips, resulting in a roll-over or head-on collision. A crash investigating officer stated: "It's consistent with someone who falls asleep or overreacts to the rumble strips", which implied that this was not the first time the officer has witnessed this situation. Note that in the KATU.com article photograph (in the upper left-hand corner) of the crash scene, the passenger-side tire print in the soft shoulder that suggests that all four wheels passed over the rumble strip before the driver attempted the unsuccessful recovery.

=== Fluidity of accident profiles ===
Accident profiles can change over time, and this can be considered a form of migration. Studies from Canada shows that over one decade the rate of off-road ATV accidents requiring hospitalization increased by 66%, while the rate for snowmobile accidents decreased 20%. Many of these recreational vehicle owners own both or choose one over the other. Data from the US shows that motorcycles are becoming more popular and that motorcycle fatalities are increasing, while car fatalities are decreasing. Many motorcyclists own or have access to a car.

=== Behavior adaptation ===
Rumble strips may gradually encourage inattentive driving – thereby partially negating any safety benefits in the long term. This is referred to as "behavior adaptation".

A 2006 US study suggested that airbags and anti-lock brakes can lead to unsafe driving. A 2007 Canadian study suggested that unsafe drivers are habitual, and that unsafe driving is increasing. A 2009 Canadian study indicated that, after a steady decline, drinking and driving has been on the increase since 2004. These support the migration and behavioral adaptation rumble strip concerns.

A safe driver population has more potential for negative behavior adaptation than an extreme unsafe driver population; whereas, an extreme unsafe driver population has more potential for positive behavior adaptation than a safe driver population.

=== Accident rates and profile ===
Different jurisdictions have different accident and fatality rates, as a function of various factors such as climate, road layout, demographics, educational programs, level of policing, driver attitudes toward night driving, promptness of emergency response, and level of medical intervention. For example, the 2006 Canadian motor vehicle fatality rate per province varied between 8.8 and 26.8 per 100,000 licensed drivers per year, with a national average of 13. The 2008 US rate is 20.05. Installing rumble strips on a highway with a relatively low accident rate and low proportion of accidents due to inattention will be relatively ineffective, even if the highway has 12-foot (3.7 m) paved shoulders.

The FHWA states: "Long sections of relatively straight roadways that make few demands on motorists are the most likely candidates for the installation of shoulder rumble strips." The degree of engagement of a highway affects the accident rate. Implied in this statement is that highways that are twisty and hilly with a variable foreground have low rates of accidents due to inattention, and are therefore not likely candidates for the installation of rumble strips. Installing rumble strips along a highway that is highly engaging, with a narrow shoulder, a low accident rate, and relatively low proportion of accidents due to fatigue or inattentive driving would have questionable value.

=== Diminishing marginal returns ===
In addition, safety improvements are not linear; there are diminishing marginal returns with a safer driver population, in which it is more difficult to further reduce the accident rate. Within the industrialized countries the rate varies between about 8 and 27 (per 100,000 licensed drivers per year).

"Safety improvements are usually subject to the law of diminishing marginal returns. This means that for every improvement of a fixed amount, the safety benefit gained decreases a little each time. For example, increasing the width of the median from 50m to 60m will decrease the number of collisions less than increasing it from 10m to 20m. Eventually, a width will be reached at which widening the median further cannot be justified because the improvement in safety is too small."

When the accident rate is close to the baseline of 8, there may already be several factors pushing it down so adding another safety factor (initiative) will only yield a very small improvement. Installing rumble strips on a highway with a high accident rate close to 27 should yield a relatively high accident reduction. This assumes that the road shoulder is adequate for a recovery, once a straying driver has been alerted by the rumble strips.

== Types of rumble strips ==
=== Continuous shoulder rumble strips (CSRS) ===
Montana undertook an extensive 10-year multi-site study of the effectiveness of CSRS on Interstate and primary highways (both types are divided pavements). This study also investigated the severity of crashes, which sets it apart from previous studies. The results indicated a 14% reduction in crashes on Interstate highways; however the effectiveness on primary highways indicated both improvements and worsening, and the results were considered inconclusive. It was found that "roll-overs" decreased in number, but increased in severity. The study only considered crashes in dry and wet conditions, not snow and ice.

The FHWA undertook a multi-state study involving test sites from Illinois and California. The Illinois component indicated crash reduction from 7.3% to 21.7%. The California component indicated crash reductions of 7.3%. This study also indicated an overall reduction of about 14%.

The 1997 New York State Thruway study indicated a 65% to 70% reduction. However, in a 1999 New York Times article regarding the New York State Thruway study, an official stated that the experiment was not done completely "pure", due to Troop T concurrently conducting a campaign to reduce drunk driving and increase seat-belt use, and Troop T's campaign would also reduce the number of fatal vehicle crashes. 10 to 24 percent of crashes are estimated to involve fatigue or inattention of some kind, but these numbers are based on guesswork. Despite this, the New York State Thruway study indicating a 65% to 70% reduction continues to be cited in literature.

New Zealand used rumble strips in small applications since the late 1980s, and started a larger program in 2004. Research in the country indicated that lane delineation with rumble strips reduced crashes by an average of 27% over all crash types and studies, with types of crashes such as "run off road" being reduced by up to 80% in some studies. Centre-line rumble strips showed similar effects. However, it appears that there were other crash reduction initiatives that may have contributed to the relatively sizable results.

The effects remained even after road users had become accustomed to the feature, while other road safety measures (when studied at specific installations) often showed declining effectiveness over time. Cost-benefit analysis showed that even on relatively low-volume roads, the costs of applying the markings were quickly exceeded several-fold by the economic benefits of improved road safety (as counted by the reduction of crash rates weighted against the average social costs of a crash).

Further research in New Zealand led to recommendations that strip edge lines and centre lines be marked over extended lengths of road, rather than just at focal points and crash black spots. Apart from the safety benefits of providing a consistent road environment, continuous markings provide valuable alerts to drivers long before the more common crash spots.

A one-third reduction rate is commonly cited and is based on an average of early studies. It includes the New York State Thruway and Pennsylvania Turnpike results which produced a skewed result non-representative of typical situations.

The one-third reduction rate and the Pennsylvania Turnpike Study (with a 60% reduction) are the rule-of-thumb and the classic study, but these can be misleading as CSRS do not have a "fixed" effectiveness that may be applied to any highway.

A 1999 FHWA study concluded that "a best guess" might be 20% to 30% reduction in single-vehicle run-off-road crashes on rural freeways, with less effective on urban freeways.

Almost all before-and-after studies are based on Interstate (freeway, turnpikes, thruways) test sites have minimum 12-foot (3.7 m) paved shoulders and high crash rates due to inattention.

The collision reduction attributed to the installation of CSRS is mainly a function of stable shoulder width, crash rate and profile, climate and diminishing marginal returns.

=== Centerline rumble strips (CRS) ===
Centerline Rumble Strips are applied to single-lane undivided highways to help prevent head-on collisions. When present, these are often milled into the pavement.

A 2005 National Cooperative Highway Research Program (NCHRP) study concluded that overall motor vehicle crashes at sites treated with Centerline Rumble Strips were reduced overall by 14%. In these situations the opposite lane and any paved shoulder would function as a generous recovery zone. However, this study did not investigate changes in crash severity, as did the 2005 Montana study.

It is interesting that the CRS reduction value is the same as the 2005 Montana CSRS study that indicated a 14% reduction in accidents on Interstate highways. This supports the hypothesis that the overall effectiveness of CSRS with a generous recovery zone is about 14%.

Ice and slush filled rumble strips can be a concern, particularly so for milled centerline rumble strips. For this reason, some jurisdictions are reluctant to install them.

A 2015 Federal Highway Administration study evaluated the application of shoulder rumble strips and centerline rumble strips in combination by analyzing geometric, traffic, and crash data obtained at treated two-lane rural road locations in Kentucky, Missouri and Pennsylvania. The results suggested that the effect of combining centerline and shoulder rumble strips further reduces run-off-road crashes compared to shoulder rumble strips alone and both total and fatal+injury crashes compared to centerline rumble strips alone. However, it appeared that shoulder rumble strips do not further reduce head-on+sideswipe-opposite-direction crashes than applying centerline rumble strips in isolation.

=== Continuous lane rumble strips (CLRS) ===
CLRS are applied to multiple lane highways to help prevent vehicles from drifting into the adjacent lane and possibility colliding with an overtaking vehicle. These are typically a raised reflective system.

=== Transverse rumble strips ===
Transverse rumble strips (TRS) may be used to warn drivers: of the need to stop (e.g. intersections, toll plazas); the need to slow down; the need to change lanes; of a change in roadway alignment; that they are leaving the traveled way; upcoming construction zones; wildlife crossings; and other potentially unexpected conditions.

As a traffic calming measure, TRS have been marginally successful in achieving speed reductions. A 2003 Texas study concluded: "However, the actual reductions in speeds have been in the range of 2 to 8 mph (3 to 13 km/h), which may be barely perceptible to the traveling public. There have been no studies that evaluate the reduction of excessive speeds."

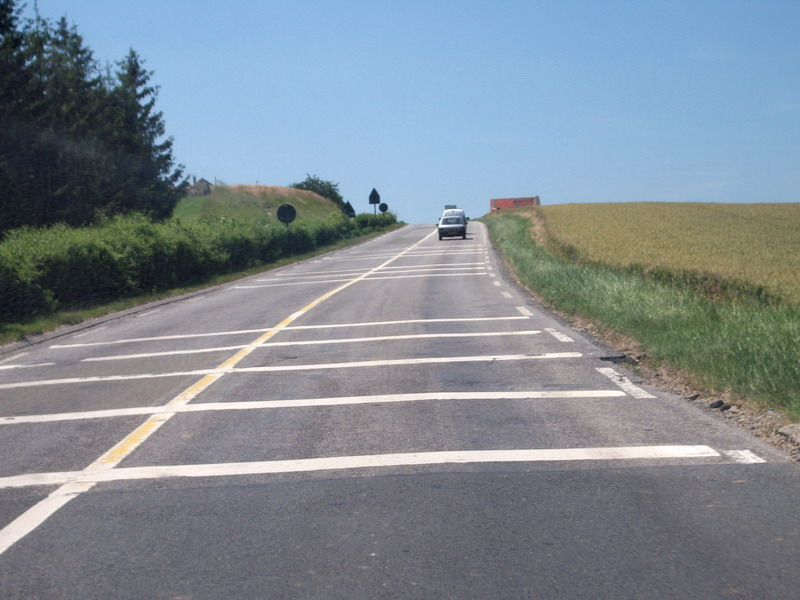
Series of French transverse rumble strips after a dangerous crossroads

As a construction zone safety measure, the effectiveness appears unclear. A 2007 Minnesota study concluded that while transverse rumble strips offer a low cost and easy-to-install option, they “did not seem to be successful at reducing approach speeds at the project sites”. A 2005 Maryland study stated: "In conclusion, although in the present study rumble strips did not produce the desired speed reduction effect, its use for work zone applications is still highly encouraged; though, not as a speed control measure but as a driver's attention-catching device."

As an approach stop-control crash reduction measure they have proven successful. The 2003 Texas indicated: "The majority of studies found reported large reductions (40% to 100%) of accidents after installing transverse rumble strips."

In Ghana, rumble strips running across the entire carriageway were installed at Suhum Junction on the main Accra-Kumasi highway and reduced crashes by about 35% and fatalities by about 55%. By reducing speeds the environment for and safety of pedestrians was improved with a decline in the "hit pedestrian" crash rate of 51%. "While the enforcement of speed limits by traffic police may not be affordable for most developing countries, rumble strips and speed humps were found to be effective on Ghanaian roads."

A 2009 FHWA intelligent systems study suggested that a combined infrastructure-based and in-vehicle warning could be highly effective in reducing crossing path crashes and fatalities at signalized intersections.

=== Mumble strips ===
As a way to mitigate noise impacts from traditional rumble strips, mumble strips were created in a sinusoidal design slightly recessed into the pavement. In 2021, mumble strips were made standard for all non-freeway installations in Michigan.

== Effectiveness ==
=== Effectiveness of CSRS on different classes of highway ===
Recent before-and-after studies suggest that the effectiveness of CSRS on Interstate highway (or freeways or thruways) with 12-foot (3.7 m) paved shoulders is about 7% to 21% with an overall effectiveness of about 14%.

The effectiveness of CSRS on the lower-standard primary highways (that are also divided) has not been given the same consideration as those on Interstate highways. The 2003 Montana study suggested that CSRS on primary highways can result in either worsening or improvement of crash rates. This may be due to variation in recovery zone width and condition, and other factors. The study also stated that unprevented crash severity may worsen, and the overall results were inconclusive. The study suggested that the differences in rumble strip-related crashes between Interstate highways and primary highways were due to the primaries having smaller shoulders than Interstates.

Secondary highways are single-lane undivided highways, and CSRS would be expected to be less effective than on primary highways. The most serious problem would be an increase in crash severity. Also, there is the concern of drivers sometimes overreacting and crossing the centerline, resulting in a head-on collision. The recovery zone width and condition of single-lane highways can vary greatly. It appears that there may be no published before-and-after CSRS studies for single-lane highways.

=== Actual vs. isolated CSRS and centerline rumble strips effectiveness ===
Given behavior adaptation and migration, the current rigorous Interstate effectiveness of 14%, and CLRS on single-lane highways effectiveness of 14% could be over-estimations of the actual "big-picture" reduction. In certain situations, such as an engaging single-lane highways that typically have narrow shoulders, high precipitation, in a northern climate with frequent freeze-thaw cycles, rumble strip effectiveness may be negative.

As before-and-after studies become broader and more sophisticated, it appears the reduction estimates for both CSRS and CRS are less impressive. This may be due to the initial installations were on highways that had been identified as having very high accident rates due to inattention. Also, there may have been other accident reduction campaigns in concert with rumble strip programs."

Also, as lane departure warning systems built into vehicles become more widespread, the physical CSRS, CRS, and CLRS in pavements may become increasingly redundant.

=== Shoulder width ===
Research has found that on rural freeways, rumble strips are much more effective when placed at or near the edgeline than when placed closer to the shoulder edge. Edgeline rumble strips can be expected to reduce crashes by 28.8%, and non-edgeline rumble strips only reduce crashes by 8.9%.

On two-lane roads, there is little difference in effectiveness between edgeline and non-edgeline rumble strips, with crash reduction factors of 39.2% and 41.9%, respectively. FHWA now recommends rumble strips on two lane roads if the edge of shoulder is more than 13 feet (4.0 m) from the centerline, especially if the road has high volumes, poor geometry, or a history of run-off-road crashes.

The 2003 Montana study stated that in certain cases, the rumble strips may act only as a warning of an impending crash, and that sort of a situation is much more likely where less shoulder is available for recovery.

=== Recovery zone condition ===
A concern about highways with narrow paved shoulders is the condition of the adjacent gravel shoulder. Sometimes, the paved and gravel shoulders are combined as the "recovery zone" beyond the rumble strip. However, if the gravel is loose, soft, non-level, eroded, or there is an "edge-drop" from the pavement to the gravel, then the gravel shoulder portion will be ineffective for recovery, especially at highway speeds. When a vehicle's tires sink into a soft shoulder, thus compromising vehicle handling, it is known as "vehicle tripping".

Virtual rumble strips require an adequate recovery zone as well.

== Deterioration ==
=== Climate ===
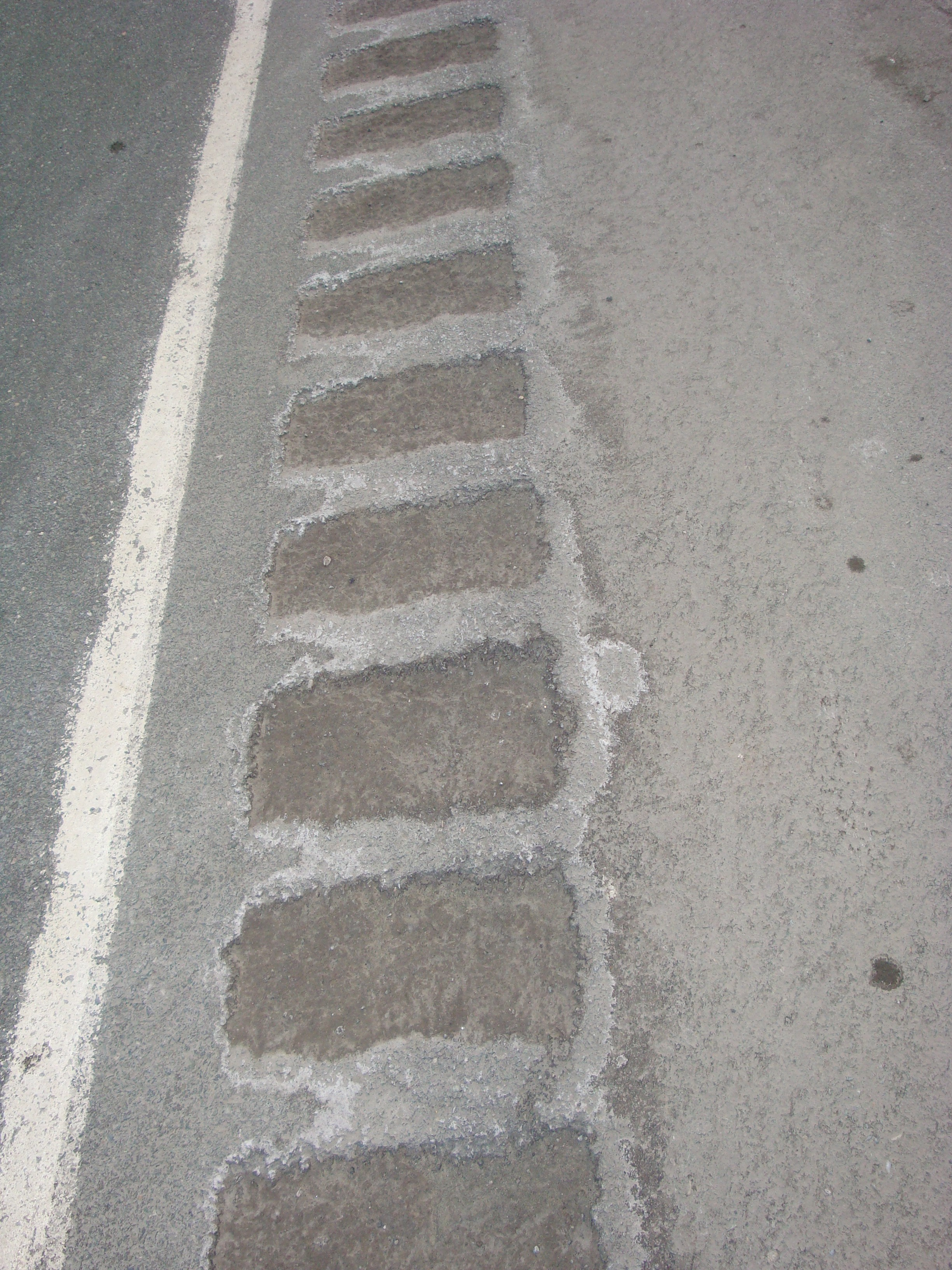
Traction sand filled shoulder rumble strip. The sand is "cemented" in-place and is not easily removed by truck traffic.

Climate is another factor that affects the success of a rumble strips installation. If they are installed in a northern climate, they may be filled or partially filled with a deicing salt and traction sand mixture. They may also be filled with ice. This is a particular concern in regions with freeze-thaw cycles requiring frequent deicing. Furthermore, strips filled with water, snow, slush, and ice may cause or aggravate occasional accidents. Generally, air turbulence and vibration from passing large trucks keep rumble strips clear of debris and ice, but this process may take several days. Moist traction sand tends to cake together or freezes, and is not easily dislodged by truck traffic. This is problematic on low-volume highways with frequent deicing, and can significantly reduce the effectiveness of rumble strips in winter months.

When rumble strips are installed on a very narrow paved shoulder, sometimes sand and gravel can fill the rumble strip which is usually a problem in the winter and early spring.

If the snow-cover is substantial, then the shoulder (including the rumble strip) is usually partially snow-covered as the snowplow's wing-blade doesn't clear the entire shoulder. Vehicles going off the road usually collide with the shoulder snow bank or go into a snow-filled ditch which reduces the possibility of serious damage and injury. In these situations, the rumble strip effectiveness can be negated but the crash implications are mitigated by the snow bank.

=== Pavement deterioration ===
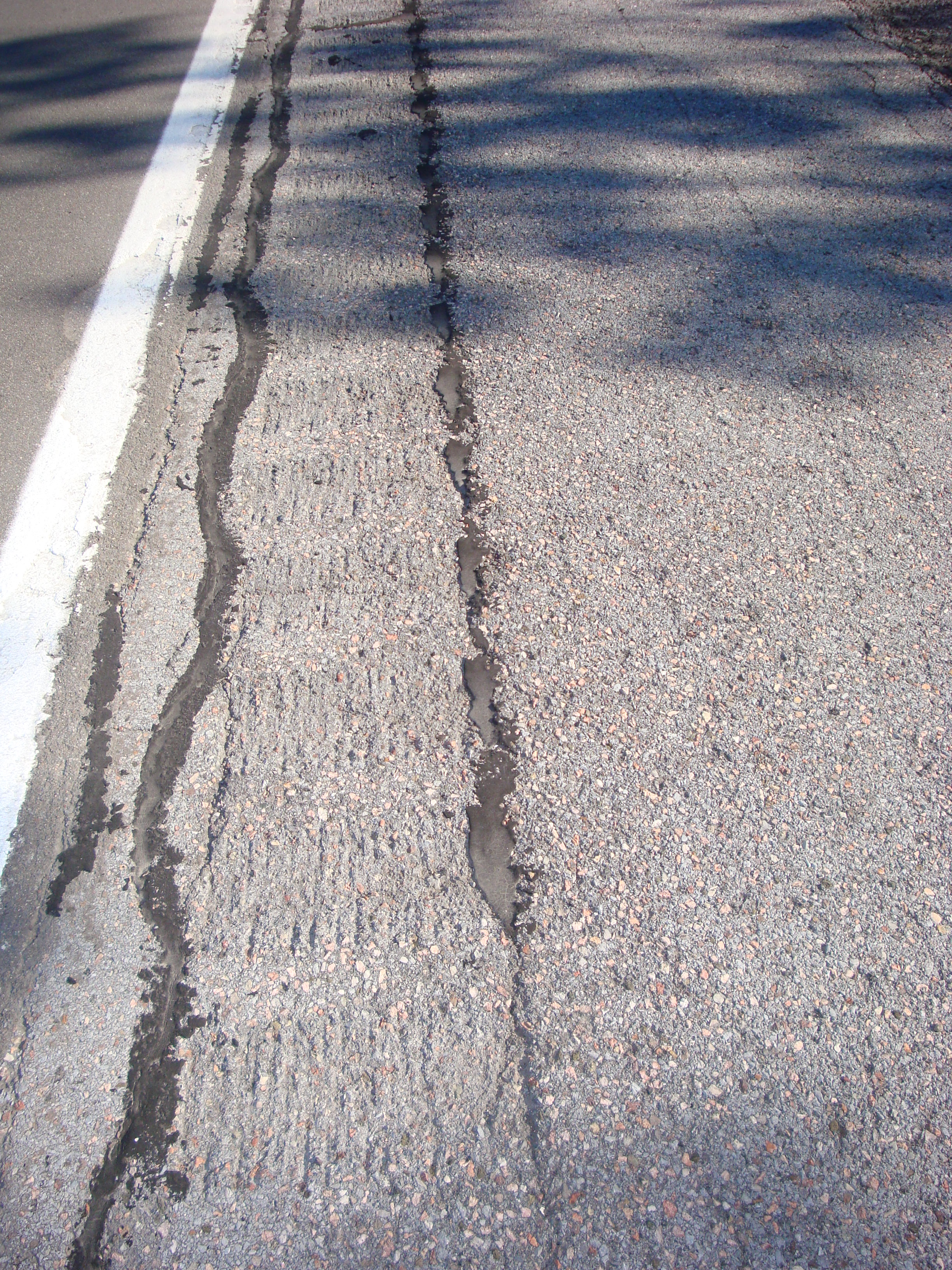
An example of extensive cracking in rumble strips due to frost jacking on Interstate Highway 81 north of Syracuse. These parallel cracks were sealed. There were other sections with grass and weeds growing up through the rumble strip cracks

Generally, deterioration of the shoulder asphalt pavement due to rumble strip installation is not a problem. However, if the sub-grade under the CSRS is poorly compacted or has poor drainage characteristics; or the gravel shoulder has eroded, crack(s) may form in the CSRS. Sand tends to fall into these cracks resulting in "jacking" of the cracks. Water percolates vertically down through the soil, but it also creeps horizontally under the paved shoulder. This may be a particular problem with narrow paved shoulders in regions with frequent freeze-thaw cycles that may result in frequent frost-heaving of the paved shoulder.

US and Canadian guidelines recommend not installing rumble strips in asphalt pavement displaying cracks, to avoid excessive break-up of pavement. It is also recommended that rumble strips be inspected in summer months for cracking, potholing, water ponding, and snowplow damage. If necessary, structural problems should be repaired. If the cracks become wide enough, grass and weeds will grow in the cracks accentuating the deterioration.

The centerline of highway has a pavement joint and if milled CLRS are installed over this joint they will make pavement more vulnerable to deterioration. Truckers have reported deterioration of the joint and the CLRS.

Also, road salt prematurely degrades asphalt, so having it retained and concentrated in rumble strips is not desirable.

== Opposition and removal ==
In February 2010, Johnson County, Kansas, considered legislation to allow buses to travel on the paved shoulder (which was rumble stripped) when traffic slows to less than 35 mph (56 km/h). The estimated cost was between $17.6 million and $20 million, including $2.4 million to remove the already-existing rumble strips along the shoulder of I-35. The Kansas House Transportation Committee had said it would be modeled after a similar project in Minneapolis, Minnesota.

Some residents living close to either newly installed lane or transverse rumble strips have complained about noise levels and were successful in having them removed at considerable expense. In 2004, the town of Chapel Hill, North Carolina, had transverse rumble strips removed as the measured noise from nighttime traffic on the rumble strips exceeded the Town's Noise Ordinance. The noise levels at the sidewalk ranged from 60 to 77 decibels, higher than the 60 decibel noise level limit in the Town's Noise Ordinance during nighttime hours. In 2005, the London borough of Bromley removed transverse rumble strips after residents complained of the excessive "machine gun fire" noise. In 2010, Reno County planned to remove rumble strips from a roundabout after residents complained about excessive noise levels.

The Transportation Association of Canada and US FHWA guidelines basically specify that a width of 1.5 m (4.9 ft) of clear paved shoulder between the outside of the rumble strip and the edge of pavement is adequate to provide cyclists with a clear travel path.

However, in situations of parked vehicle on the shoulder, debris on the shoulder, or downhill sections even with the 1.5 m (4.9 ft) clear path requirement, rumble strips present a significant hazard particularly if the pavement is wet. The argument that rumble strips help protect cyclists is moot, as inattentive drivers' vehicles generally pass entirely over the rumble strip before recovery (if any).

Other related FHWA guidelines are: "Rumble strips should not normally be used in urban or suburban areas or along roadways where prevailing speeds are less than 50 mph (80 km/h)." and "All responsible agencies should work in cooperation with bicycle groups, enforcement agencies, emergency groups and other roadway users, to develop policies, design standards and implementation techniques that address the safety and operational needs of all roadway users." and "To provide a clear area beyond the rumble strip for bicycle travel, highway maintenance agencies should periodically sweep shoulders along identified bicycle routes of high bicycle usage."

In the United States, the 1999 American Association of State Highway and Transportation Officials (AASHTO) Guide for the Development of Bicycle Facilities recommends minimum standards for road shoulders receiving rumble strips to accommodate all users of the roadway and make best use of funds.

In New Jersey, a centerline rumble strip was placed in the vicinity of the D&R Canal without a permit from the Delaware & Raritan Canal Commission in violation of state law. The excessive noise through a residential area and the fact that the work was not appropriately permitted was complained about to the New Jersey Department of Transportation by a local homeowner, with no corrective action taken by the New Jersey Department of Transportation.

Excessive noise is noted in a Canadian study as a reason not to install rumble strips, and it is advised not to install rumble strips within 200 metres (660 ft) of a residential area. The report states that "a balance is required between installing effective rumble strips and minimizing noise impacts. Studies show that rumble strips terminated approximately 200 m (660 ft) away from residential or urban areas produce tolerable noise impacts on residences. At an offset of 500 m (1,600 ft), the noise from rumble strips is negligible.” In an Open Public Records Act Request, this study was the only document provided by the New Jersey Department of Transportation when requested to provide policy documents and safety studies relating to its implementation of centerline rumble strips.

=== Cycling complaints ===
Numerous US and Canadian cycling associations have complained about encroachment of rumble strips. One club even launched a lawsuit to have them paved over, although the suit was dismissed for lack of standing.

A 2005 Quebec study concluded: "Based on the results of the analyses, it was not possible to recommend a type of rumble strip that would provide sufficient warning to drivers who encroach on the shoulder while remaining safe for cyclists who ride over it." A 2003 Montana study stated that bicyclists cannot operate on shoulders with rumble strips and that shoulders would have to be swept as needed.

Once a section of highway with narrow paved shoulders is rumble-stripped, informed cyclists tend to avoid it, but unsuspecting cyclists occasionally have serious accidents. Much bicyclist opposition to rumble strips stems from situations in which no quantitative data was used to justify their installation, or installation was not in accordance with guidelines. Rumble strips on narrow shoulders force cyclists into the travel lanes, where it is less safe to ride. Furthermore, this scenario forces drivers to make an otherwise unnecessary lane change to go around cyclists and there is a correlation with frequency of lane changes and accidents. "According to the National Highway Traffic Safety Administration, 9 percent (533,000) of all accidents occurred when vehicles were changing lanes or merging." In certain incidents, a vehicle attempting to avoid cyclists (without striking the cyclists) may go off the road or even sideswipe a passing or an oncoming vehicle. Center-line rumble strips are a concern for cyclists as well, as motorists are less inclined to cross the centerline to provide sufficient space when passing bicyclists.

Rumble strips are very inexpensive to install, so there is concern that some installations are frivolous. The 2009 economic stimulus infrastructure spending in the US and Canada has raised concerns that many new shoulder rumble strips will be frivolous as well.

=== Amish lobby ===
In 2009 in St. Joseph County, Michigan (US) a new $20,000 rumble strip installation was removed at a cost of $275,000 to the taxpayers. Local Amish community members had lobbied for the change, saying the rumble strips were a hazard when traveling by horse and buggy. The Michigan Department of Transportation said they did not remove the strips solely to appease the Amish. They say "it is far more dangerous to have horses jumping out into the road that [sic] it is to not have the rumble strips on the road."

=== Tire damage ===
Motor vehicle tires can become permanently damaged if a flat occurs in the traffic lane and the driver pulls over onto the shoulder with the flat tire passing over the rumble strip. This may cause the flat tire's sidewalls to be crushed or abraded between the metal wheel rim and rumble strip high-points.

== Wildlife attraction ==
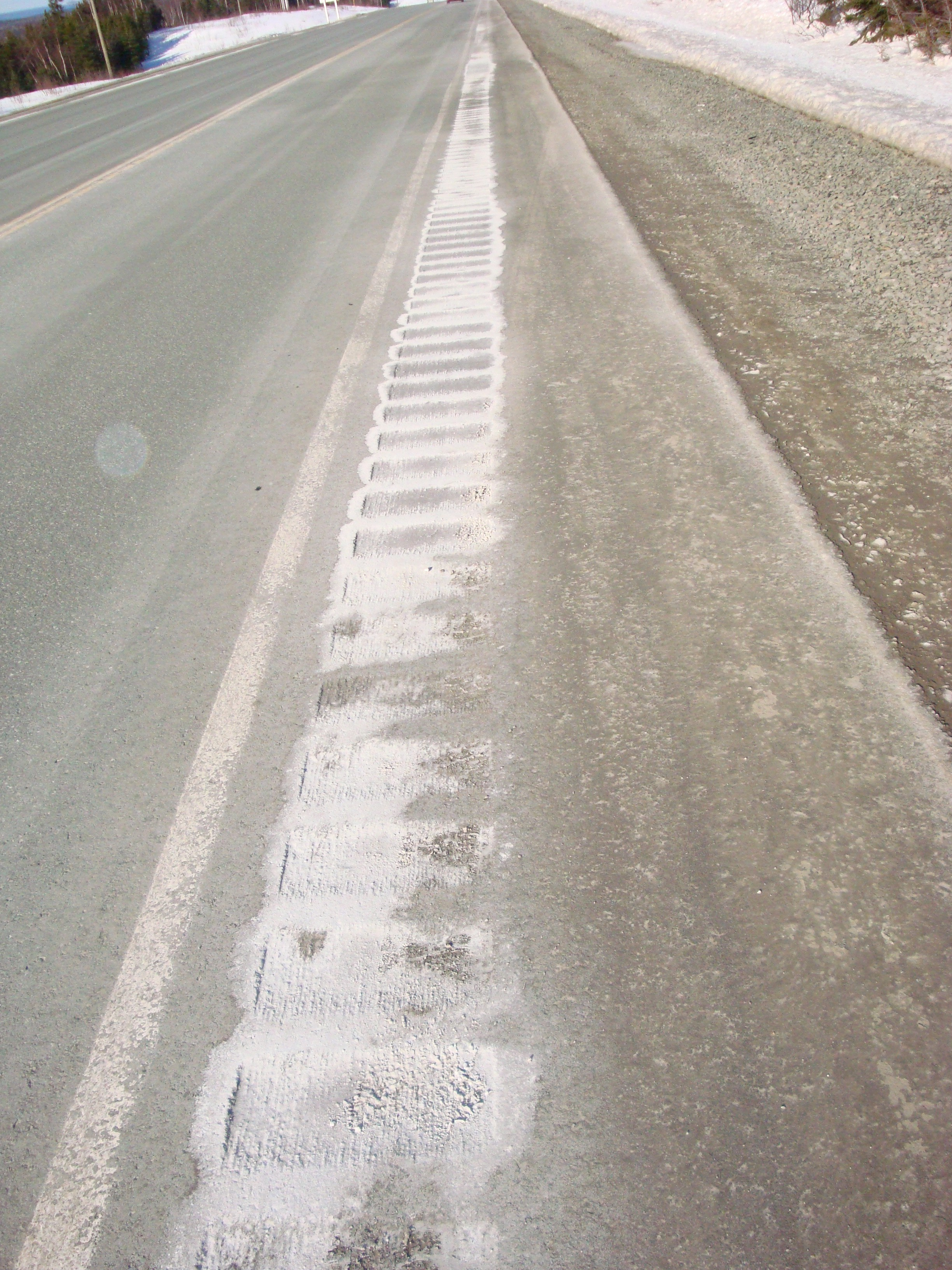
Deicing salt-filled and stained rumble strip. The rock salt has been "cemented" in place

Wildlife-vehicle collisions can be a significant problem when large animals are involved such as moose, elk, and deer, which can cause serious vehicle damage, injury, and fatalities. Separate studies in New Hampshire (US) and Quebec (Canada), of radio-collared moose found that home ranges were associated with salt licks formed by road salt runoff. These roadside salt licks were thought to increase moose-vehicle collisions. Normally, salt would make its way off the pavement onto the gravel shoulder and into the soil; however, rumble strips will retain and create a salt lick on the road surface. Loose rock salt in the rumble strip subjected to evaporating moisture will cake and accumulate and is not easily dislodged by truck traffic.

== See also ==
- Musical road
- Raised pavement marker
- Road hazard
- Road surface marking
- Road traffic control
- Speed bump
- Tactile paving, a conceptually similar warning for pedestrians.
