= Elbert Dysart Botts =

American engineer and professor (1893-1962); oversaw development of Botts' dots

- Born: January 2, 1893; Lancaster, Missouri, US
- Died: April 10, 1962 (aged 69); Sacramento, California, US
- Resting place: East Lawn Memorial Park, East Sacramento, California
- Education: Wisconsin, Ph.D. 1924
- Engineering career
- Institutions: California Department of Transportation
- Employer: San Jose State College
- Significant design: Botts' dots

Elbert Dysart Botts (January 2, 1893 – April 10, 1962) was the California Department of Transportation (Caltrans) engineer credited with overseeing the research that led to the development of Botts' dots and possibly the epoxy used to attach them to the road.

Botts was born in Missouri in 1893 and was a professor of chemistry at San Jose State College when he was recruited to Caltrans.

He is credited with leading the division of the Caltrans research laboratory (Translab) that conducted the initial research into identifying the best shapes and materials for raised pavement markers. Much of the necessary field research was conducted by his team on a new freeway in West Sacramento in the spring of 1955. Although the initial goal was to improve lane visibility, it was at this point that the tactile feedback provided by the dots was discovered.

At Caltrans, Botts dots were developed as a way to address the problem of paint disappearing when under water.

Botts never lived to see the success of his research. He died in April 1962 and his work on the dots was filed away; it was not even mentioned in his obituary in Translab's internal newsletter. Two years later, his research was rediscovered when his division, now under the direction of Herbert Rooney, decided to conduct further research into raised pavement markers. At this time, Translab developed the modern pattern of interspersing plastic square reflectors between groups of four round polyester or epoxy dots. This pattern was first tested along Interstate 80 near Vacaville in 1965. To minimize the risk that dots would become coated with rubber scraped off tires, Translab switched to ceramic round markers in 1966.
