= Steen Krarup Jensen =

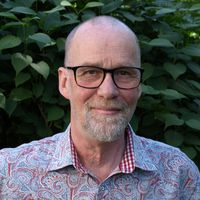
- Born: 12 April 1950
- Citizenship: Kingdom of Denmark
- Education: Royal Danish Academy of Fine Arts
- Occupations: sculptor, poet
- Years active: 1971–present
- Notable work: Skovbakketrolden, Et lille land og lige midt i verden
- Children: Simon Jensen, Anna Krarup Jensen
- Website: official website

Signature
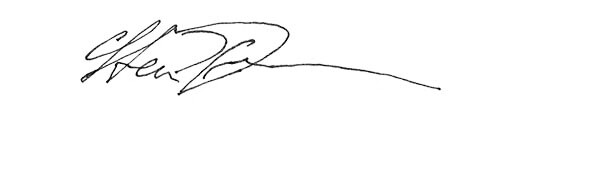

Steen Krarup Jensen (born April 12, 1950) is a Danish sculptor, poet, songwriter and social critic. He is educated in sculpture at The Royal Danish Academy of Fine Arts during the period from 1971 to 1978. In 1977 he received Viggo Jarls Legacy.

Steen Krarup Jensen has worked with marble and granite and been experimenting with a lot of other materials in mobiles and assemblages. He is also one of the two inventors of the asphaltophone (see musical road).

Steen Krarup Jensen was the founder of Danske Billedkunstneres Fagforening, a union of Danish sculptors. In connection to that, he became famous in 1981 when he blew up a sculpture with dynamite as a protest against the living conditions of Danish sculptors.

As a writer he has written a large number of texts for variety shows, songs and newspaper chronicles.

In 2007, Steen Krarup Jensen and composer Jakob Freud-Magnus won a Danish contest by writing a suggestion for a new national anthem.

Steen Krarup Jensen is the father of jazz musician Simon Jensen and poet Anna Krarup Jensen.

== Sources ==
- Official website of Steen Krarup Jensen (in Danish)
- Kunstindeks Danmark & Weilbach Kunstnerleksikons information about Steen Krarup Jensen
- Newspaper articles and other information about Steen Krarup Jensen at Syntese.nu
- Website for the winning song (Steen Krarup Jensen/Jacob Freud-Magnus) of the national anthem contest (in Danish)
