= Botts' dots =

Round non-reflective raised pavement markers

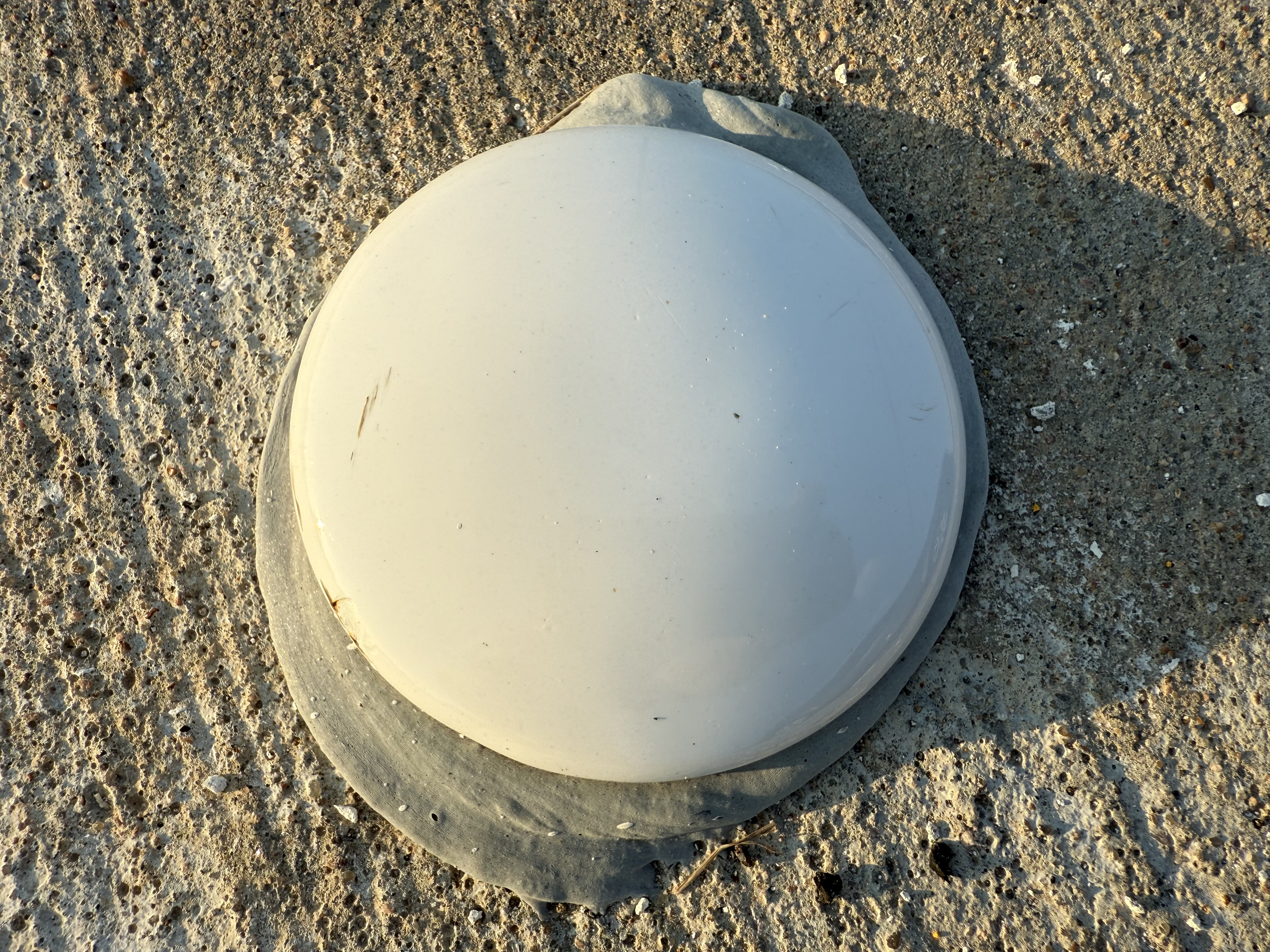
A round, white Botts' dot, surrounded by excess adhesive

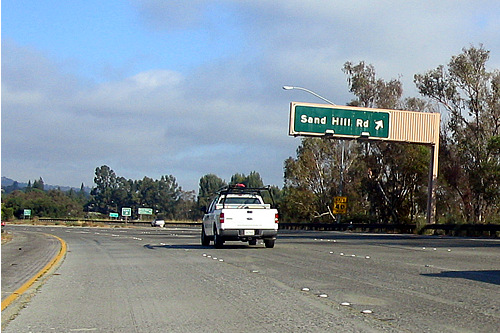
Botts' dots on Interstate 280, near the Sand Hill Road exit, Menlo Park, California

Botts' dots (turtles in Washington and Oregon or buttons in Texas and other southern states) are round non-reflective plastic and ceramic raised pavement markers. In many parts of the US, Botts' dots are used, along with reflective raised pavement markers, to mark lanes on highways and arterial roads. They provide tactile and auditory feedback to drivers when moving across designated travel lanes, and are analogous to rumble strips.

Botts' dots are named after Elbert Dysart Botts, a California Department of Transportation (Caltrans) engineer credited with overseeing the research that led to the development of the markers.

Botts' dots are most commonly white but may be yellow when used to substitute for the yellow lines that divide opposing directions of traffic in North America. Many California Botts Dots are made of ceramic, other dots may be made of plastics such as polyester.

On some roads, lanes are marked only with a mix of Botts' dots and conventional reflective markers, eliminating the need to repaint lane divider lines. This kind of substitution is expressly authorized by Section 3B.14 of the Manual on Uniform Traffic Control Devices. Botts' dots and other raised markers are rarely used in regions with substantial snowfall, because snow plows damage or dislodge them.

== History ==
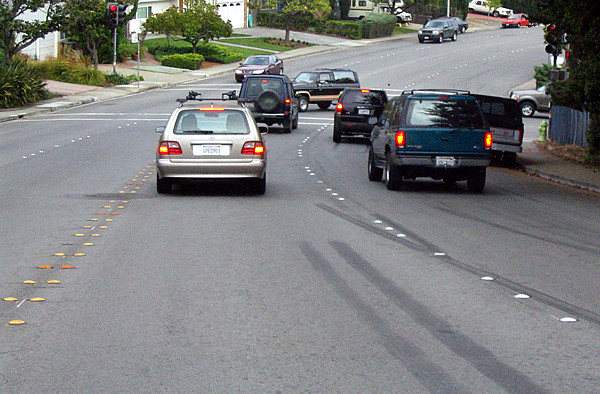
Botts' dots replace the painted median stripes. Reflective Stimsonite (darker orange) markers are spaced at regular intervals for increased visibility at night.

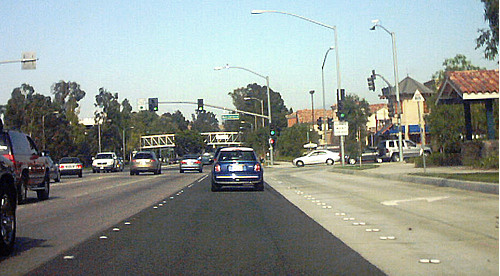
Valencia, California

Caltrans engineers may have studied the concept of raised pavement markers as early as 1936. However, the department did not commence research in earnest until 1953, when the postwar economic boom resulted in an alarming increase in the number of cars and car accidents in California. Painted lines tended to become invisible during rain.

The initial dots were made of glass and were attached to the road by nails or tacks, as suggested by Botts. The nails were soon abandoned: his team discovered that when the dots popped loose under stress, the nails punctured tires. A "former student of Botts named Herb Rooney developed a tough, fast-setting epoxy that could bond the raised reflectors to virtually any solid surface".

In September 1966, the California State Legislature mandated that Botts' dots be used for lane markings for all state highways in all non-snowfall areas.

== Usage in California ==
Today, there are more than 25 million Botts' dots in use in California, though they have started falling out of favor. In 2017, Caltrans announced that it would stop using Botts' dots as the sole indicator of lane division, due to cost and worker safety, and in order to make roadways more compatible with self-driving cars. Reflective lane markings will be wider and thicker, providing some of the tactile feedback the Botts' dots provided. In California, highway lanes may be marked either solely by Botts' dots, or dots placed over painted lines. Four dots are used for broken lines on freeways, and broken lines on surface streets may use only three dots. Reflective pavement markers are placed at regular intervals between Botts' dots to increase the visibility of lane markings at night.

== Usage in other states and other parts of the world ==
In the Las Vegas area of southern Nevada, roads with multiple lanes use four pavement markers for each broken white line, a reflective marker followed by three Botts' dots.

Botts' dots are used extensively in Hawaii. Most state-owned roads and many arterial roads in the state use Botts' dots as the delineation between lanes. They are also used for the dashed marking in passing areas.

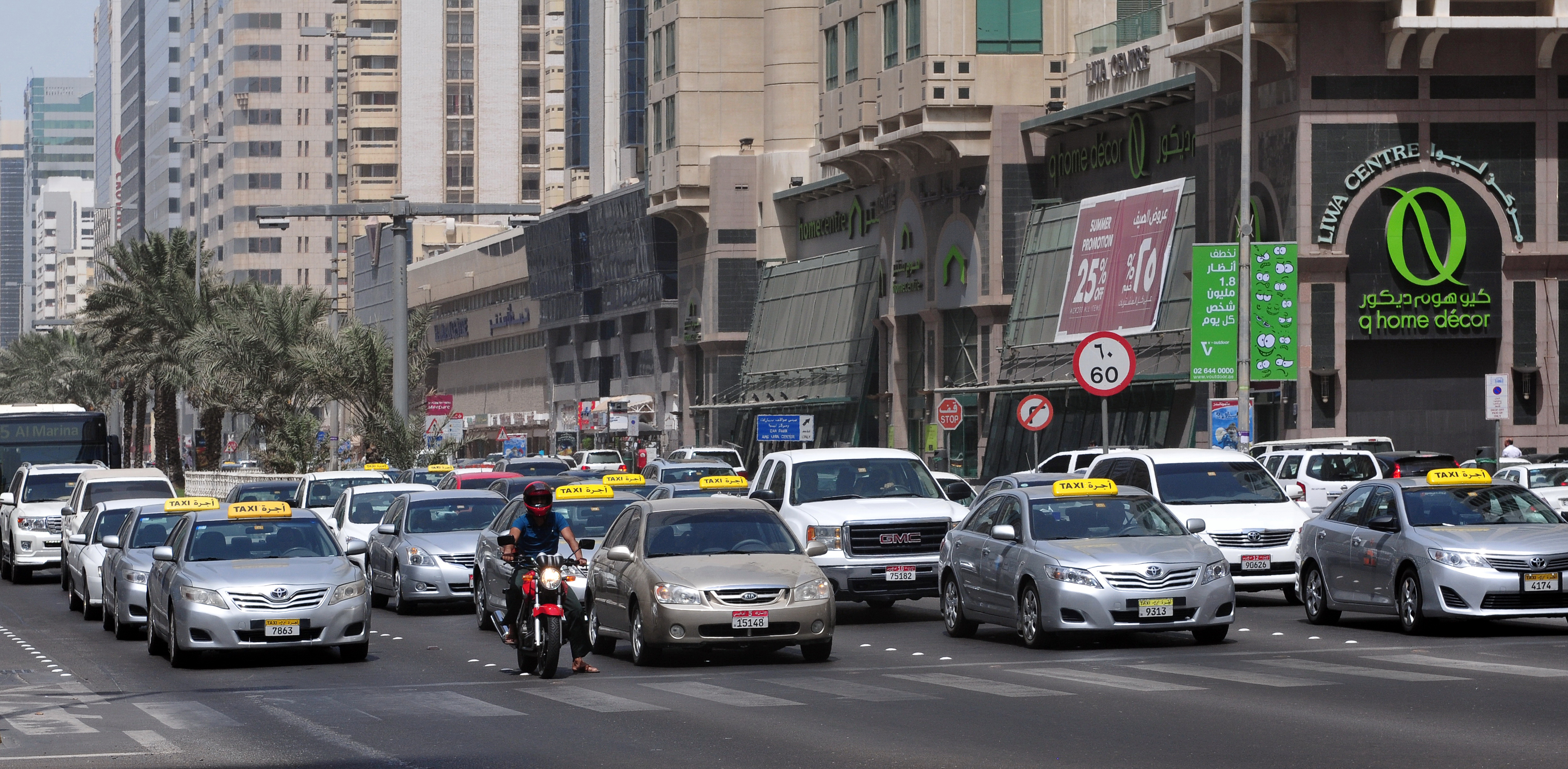
Botts dots on the road in Abu Dhabi, United Arab Emirates

More recently, Botts' dots have been used in the snow-free areas of Alabama, Florida, Louisiana, Mississippi, Nevada, Georgia, Washington, and Texas. Some states that do experience snow, particularly Pennsylvania and Massachusetts, use Botts' dots only during the summer months for temporary lane markings in construction zones. Typically, the dots are installed when construction starts in the spring, and they are removed when work stops for the winter.

In New Mexico, where snow is uncommon in most locations during the winter, Botts' dots are used along with reflective markers to outline gore areas at interchanges, but the state does not use either for regular lane markings on state highways. Some local jurisdictions (notably Alamogordo and Las Cruces) use Botts' dots and reflective markers for regular lane markings on local streets. Botts' dots had also been employed previously in Albuquerque, but the city has since discontinued their use in favor of reflective paint for pavement markings.

Until the late 1990s, Botts' dots were also used extensively in the snow-free areas of Arizona; however, ADOT has since ended this practice, opting for painted stripes with reflective markers instead. However, they can still be found on US Route 95 south of Yuma, as well as on some local streets in Yuma and Tucson.

Many states in snow-prone areas of the Midwest and Northeastern United States use reflectors placed into protective metal castings, which allow them to be plowed over without being dislodged from the road surface. These pavement markers are usually augmented with reflective paint and delineators placed on plastic or metal posts at regular intervals along the edges of the road. In California and other locations in the Southwest United States that experience occasional but significant snowfall, the reflectors are placed into recessed pockets in the roadway, which allows visibility during dry weather but permits a plow blade to travel across the reflector without dislodging it, with no special protective castings needed.

In New Zealand, Botts' dots are most commonly used on motorways and expressways alongside reflective cat’s-eyes. A typical pattern alternates one cat’s-eye with three Botts' dots within each ten-metre section of the centreline.

== See also ==
- Cat's eye (road)
- Raised pavement marker
- Rumble strip
