= Raised pavement marker =

Road safety device

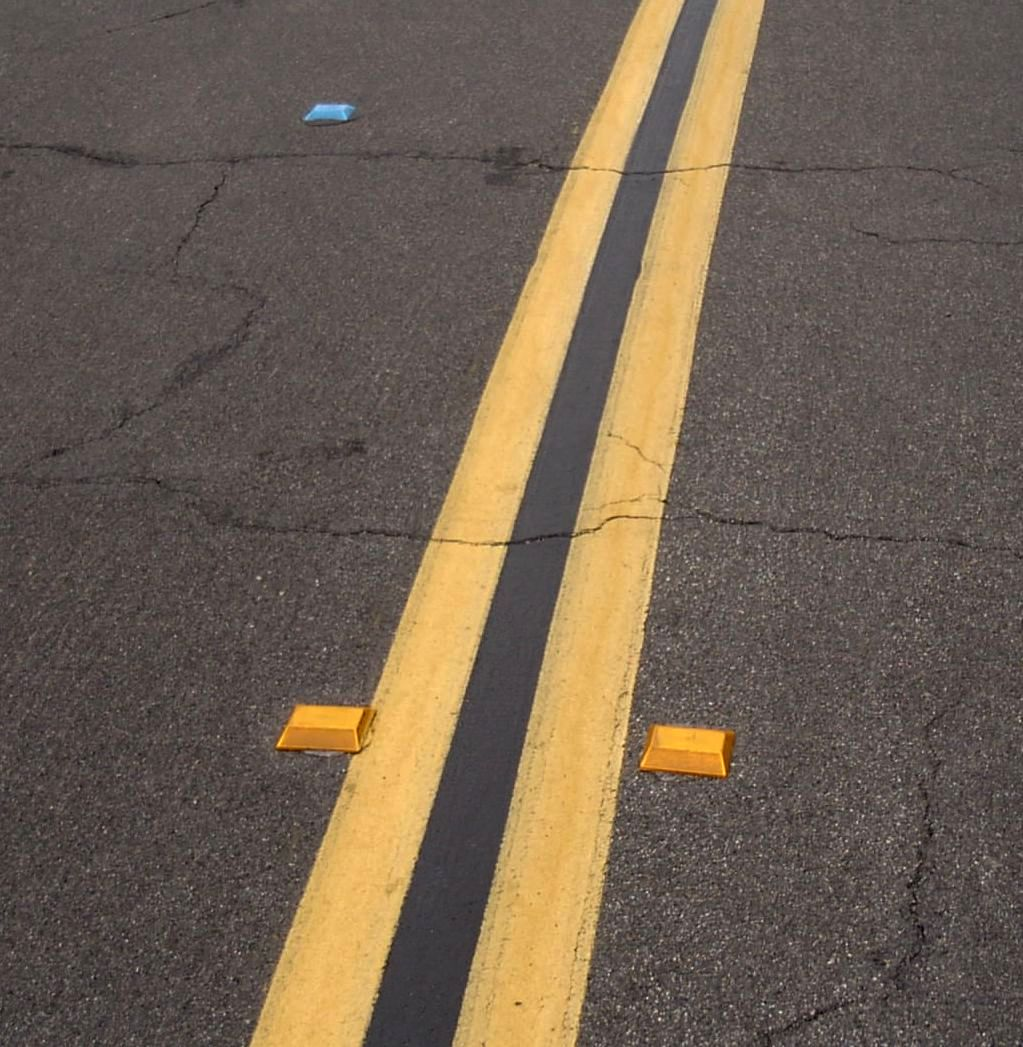
The orange markers separate opposing traffic lanes. The blue marker denotes a fire hydrant on the left sidewalk.

A raised pavement marker is a safety device used on roads. These devices are usually made with plastic, ceramic, thermoplastic paint, glass or occasionally metal, and come in a variety of shapes and colors. Raised reflective markers, such as plastic, ceramic, or metal ones, include a lens or sheeting that enhances their visibility by retroreflecting automotive headlights, while glass road studs gather automotive headlights with a dome shape and reflect the lights with a reflective layer within. Some other names for specific types of raised pavement markers include convex vibration lines, Botts' dots, delineators, cat's eyes, road studs, or road turtles. Sometimes they are simply referred to as "reflectors".

== Convex vibration marking line ==
The surface of this type of vibrating coating line is distributed and scattered with raised bumps. Some bumps are coated with high-refractive-index glass beads. When a speeding vehicle runs over the raised road lines, it produces a strong warning vibration to remind the car driver of deviation from the lane. Perpendicular to driving directions, these marking lines are used for settled mainline toll plaza, ramp entrances, mountainous areas, continuous sharp turns, downhill sections and the end of the highway (intersection of highway exit and the plane of the common roadway), gates and entrances of enterprises, institutions, and school. In the same direction of traffic driving direction, they are mainly settled in the median strip, edge lines, and dangerous sections of the road.

== Reflective raised pavement markers ==
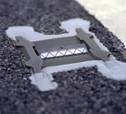
Snowplow-resistant reflective marker

In the United States, Canada, Mexico, some countries of South America, Thailand and Australia, these plastic devices commonly have two angled edges facing drivers and contain one or more corner reflector strips. The marker is generally held in place using butyl pads, epoxy glue, or bitumen. In areas with little snowfall, reflective raised pavement markers are applied directly on top of the road surface. The device's retroreflective surface enables the device to be clearly visible at long distances at night and in rainy weather. The devices come in multiple colors in accord with local traffic marking standards.

In 1965 San Diego Police Motorcycle Officer Kenneth Grant Maine, improved upon and applied for a patent on the white epoxy-resin reflective raised pavement marker. He then submitted it to the California Bureau of Highways, later called the California Department of Transportation, which is now known as Caltrans.

In areas where snowplowing is frequent, conventional markers are placed in a shallow groove cut in the pavement, or specially designed markers are used which include a protective metal casting that is embedded in recesses in the pavement, allowing the marker to protrude slightly above the pavement surface for increased visibility, much like a cat's eye.

Lit LED in-pavement Raised Pavement Markings (RPMs), help improve road safety, as they are more generally visible than reflective RPM markings as they are internally lit and don't require headlights to show up. The RPMs are usually raised for visibility, but in snowplow areas these types of RPMs can be installed flush-mounted within the pavement to avoid the snowplows.

There are a number of types, ranging from a single LED point source RPMs, with limited daytime visibilities, (road studs), to multi-LED linear type RPMs, visible in all full sunlight and nighttime applications.

Some lit RPMs can be visible and useful in both bright sunlight as well as nighttime applications, whilst others are only visible at nighttime or in low light applications.

One of the key differences between these types is that lit linear RPMs, being linear, each lit unit provides both positional and directional guidance to viewers. For single-point source viewer directional guidance, a number of these units must all be viewed at the same time. In severe weather, such as fog or snow whiteouts, this may not be possible. Therefore, as each linear visual aid provides both positional and directional guidance, this type is more helpful as in a wider variety of weather conditions and light conditions.

Some lit linear visual aids / RPMs, melt snow, without needing any additional heating elements, as such, these types or self-cleaning RPMs are more energy-efficient compared to those that need additional heating elements to melt snow so are NOT self-cleaning.

Linear visual aids can also be used for creating in-pavement signs and messages such as lit merge arrows. Point source RPMs could be used for such signage. However, because they are installed close together, and deep within the pavement compared to linear RPMs, such usage would tend to damage the road, especially in the case of asphalt roads.

=== Usage of color ===
==== In Europe ====
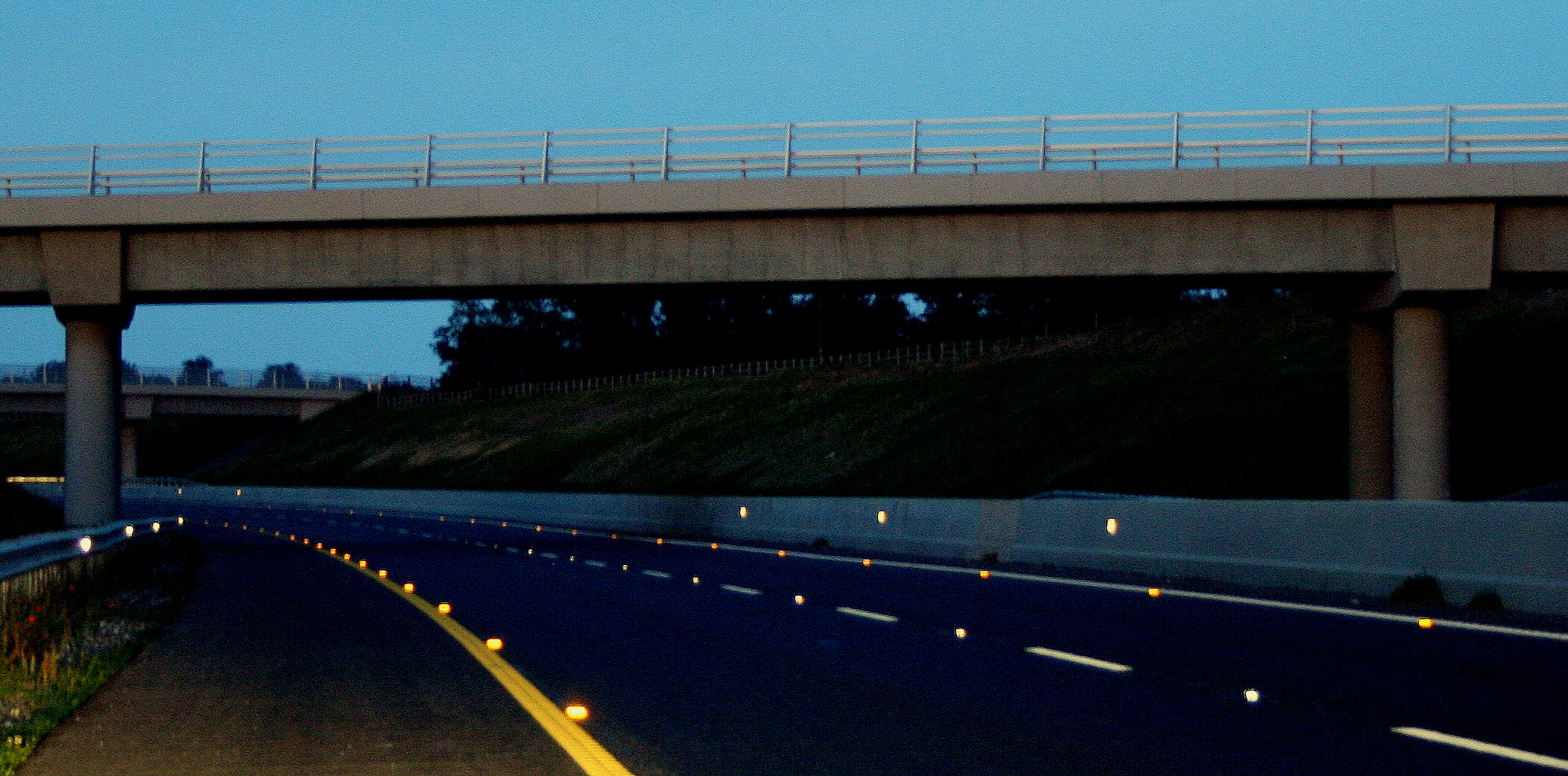
M9 motorway in Carlow, Ireland with cat's eyes on the road surface and retroreflectors on barriers

In almost all European countries, such markers will include reflective lenses of some kind. Most appear white or gray during daylight; the colors discussed here are the color of light they reflect. Because of their inconspicuousness during the day, they are always used in conjunction with painted retro-reflective lines; they are never seen on their own.

- White markers — for lane markings. When used on dual carriageways, motorways or one-way roads, they may illuminate red on the reverse, to indicate drivers are traveling the wrong way.
- Yellow or amber markers — These are found next to the central reservation (US: median) on motorways and dual carriageways and, in the Republic of Ireland, are also used on hard shoulders.
- Red markers — These are found by the hard shoulder on motorways and at the edge of the running surface on other roads. They are also occasionally used to indicate a no-entry road and when travelling down the wrong way of the motorway/dual carriageway.
- Green markers — These are used where slip-roads (US: off-ramp) leave and join the main carriageway on dual carriageways. In some countries, they are also used across the entrances of minor roads or accesses onto major single carriageway roads or lay-bys.
- Blue markers — Are used to indicate the entrance to police reserved slip-roads (these do not lead anywhere, they are to allow police to park and monitor motorway traffic).

The exception to the above rules are:

- Fluorescent yellow markers — These are used to indicate temporary lanes during roadworks on major roads and are glued to the road surface; they are never embedded in it. Any painted markings will be removed from the road surface if they contradict the markers. They are fluorescent yellow in color, so they stand out in the day, but reflect white light at night. Where used, they are much more numerous and dense than standards markers, as they are not used in conjunction with painted lines. They also appear yellow on the edges but reflect red on the left side or amber on the right

==== In North America ====
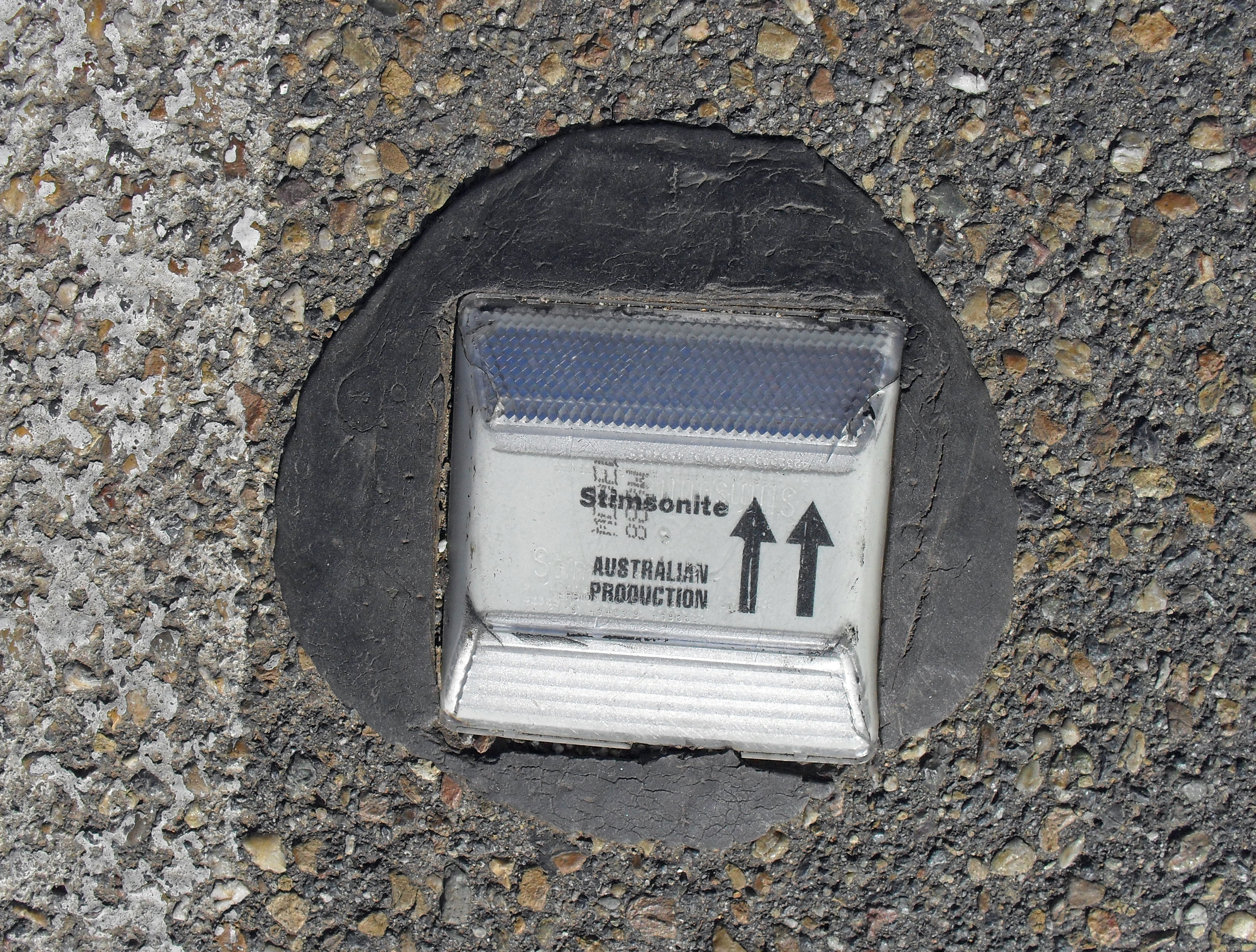
A white retroreflective raised pavement marker (Stimsonite design)

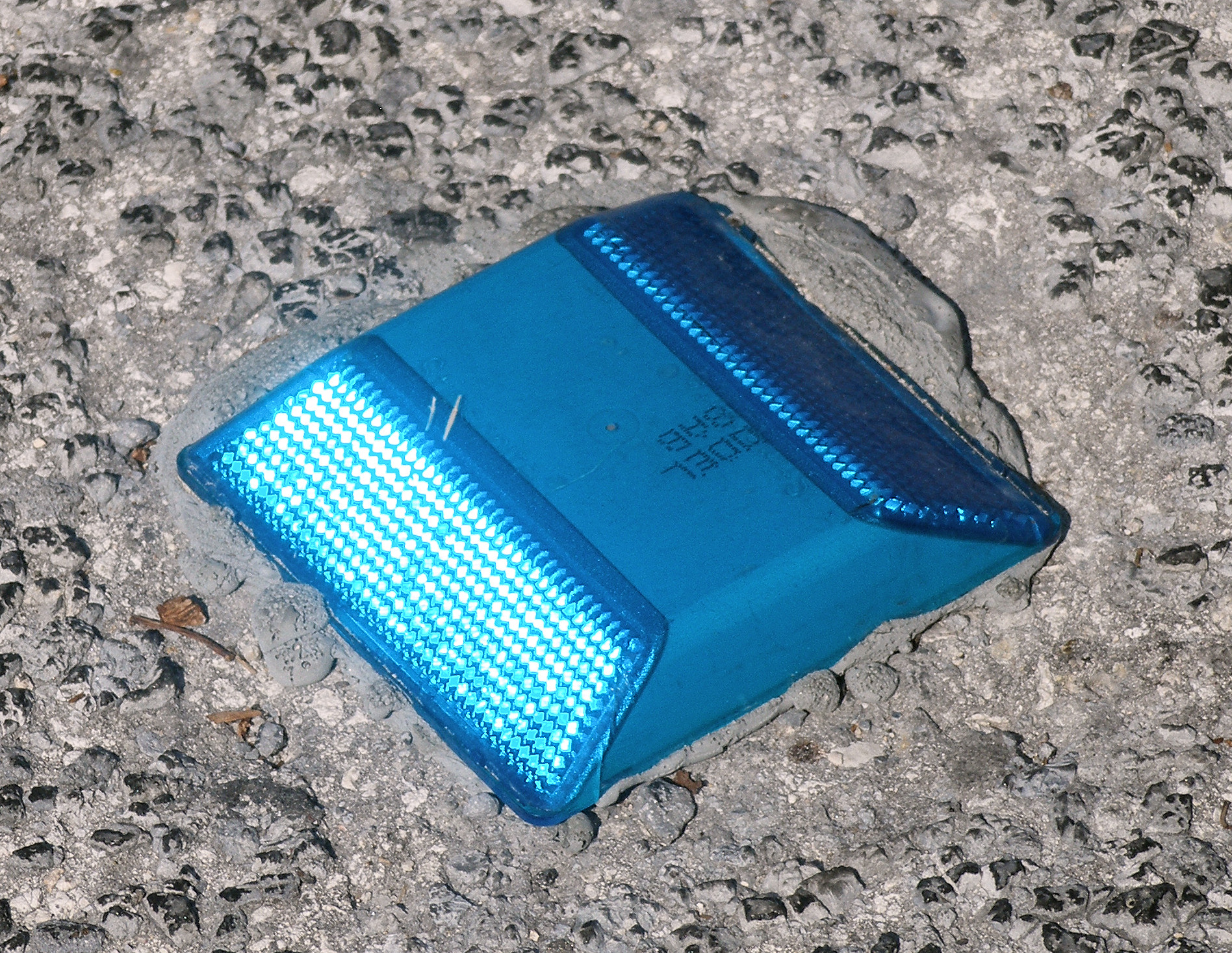
A blue raised pavement marker (for marking the location of fire hydrants)

- White markers — for lane markings or to mark the right pavement edge.
- Yellow or orange markers — These separate traffic moving in opposite directions, or mark the left pavement edge on one-way roadways.
- Blue markers — Usually placed near the center of the roadway, offset to one side to mark the location of fire hydrants on the shoulder or at the curb.
- Green markers — Usually used to indicate that emergency vehicles can open gates to enter a gated community.
- Red markers — Usually indicate areas that are closed to traffic.

Colors can also be combined, with a different color facing each direction:

- White and red or yellow and red — white or yellow for normal use in one direction, and red to indicate "do not enter" or "wrong way" in the other direction. Red-Clear Markers are primarily used to warn motorists they are going the wrong way; most people have never seen these because they show clear when approached in the correct direction, and only appear red to wrong-way drivers.
- White and black — white for marking lane restrictions (such as an HOV diamond) in one direction on a roadway that has "reversible" traffic flow, and black in the other direction when the markings do not apply.

The current trend for lane markings is to intersperse retroreflective paint lines with reflectors as seen on the majority of American highways.

This scheme only applies to the US and Canada. Mexico, on the other hand, generally follows European usage.

==== In Japan ====
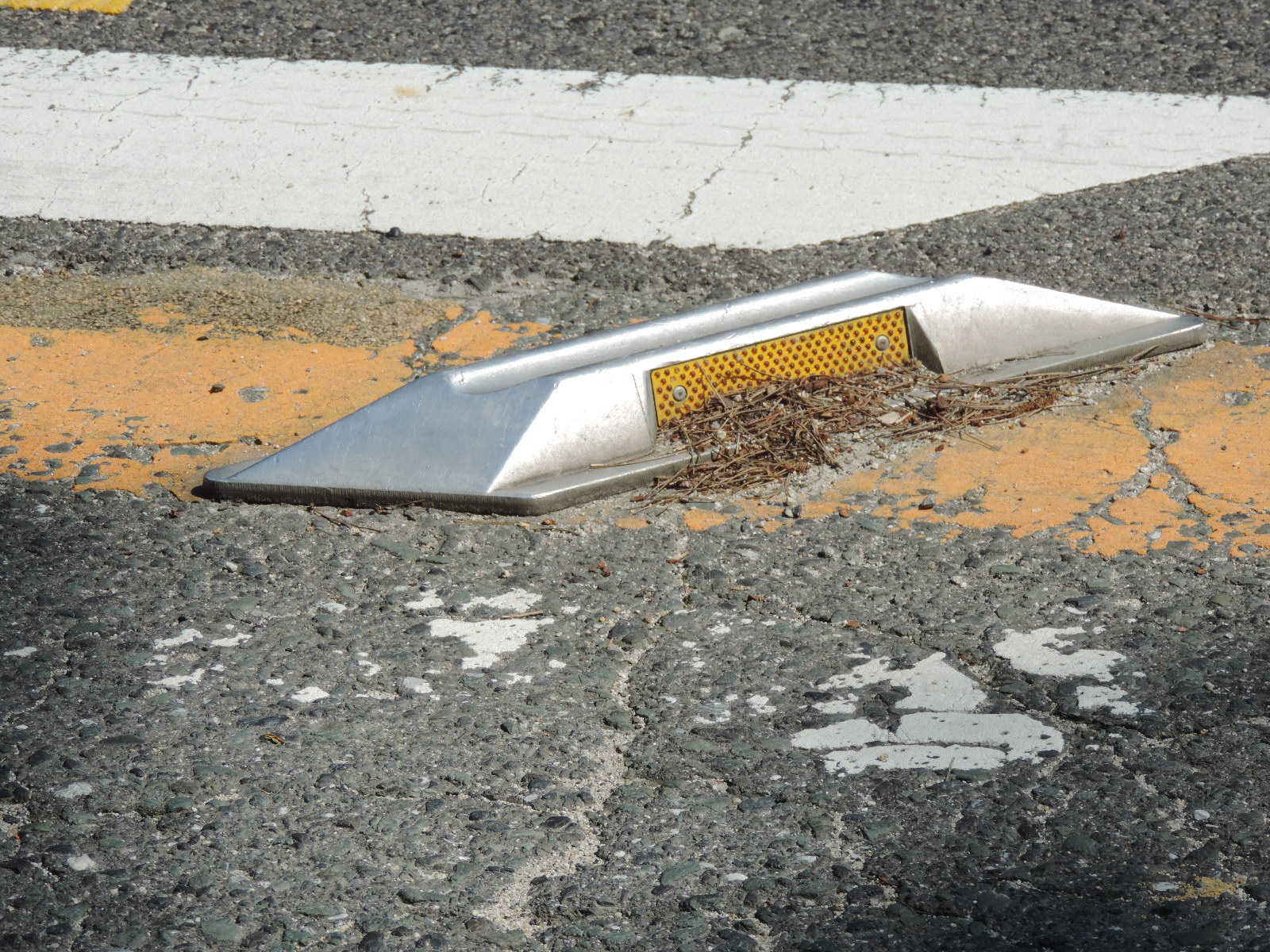
A yellow raised pavement marker in Japan

If marked on the road, the color should match the purpose according to European counterparts. Also, fluorescent yellow markers are used to indicate temporary lanes during roadworks on major roads in Japan.

Two other markers are adopted for use in Japan, taken from North American usage:

- White and red or yellow and red — white or yellow for normal use in one direction, and red to indicate "do not enter" or "wrong way" in the other direction.
- White and black — white for marking lane restrictions in one direction on a roadway that has "reversible" traffic flow, and black in the other direction when the markings do not apply.

The design of the markers is diagonal.

==== In Thailand ====
In Thailand, raised marker colors generally follow European usage but road markings follow the MUTCD. However, Thailand also adopted three uses of marker colors, one different from European usage:

- Blue — Used to mark the location of fire hydrants
- White and red or yellow and red — white or yellow for normal use in one direction, and red to indicate "do not enter" or "wrong way" in the other direction.
- White and black — white for marking lane restrictions in one direction on a roadway that has "reversible" traffic flow, and black in the other direction when the markings do not apply.

Thailand's raised markers use the American design.

==== In the Commonwealth ====
Countries formerly part of the British Empire are likely to retain a modified version of the British laws including the basic principles regarding road safety.

==== In Hong Kong ====
Hong Kong's raised marker colors are identical to those used in the United Kingdom.

- White — For lane markings and central reservation (US: median) on motorways and dual carriageways
- Red, yellow or amber — Lines that should not be crossed. Red is used for the left side of a dual carriageway, while yellow or amber is used for the right side of a dual carriageway.
- Green — A line that may be crossed, such as a slip road or lay-by

==== In Australia ====
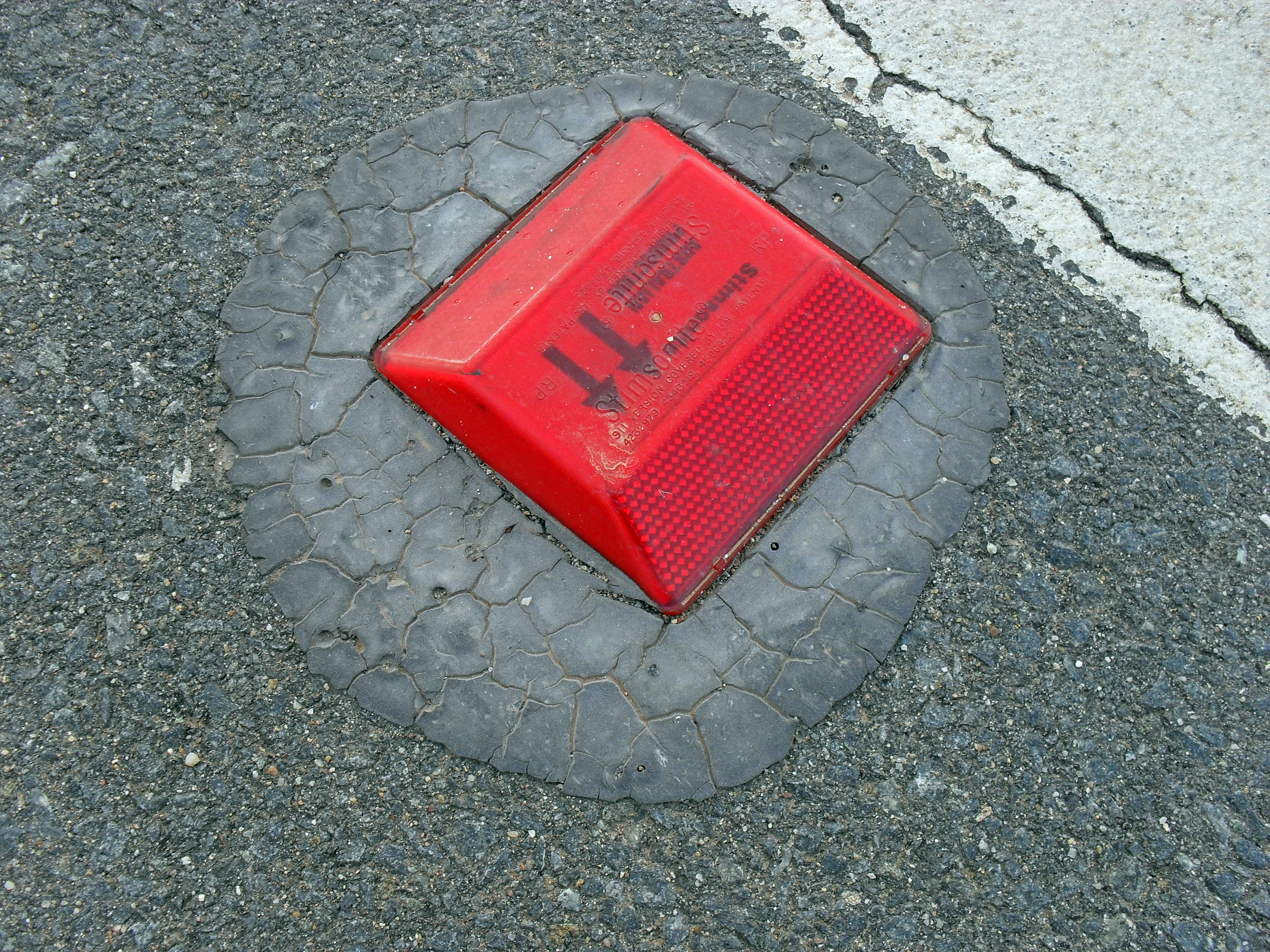
A red raised pavement marker

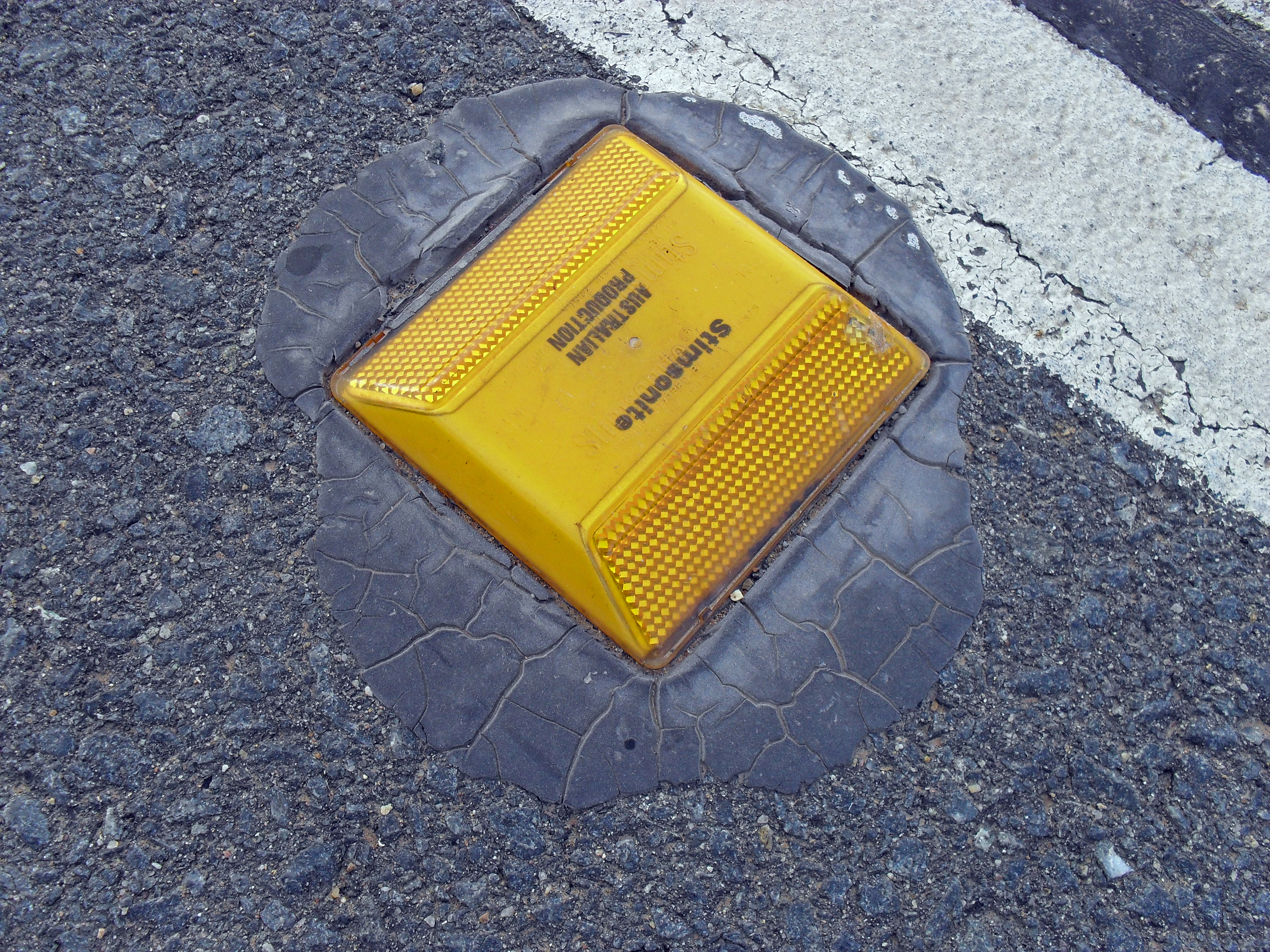
A yellow raised pavement marker used to mark a stop valve

While Australian designs generally follow those in the US, the colors generally follow European usage. Differences from European usage include:

- Blue — Usually used to mark the location of fire hydrants, as in North America
- Yellow — In addition to marking the median of freeways, in Victoria single yellow reflectors are used with broken yellow lines to denote tram tracks on which motorized traffic can drive, and double yellow reflectors are used with solid yellow lines to denote tram tracks on which motorized traffic may not drive other than to cross.

==== In Latin America ====
For countries in Latin America, the colors of raised markers vary by country to country. For most countries, they tend to generally follow the European counterparts rather than North American counterparts, but in several countries of Latin America, such as Mexico, the usage of blue follows the North American counterpart.

=== History ===
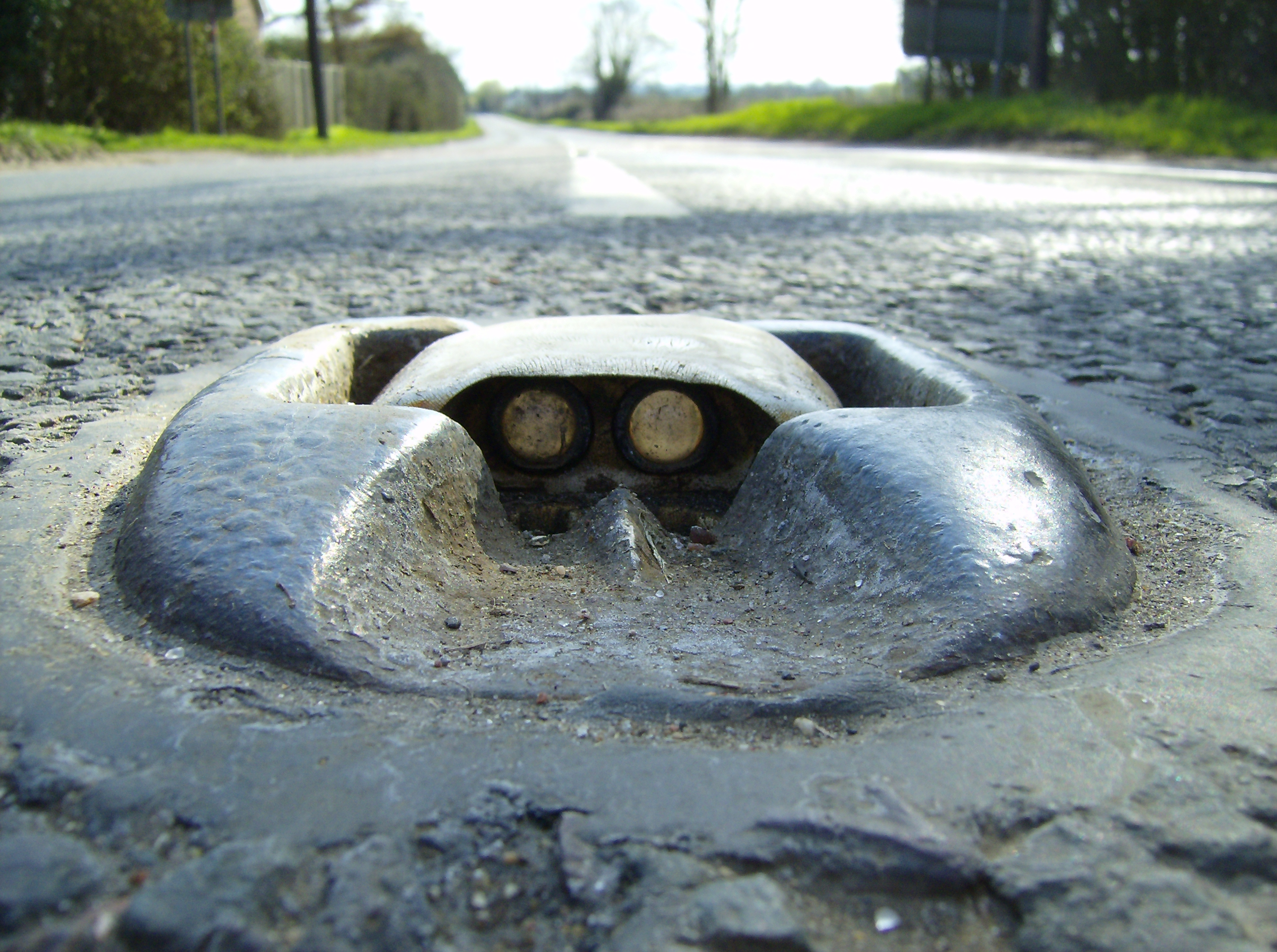
Retroreflective spheres set into a cat's eye in the UK

Cat's eyes made out of metal were the earliest form of retroreflective pavement markers, and are in use in the United Kingdom and other parts of the world. They were invented in the United Kingdom in 1933 by Percy Shaw and patented in 1934 (UK patents 436,290 and 457,536), and the United States in 1939 (US patent 2,146,359). On March 15, 1935, Shaw founded Reflecting Roadstuds Ltd, which became the first manufacturer of raised pavement markers.

The plastic markers now used widely throughout the United States and elsewhere appeared three decades later. They were originally invented by American engineer Sidney A. Heenan in the course of his employment with the Stimsonite Corporation in Niles, Illinois. Heenan filed an application for a patent on October 23, 1964. Patent No. 3,332,327 was subsequently granted on July 25, 1967.

Stimsonite went on to become the leading manufacturer of retroreflective raised pavement markers in the United States and was acquired in 1999 by Avery Dennison Corporation. For six years, Avery sold Stimsonite's line under its Sun Country brand. In 2006, Avery sold its raised pavement marker division to Ennis Paint, one of the largest manufacturers worldwide of paint for pavement markings (particularly lane markings). After a 2020 transaction, PPG Industries now markets the Stimsonite product line under the lengthy name of "Ennis-Flint by PPG Stimsonite". Other manufacturers of retroreflective raised pavement markers sold in the United States under various designs include 3M, Apex Universal, Vialume, and Ray-O-Lite.

== Glass road studs ==
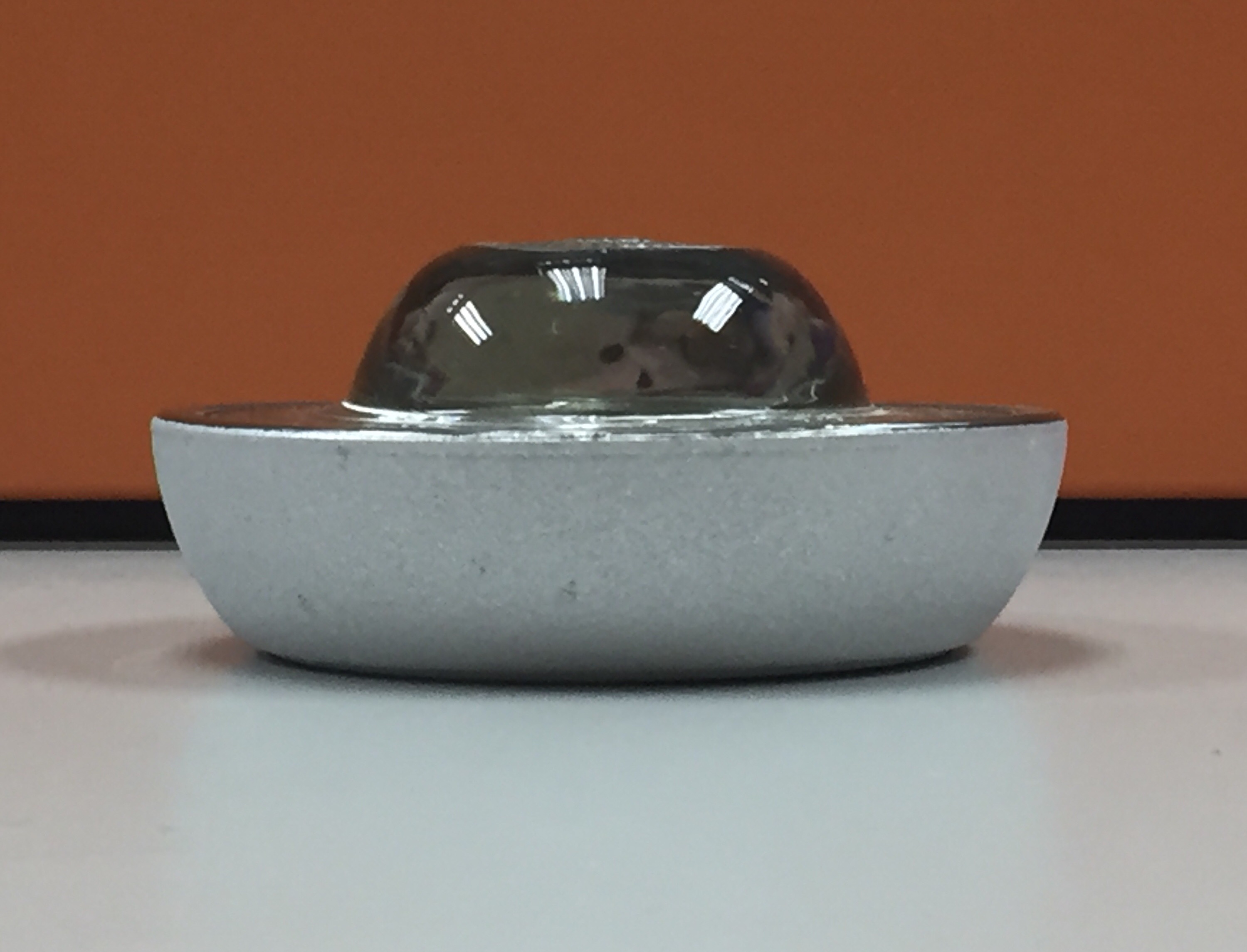
Side view of a glass road stud

Glass road studs have a very special shape: the upper half is a dome shape, and the lower half is a base covered with a reflective layer. They come in a variety of colors and sizes to meet the requirements of different applications. Currently they are widely adopted in Taiwan.

== Cat's eyes ==
Cat's eyes, in their original form, consist of two pairs of retroreflective glass spheres set into a white rubber dome, mounted in a cast-iron housing. They generally come in a variety of colors. They have enjoyed widespread usage in the British Isles and elsewhere around the world.

== Botts' dots ==
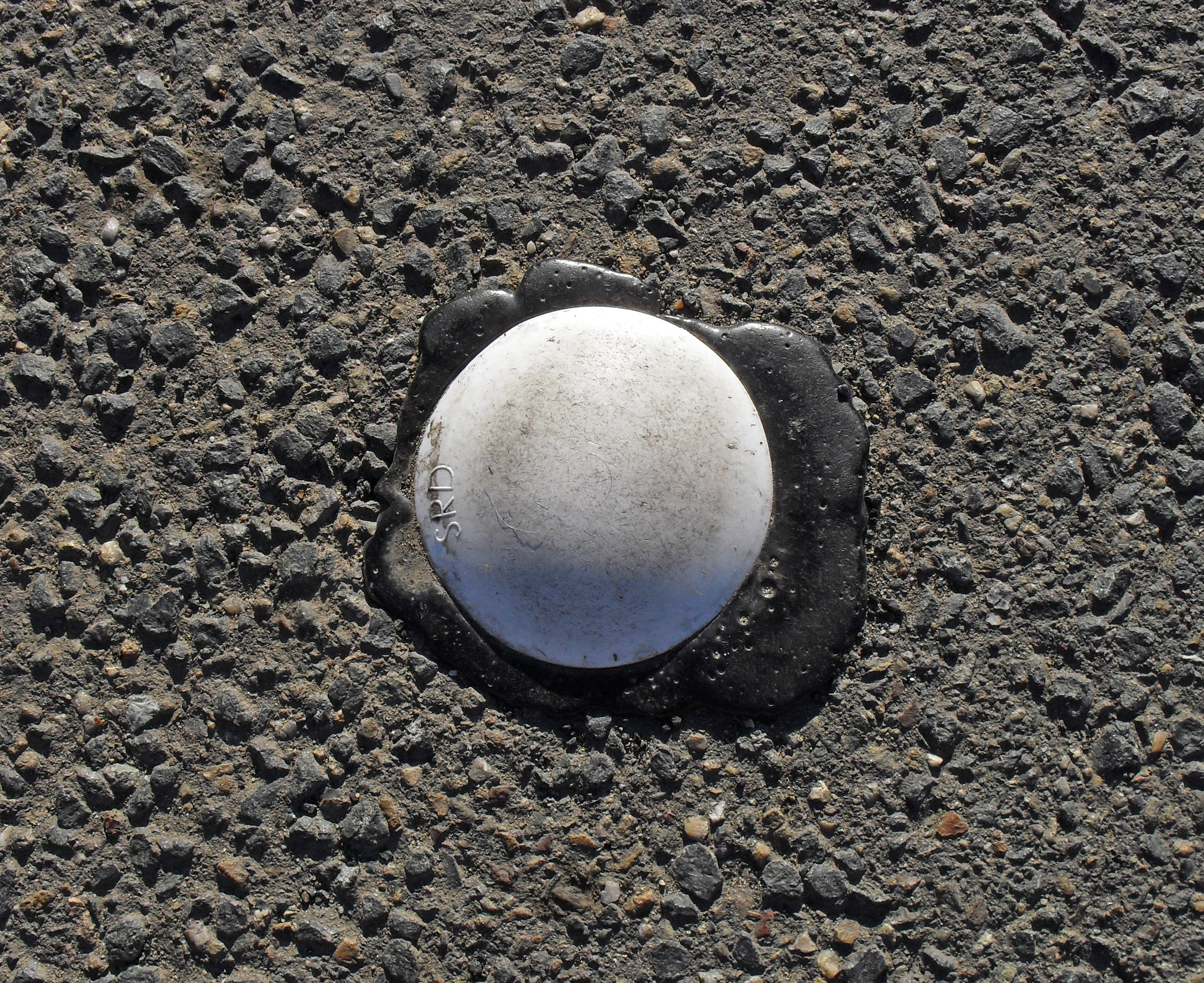
A round, white Botts' dot

Nonreflective raised pavement markers (also known as Botts' dots) are usually round, are white or yellow, and are frequently used on highways and interstates in lieu of painted lines. They are glued to the road surface with epoxy and as such are not suitable in areas where snow plowing is conducted. They are usually made out of plastic or ceramic materials.

== Pedestrian crossing studs ==
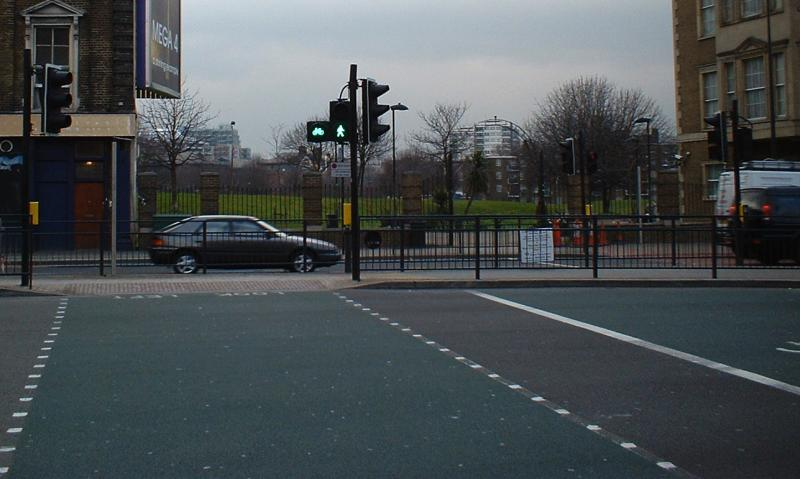
A Toucan crossing with markers visible. In this case thermoplastic paint has been used.

In the UK, the area in which pedestrians should cross at pelican crossings is marked out by a series of markers. Usually, these are painted as squares on the road but occasionally a metal stud is used. These are usually square and made from unpainted steel or aluminum.

== Delineator ==
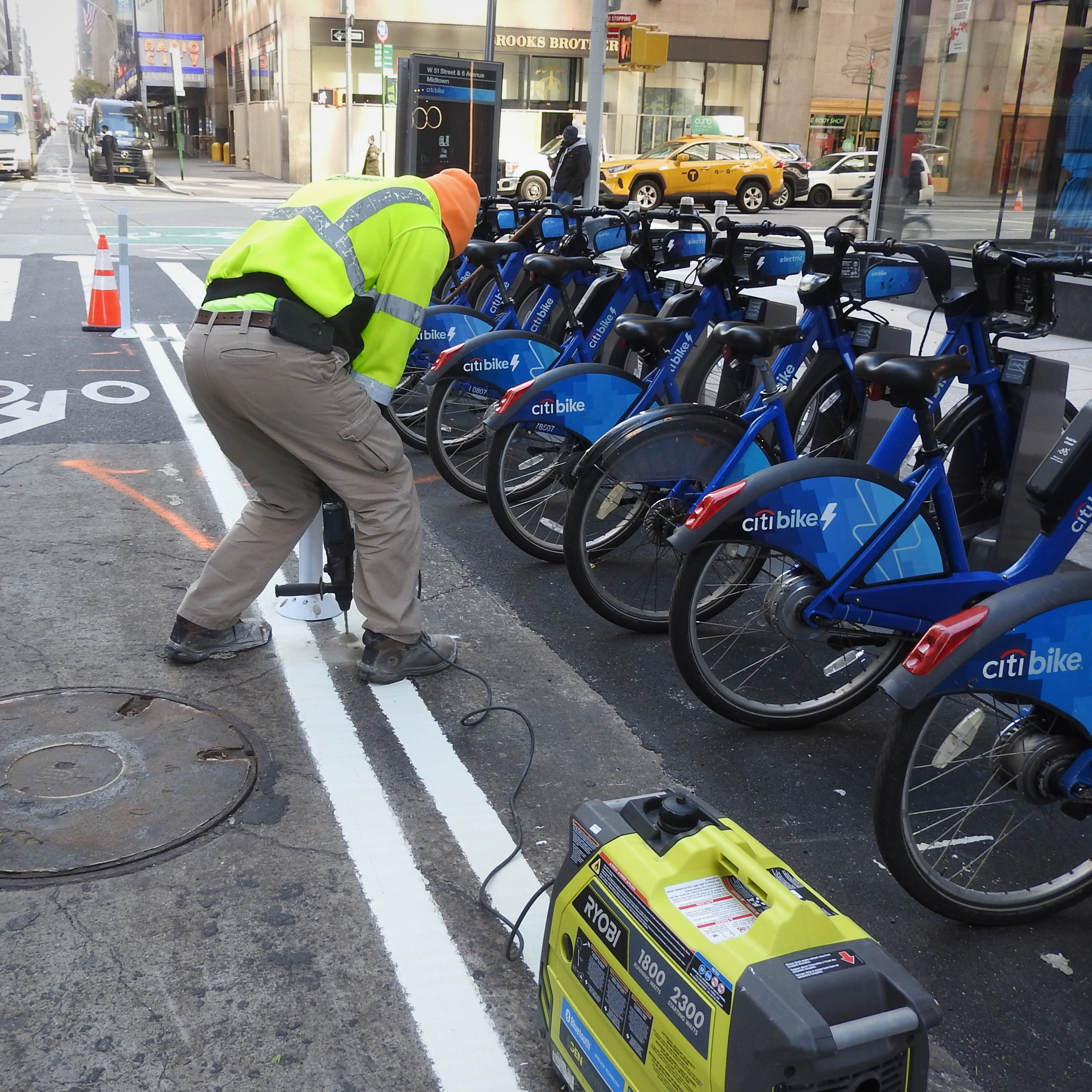
Drilling to install a delineator

Delineators are tall pylons (similar to traffic cones or bollards) mounted on the road surface, or along the edge of a road, and are used to channelize traffic. These are a form of raised pavement marker but unlike most such markers, delineators are not supposed to be hit except by out-of-control or drifting vehicles. Unlike their smaller cousins, delineators are tall enough to impact not only a vehicle's tires but the vehicle body itself. They usually contain one or more retroreflective strips. They can be round and open in the center or curved (45-degree sections) of plastic with a reflective strip. They are also used in low reflective markers in a "T" shape. They can also be used to indicate lane closures as in cases where the number of lanes is reduced.

Delineators are often used in snow-prone areas in lieu of raised pavement markings as the latter can be easily dislodged from the road surface by snowplows. In addition to marking the road edge, delineators are used to mark ramp gores, medians, and objects near the roadway such as fire hydrants. In such areas, the height of the delineators is established based on the typical amount of snowfall the area receives, ranging from 4 feet to more than 8 feet in height in areas with extreme snow depths.

The name "delineator" is also used for reflective devices attached to other objects which are technically not pavement markers.

== See also ==
- Road surface marking
- Rumble strips
