= Road surface marking =

Any kind of device or material used on a road surface to convey official information

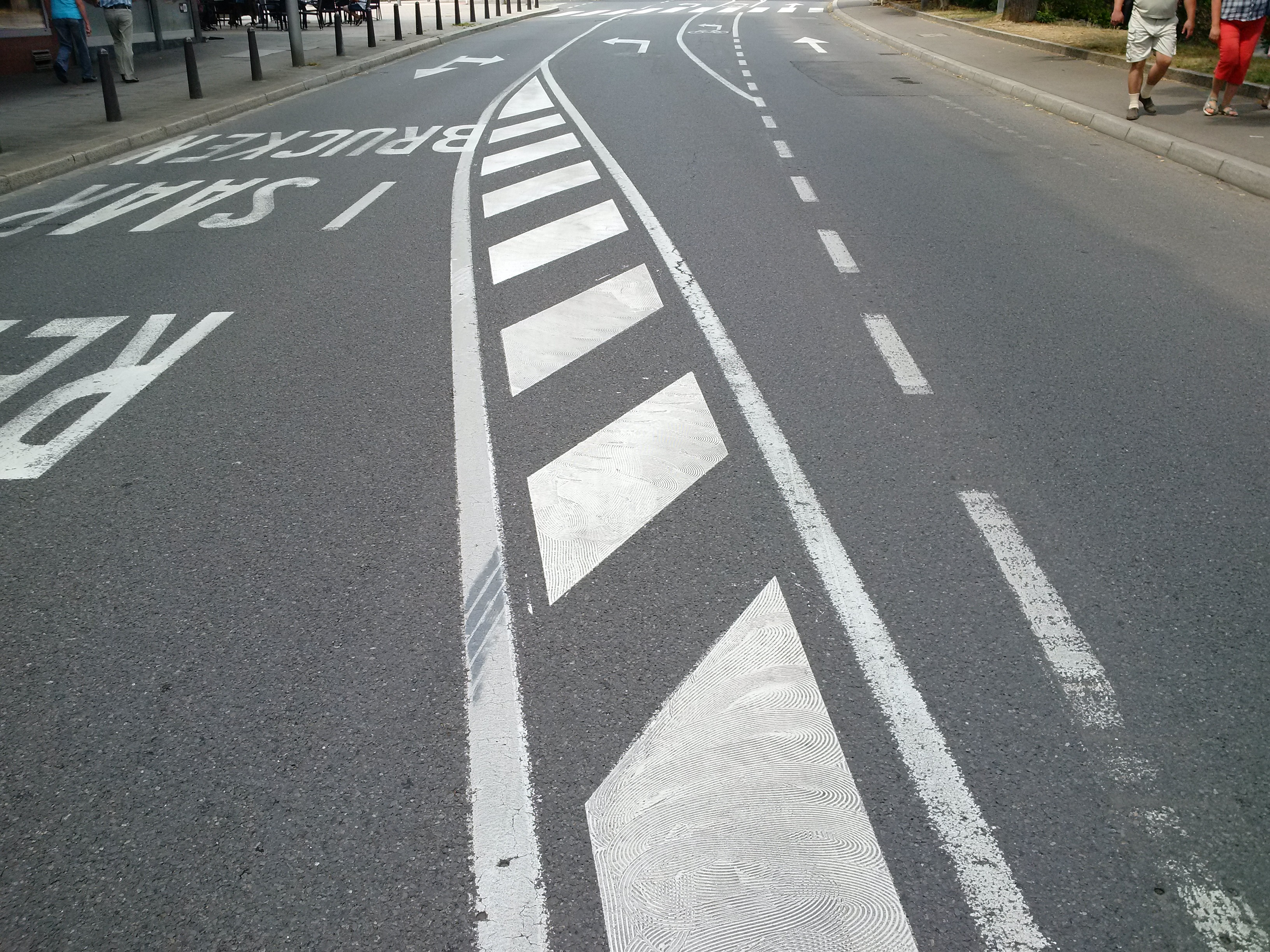
Variety of painted surface markings on a road in Luxembourg

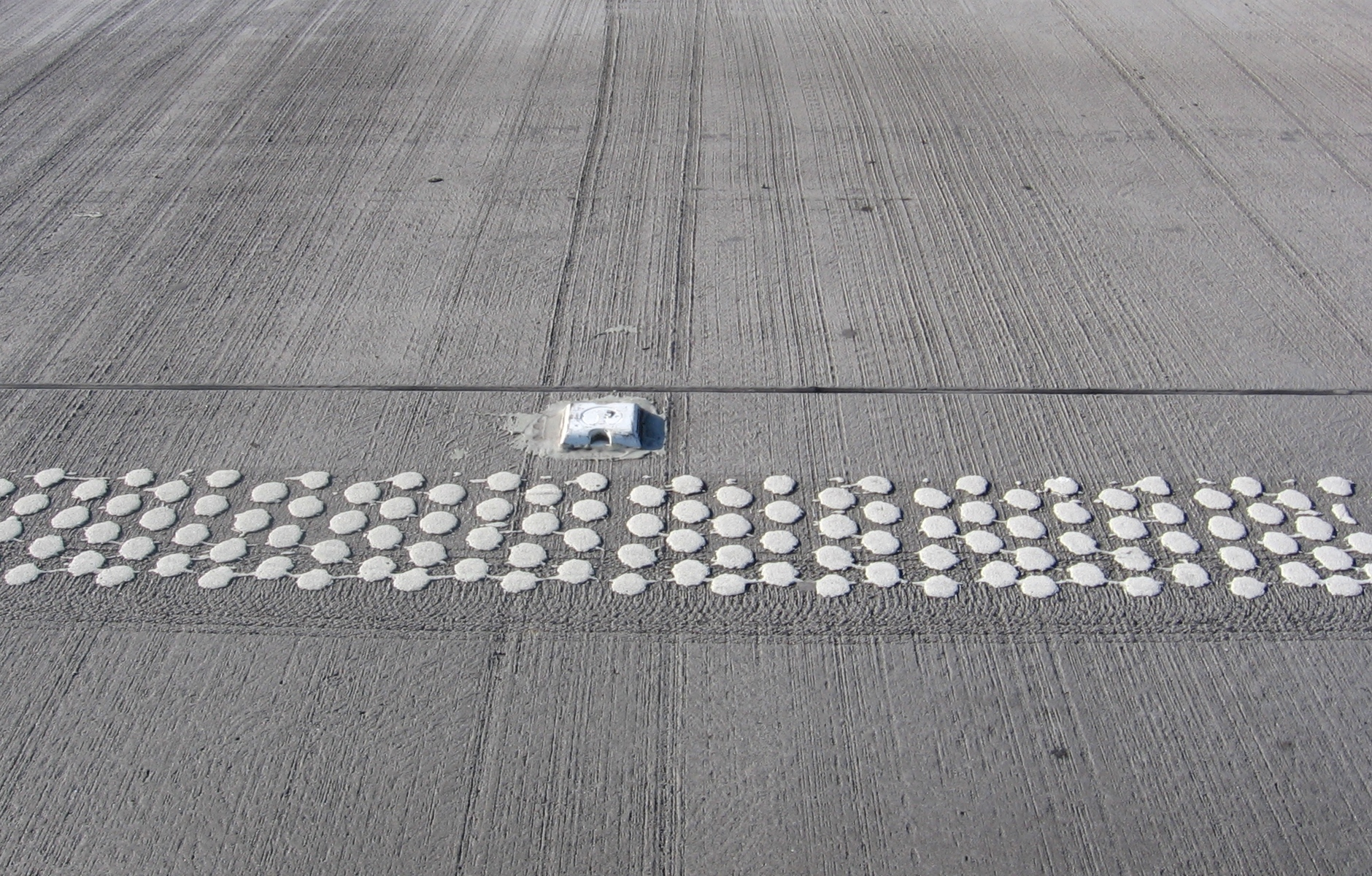
White raised pavement marker near "pea-structure" side-line on highway surface in Poland

Road surface marking is any kind of device or material that is used on a road surface in order to convey official information; they are commonly placed with road marking machines (also referred to as road marking equipment or pavement marking equipment). They can also be applied in other facilities used by vehicles to mark parking spaces or designate areas for other uses. In some countries and areas (France, Italy, Czech Republic, Slovakia etc.), road markings are conceived as horizontal traffic signs, as opposed to vertical traffic signs placed on posts.

Road surface markings are used on paved roadways to provide guidance and information to drivers and pedestrians. Uniformity of the markings is an important factor in minimising confusion and uncertainty about their meaning, and efforts exist to standardise such markings across borders. However, countries and areas categorise and specify road surface markings in different ways—white lines are called white lines mechanical, non-mechanical, or temporary. They can be used to delineate traffic lanes, inform motorists and pedestrians or serve as noise generators when run across a road, or attempt to wake a sleeping driver when installed in the shoulders of a road. Road surface marking can also indicate regulations for parking and stopping.

There is continuous effort to improve the road marking system, and technological breakthroughs include adding retroreflectivity, increasing longevity, and lowering installation cost.

Today, road markings are used to convey a range of information to the driver spanning navigational, safety and enforcement issues leading to their use in road environment understanding within advanced driver-assistance systems and consideration for future use in autonomous road vehicles.

== Construction ==
=== Mechanical markers ===
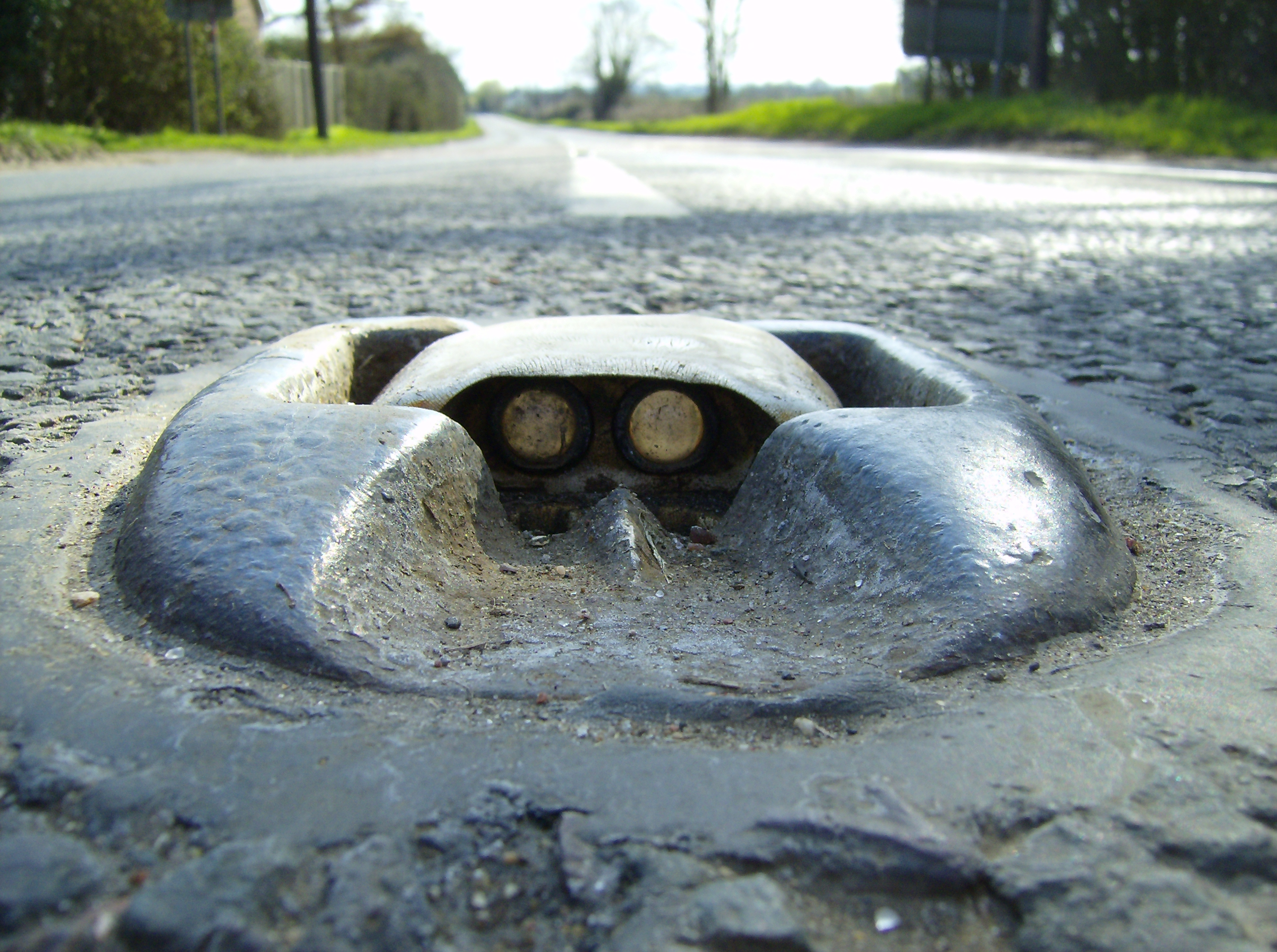
The cat's eye, showing the iron base, rubber housing and lenses

Mechanical devices may be raised or recessed into the road surface, and either reflective or non-reflective. Most are permanent; some are movable.

- Cat's eye, invented by Percy Shaw in the 1930s, cat's eyes equip many major routes in the British Isles. They consist of four reflective lenses mounted in a durable white rubber housing, two facing fore and two facing aft. The housing is mounted within a cast iron shoe, which the rubber housing sinks in to when driven over. This provides protection from snow ploughing and allows the lenses to be self-cleaning—they pass a rubber blade when depressed. The lenses are available in a variety of different colours: mainly white, yellow/orange, green, red, and blue.
- Botts' dots (low rounded white or yellow dots), named for the California Caltrans engineer Elbert Botts, who invented the epoxy that keeps them glued down, are one type of a mechanical non-reflective raised marker. Generally they are used to mark the edges of traffic lanes, frequently in conjunction with raised reflective markers. Botts' dots are also used across a travel lane to draw the drivers attention to the road. They are frequently used in this way to alert drivers to toll booths, school zones or other significant reduction of speed limit. They are normally only used in warm climates since snow ploughs usually remove them along with the snow.
- Rumble strips are commonly used for the same purpose. A rumble strip can be a series of simple troughs, typically 1 cm (0.4 in) deep and 10 cm (4 in) wide, that is ground out of the asphalt. Other alternatives, similar to the Botts' dots, use raised strips, painted or glued to the surface. A specific form of raised strips using thermoplastic is called profile thermoplastic markings. The markings are created by fusing thermoplastic to the pavement and create alternating elevation and recession pattern. This can be done as inverted-profile markings or raised-profile markings. Inverted-profile markings are created by pressing a cog rolling over the markings while they are wet to make them corrugated. Raised-profile markings are created by extruding extra thickness of thermoplastic at a specific interval to create bumps. Raised-profile markings are sometime known as convex traffic lines. Uses of rumble strips can be across the travel direction (to warn of hazards ahead) or along the travel direction (to warn of hazards of not staying within a specific lane). Their main way of function is creating a strong vibration when driven over that will alert a driver to various upcoming hazards both by sound and the physical vibration of the vehicle. A musical road uses specific patterns of these vibrations to produce music.
- Reflective markers are used as travel lane dividers, to mark the central reservation (median) or to mark exit slip-roads. Incorporating a raised retro-reflective element, they are typically more visible at night and in inclement weather than standard road marking lines. The colour of markers varies depending on the country of use; freeways in the United States often use reflectors manufactured to appear white to drivers proceeding in the proper direction of travel, and appear red on the reverse to warn drivers that they are proceeding against the proper direction of travel, creating a danger of a head-on collision. Reflective markers are also referred to as raised pavement markers, road studs, and sometimes (generically) in the UK and Ireland as cat's eye, although this name refers to one particular brand of product. These markers can be used for other purposes such as marking the locations of fire hydrants (blue) or at gates of gated communities to indicate that emergency service vehicles have a code or device that allows them to open the gate. In the United Kingdom and elsewhere, raised markers are used to mark pedestrian crossings to assist the blind in crossing streets. In colder climates, reflective markers may be installed below ground using an elongated narrow triangle, cut into the road surface that allows the device to be installed below the road surface. Newer technology allows these to be placed above ground with snowplough-able rails that attempt to protect the reflective components from the snowplough blade.

==== Confusion with marks left by roadwork ====
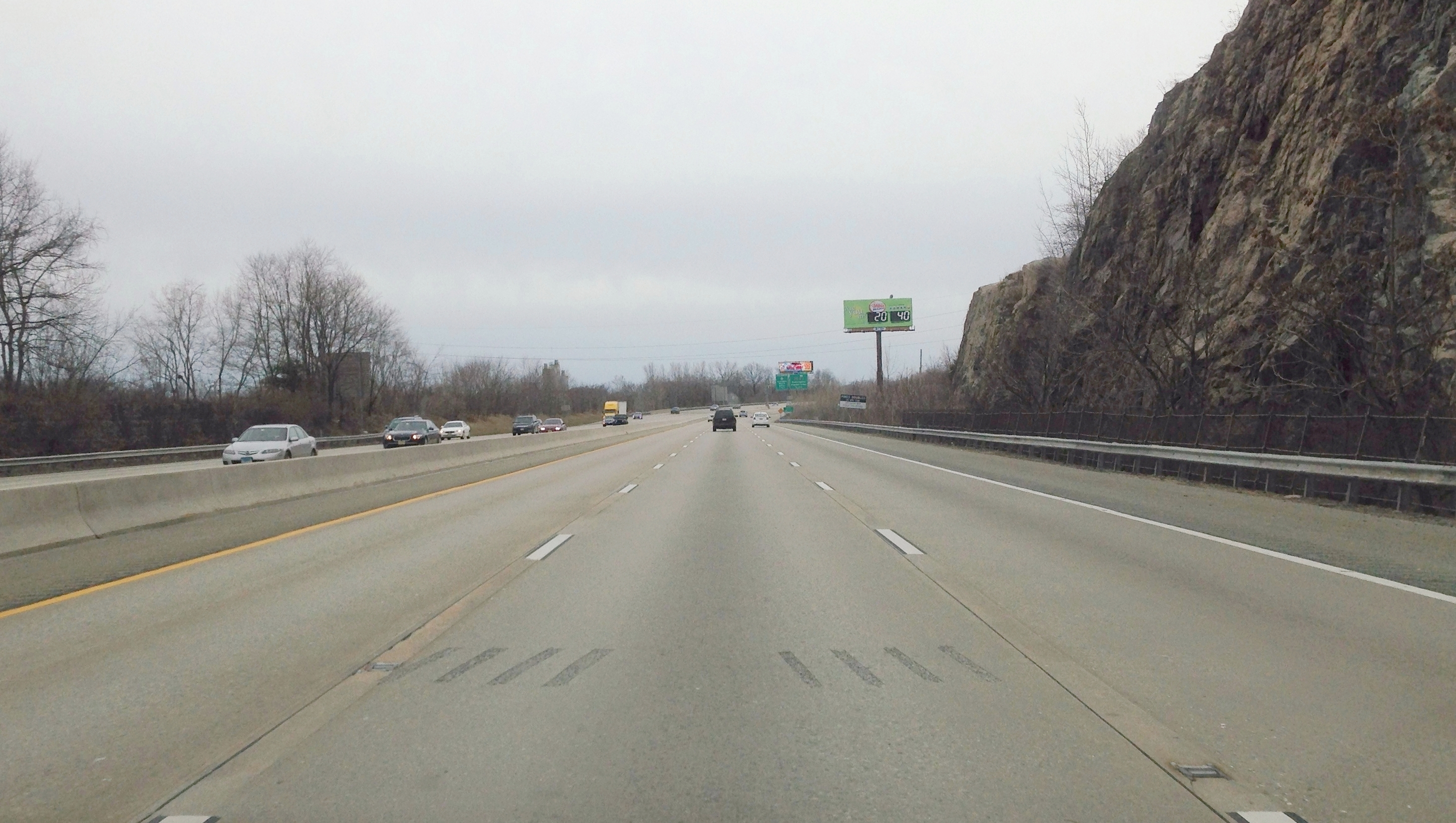
Typical dash marks in the middle of the lane after dowel bar retrofit roadwork

Sometimes the result of roadwork may leave visible marks on the pavements. An example is the dowel bar retrofit process to reinforce concrete slabs in order to extend the life of older concrete pavements. The completion of the process leaves a symmetrical pattern of dash marks on the roadway, as if there were an associated meaning to the pattern. When there are many of them along the roadway, motorists may interpret the marks as an unknown form of mechanical markers or strange road surface markings. When roads are under construction and the lanes are shifted laterally, those marks may interfere with temporary lane markings. As the marks from the dowel bar retrofit are not intended to be any form of road surface markings, the responsible agencies try to make these marks less visible to the motorists.

Some municipalities require contractors to install utility repair tags to identify responsible parties of the patches that fill utility cuts. The colour-coded tags are visible on the road surface.

=== Non-mechanical markers ===
==== Marker types ====
===== Paint =====
Countries by the colours of the centre line on roads Uses white for the centre line Uses yellow for the centre line Uses both white and yellow for the centre line Unknown / Insufficient information

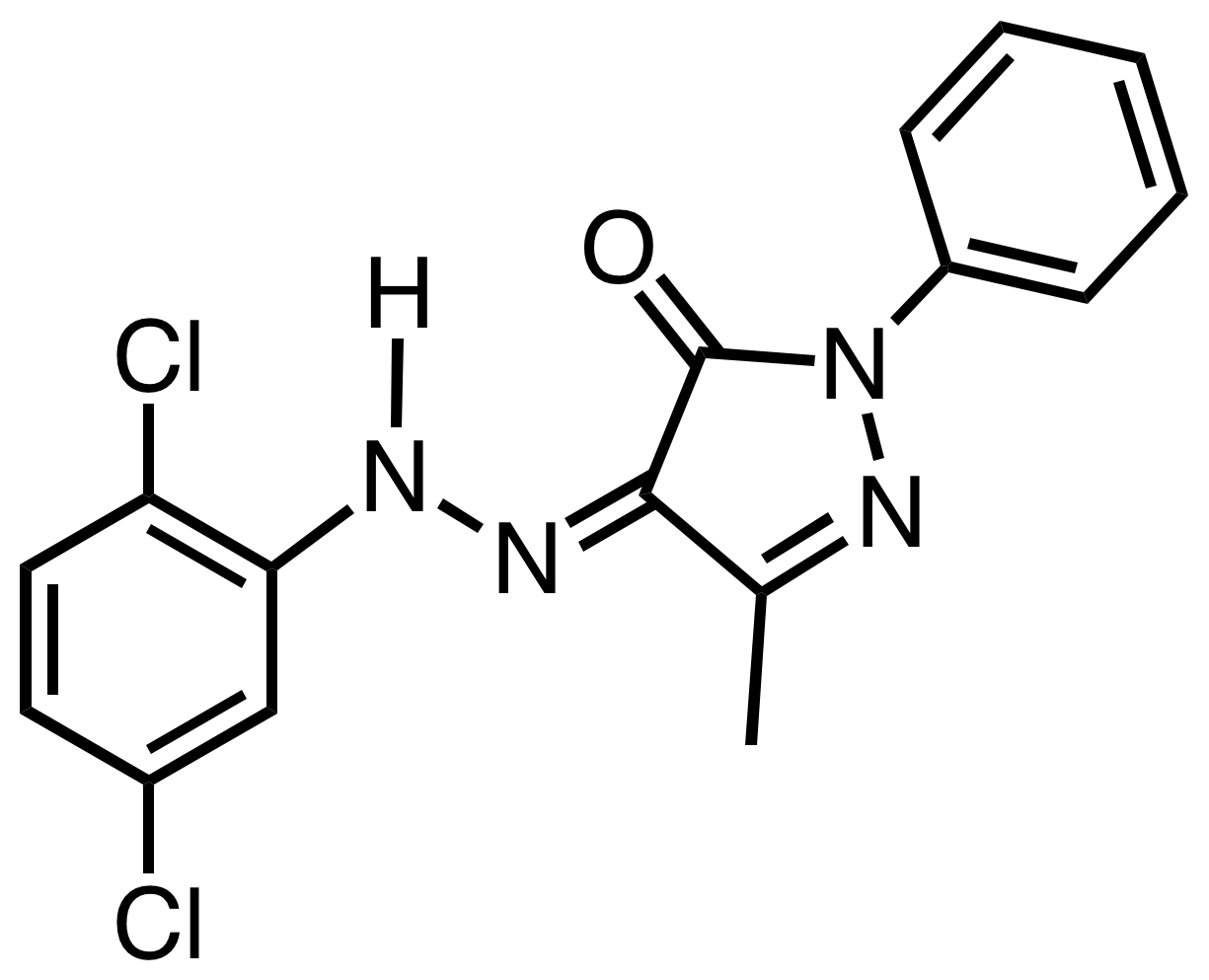
Pigment Yellow 10 is a common yellow colourant used for road marking on U.S. highways.

Paint, sometimes with additives such as retroreflective glass beads, is generally used to mark travel lanes. It is also used to mark spaces in parking lots or special purpose spaces for disabled parking, loading zones, or time-restricted parking areas. Colours for these applications vary by locality. Paint is a low-cost marking and has been in widespread use since approximately the early 1950s.

Paint consists of three main components: pigments, resins or binders, and water or solvents. Pigments are finely grounded materials that give out colours or block out the surface beneath it. They may contain other materials such as UV stabiliser, and fillers that bring out the colour pigments (yellow, white, orange, and light blue) to the required level. Resins or binders are the glue of the paint to bind pigment and glass beads together to the road surface. The resins for water-based paints are polyvinyl acetate latex, methyl methacrylate or acrylic resin. The resins for solvent-based paints are linseed or soya oils and alkyd resins. The pigments and resins are mixed with water for water-based paints and solvents for solvent-based paints so that they can be applied onto the road surface. Solvents include naphtha, toluene, methanol, methylene chloride, and acetone. Due to environmental concerns, some jurisdictions may have restrictions on solvent-based paints.

Paint is usually applied right after the road has been paved. The road is marked commonly by a truck called a "striper." These trucks contain hundreds of gallons of paint stored in huge drums which sit on the bed. The markings are controlled manually or automatically by the controller who sits on the bed. Paint is run through a series of hoses under air pressure and applied to the roadway surface along with the application of glass beads for retroreflectivity. After application, the paint dries fairly quickly. Sometimes the glass beads are mixed in with the paint and applied together. However, a more recommended method is to use a separate gun to spray the glass beads on to the wet paint during the application.

Painted symbols, such as turn-lane arrows or HOV lane markers, are applied manually using stencils. Painted markings usually last 9 to 36 months. Some water-based paints can be applied at double the level of thickness of typical latex paints to extend the life of the markings.

===== Stones =====
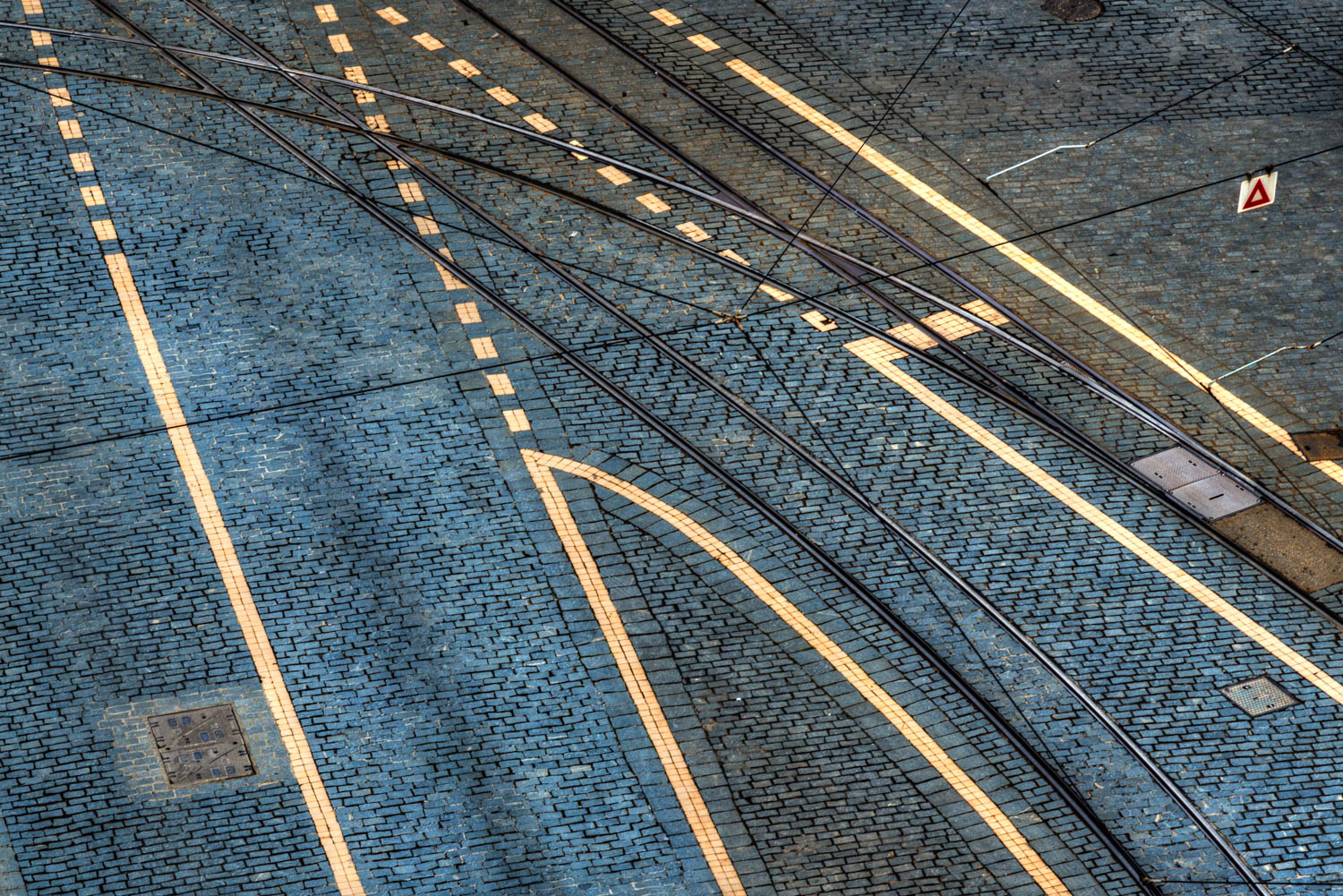
Stone traffic lane markings in Lisbon, Portugal

In roads paved with setts (as in Belgian/Italian or Portuguese styles) or cobblestones, markings can be made with white blocks or stones, like marble or other light-coloured rocks. This kind of marking is long-lasting, but can be slippery in rain or wet conditions unless surfaced with a matte or rough finish.

==== Thermoplastic ====
One of the most common types of road marking based on its balance between cost and performance longevity, thermoplastic binder systems are generally based on one of three core chemistries: hydrocarbons, rosin esters or maleic modified rosin esters (MMRE). Thermoplastic coatings are generally homogeneous dry mixes of binder resins, plasticisers, glass beads (or other optics), pigments, and fillers. Their use has increased over paints mainly due to the performance benefits of increased durability, retro-reflectivity, and a lack of VOC solvents.

Thermoplastic markings are applied using specially designed vehicles. Usually, thermoplastic marking mode is applied by machine to coat traffic lines, afree preheating by a device commonly called a preheater. The thermoplastic mix is heated in trucks to about 200 °C (400 °F)] before being fed to the application apparatus. This is often a screed box or ribbon gun. Immediately after the thermoplastic has been applied, glass beads are laid onto the hot material so that they embed before the plastic hardens. These beads provide initial retroreflection. As the marking wears during use and the initial beads are lost, the beads mixed with the binder are uncovered, providing long-term retroreflectivity. These can be made exceptionally thick to produce a rumble strip effect.

The thermoplastic marking coating sets quickly. The melt adhesion of a synthetic resin makes hot-melt paint adhere strongly to the road surface. Additives in the coating paint increases the coating plasticity, improving the anti-settling, anti-pollution, and anti-tarnish qualities. Thermoplastic marking paint is most commonly produced in yellow and white. The white marking paint mainly contains titanium white, zinc oxide, and lithopone, while the yellow paint is mainly heat-yellowing lead.

In warm climate areas, the thermoplastic markings can last three to six years. However, snowploughs can damage the thermoplastics, limiting usage in cold-climate areas. The filling materials of road paint can affect the mechanical strength, abrasion resistance and hue of the coating film. The particle size of the paint powder influences the flow, sedimentation, and the surface processing.

===== Preformed thermoplastic =====
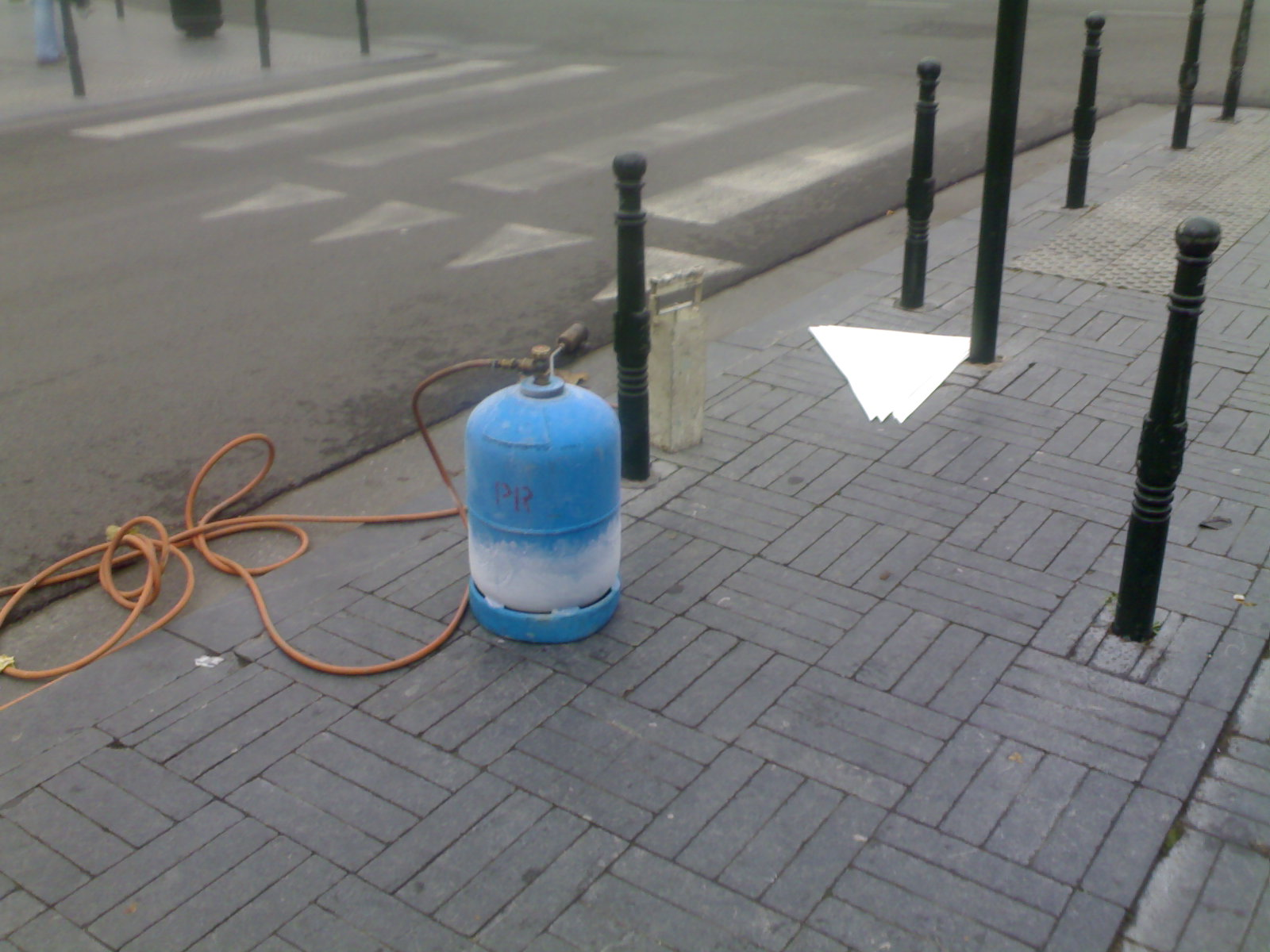
Preformed thermoplastic markings ready to be applied to the road surface with a blow torch in Brussels, Belgium

Preformed thermoplastic pavement markings (sometime called "tape", but not to be confused with preformed polymer tape) are thermoplastic cut into the final shapes by the manufacturers and ready to position onto an asphalt or concrete pavement surface. Preformed thermoplastics are put into place on the road surface and applied using a propane heat torch. Some models require heating the road surface prior to the placement of the preformed thermoplastics. These markings are used primarily because of their durability and cost-effective service life. Since the plastics are melted into the surface, they are not easily damaged by snowploughs. Typically, the preformed thermoplastic markings can last 3 to 6 years. The most common applications of preformed thermoplastic pavement markings are found at intersections as transverse markings such as stop lines, legends, crosswalks, arrows, bike lane symbols, and accessibility symbols.

===== Preformed polymer tape =====
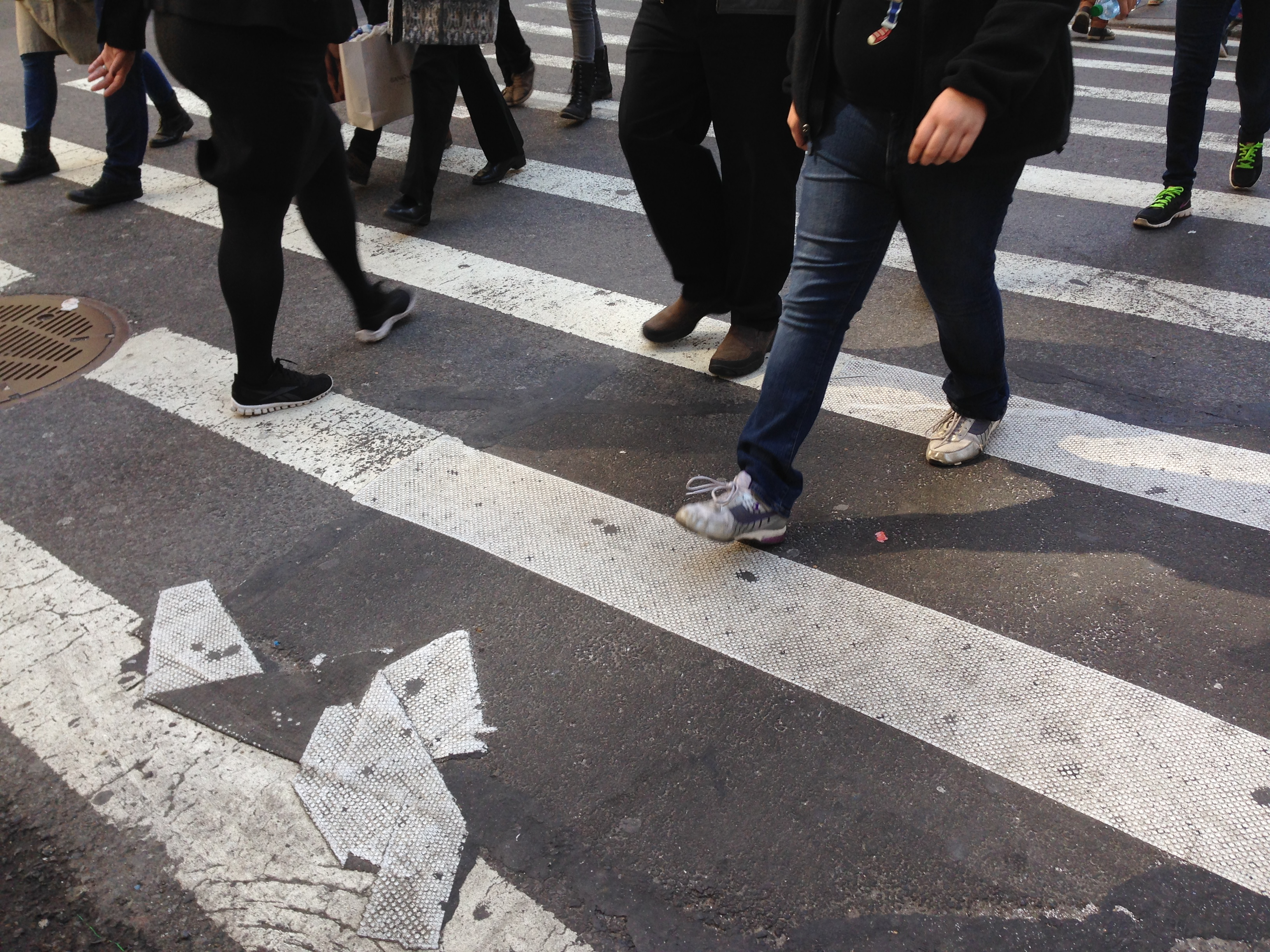
Preformed polymer tapes used for crosswalk markings on a New York city street (notice tape failure on lower leftmost stripe)

Commonly referred to as tape or cold plastic, this product is heavy-grade material with reflective beads embedded in the plastic. It is commonly used to mark crosswalks, stop bars, and traffic guidance such as turn lanes, HOV lanes, train crossings, pedestrian crossings, taxi lanes, bus lanes, and bike lanes. There are two ways to apply tape:

- Overlay: The application being laid over the surface of the pavement. Using industrial-grade rubber cement, once the tape is combined with the pavement, it should last three years. Major obstacles to estimated life are snowploughs, salt, and misapplication.
- Inlay: The tape physically becomes part of the asphalt. Using the heat generated in the paving process, road workers lay special tape on the asphalt in the hardening process, and rollers compress the two together.

The life of the preformed polymer tapes can vary based on the applications. If applied correctly, they can last between 4 and 8 years. However, there have been cases where tape failures start soon after the installation. Conditions that may contribute to tape failure are cold weather at installation, surface preparation, and workmanship. A technique to minimise the tape being scraped off by snowploughs is sandblasting a groove into the surface and fixing the tape onto this groove. This technique diminishes the advantage of low labor cost of the tapes. The preformed polymer tape markings are slippery when wet, especially in large sections such as crosswalks, and caution should be used due to poor wet traction.

===== Epoxy =====
Epoxy consists of parts: a pigmented resin base and catalyst. The two parts are mixed in a specialised truck for epoxy marking application. The epoxy is then heated prior to spraying onto road surface. Retroreflective glass beads are applied using a separate bead gun behind the epoxy spray gun. Typically, epoxy markings last about four years.

Epoxy has been in use since the late 1970s and has gained popularity over the 1990s as the technology has become more affordable and reliable. This material competes directly with plastic with respect to usage and cost.

==== Glass beads ====
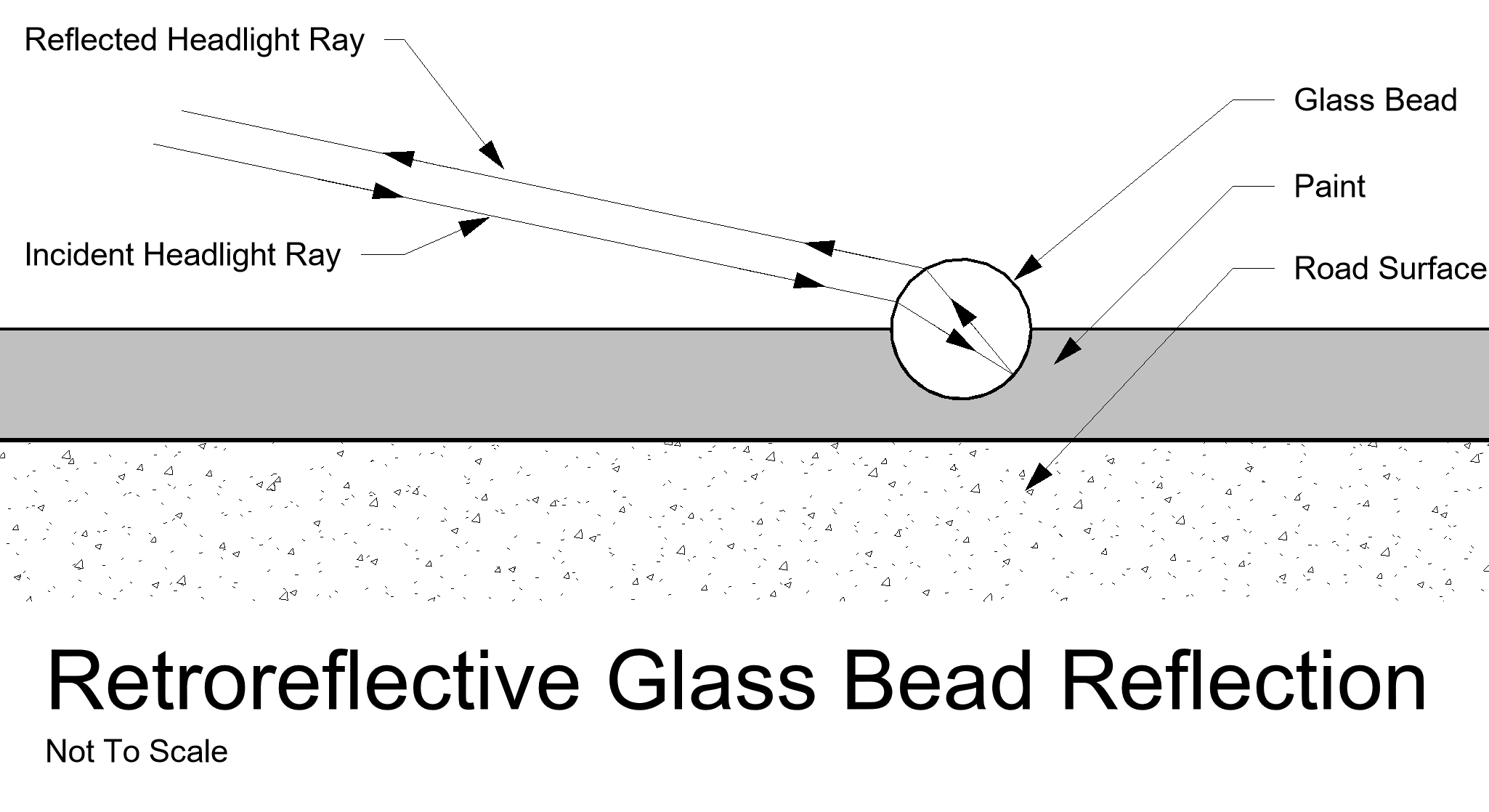
Incident light is refracted within glass beads on road surfaces and reflected into the driver's field of view.

Glass beads composed of soda lime glass are essential for providing retroreflectivity in many kinds of road markings. Retroreflectivity occurs when incident light from vehicles is refracted within glass beads that are embedded in road markings and then reflected back into the driver's field of view.

To install glass beads, line painters often use hand dispensers or glass bead dispensers. No matter what tool they use, the line paint should be wet when applying the reflective glass. It is important that the reflective glass beads not be mixed with paint. They must sit on top of the paint to catch the light from the vehicles.

In the United States, the demand for glass beads has led to importing from countries using outdated manufacturing regulations and techniques. These techniques include the use of heavy metals such as arsenic, antimony, and lead during the manufacturing process as decolourising and fining agents. It has been found that the heavy metals become incorporated into the bead's glass matrix and may leach under environmental conditions that roads experience.

Abrasion may dislodge these beads from the road marking itself, and the reaction of these beads with an aqueous environment vastly accelerates their decomposition and heavy metal release. During both routine road marking removal and harsh environmental conditions, these glass beads can degrade and leach incorporated heavy metals. There are other, non-toxic metals that can achieve the same results. These may include zirconium, tungsten, titanium, and barium.

==== Negative impacts to road surface ====
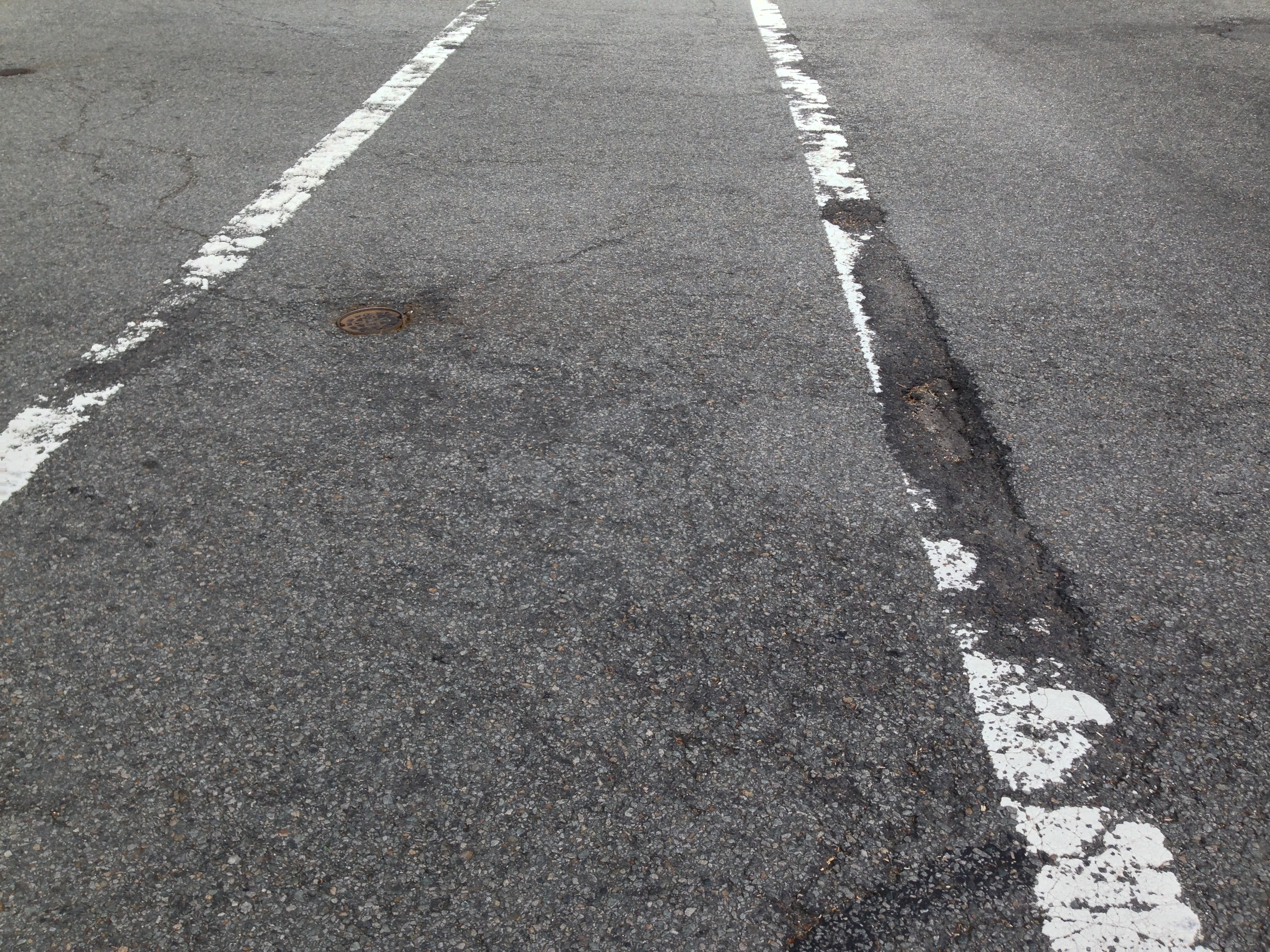
Road surface raveling and potholes found exclusively along pavement markings

Non-mechanical markers are found to contribute to the deterioration of asphalt concrete road surface courses. The paint and tape markers can cause the road surface to crack, and in more severe cases, the markers contribute to road surface raveling (a process in which the aggregate particles are dislodged from the road surface, causing the surface texture to become deeply pitted and very rough) or potholes.

This type of surface damage can be found exclusively underneath the pavement markings such as lane markings and turn-lane arrows. There is no definitive explanation of the relationship between pavement markings and surface deterioration, but there are several hypotheses. One is that water vapor may have been trapped underneath the road surface markings, causing the de-bonding of asphalt binder from the aggregate materials. Another hypothesis is that the reflectivity of the markings may create differences in solar heating and thermal expansion strains between the areas with and without markings. Small flaws caused by differential strains may be combined into longitudinal cracks along the markings. There are certain surface treatments that can make the road surface less susceptible to this type of distresses, such as slurry seals and stone mastic asphalt.

==== Marking removal ====
There are several methods of marker removal:

- Blasting: There are many materials that can be used for blasting on the road surface to remove markers. These include water, sand, crushed glass, dry ice and soda. High-pressure water blasting method uses 30,000 psi (210 MPa) water jet system on a truck equipped with vacuum heads to blast out the markings and suction up the water and debris back to the storage area of the truck. The method can remove markers at speeds of 2 mph (3.2 km/h). The only disadvantage of this method is that it can only be operated at above the freezing temperature. Sand blasting methods utilises high-pressure air and a nozzle to blast sand aggregate. This method produces a lot of debris. It requires a vehicle to supply the aggregate sand and another vehicle with debris collection system. Sand blasting can cause the pavement surface to be polished causing surface scars and ghost marks due to the contrast between the blasting and non blasting areas. Soda and dry ice blasting are similar to sand blasting with reduced effects in surface scarring and ghost marks, but the process is slower. Hydroblasting is a combination of water and sand blasting operated at the pressures up to 10,000 psi (69 MPa). However, the method has been replaced with high-pressure water blasting.
- Grinding: The grinding method is to use rotating abrasive surface against the markings to break them up. It can be in the form of grinding, milling or flailing. One grinding head uses orbital abrasive disks similar to an orbital sander. Another grinding head uses spindles with teeth. Another type of grinding use a drum of disks with teeth stacked side by side. Surface scarring is expected with all grinding techniques.
- Burning: High heat and flame can be used as methods of marker removal. In the hot-compressed air method, a combustion chamber with a mixture of high-velocity air and propane can emit heated gas with temperatures of 2,400 °F (1,320 °C). An excess-oxygen method uses propane and oxygen mixture ejected out of a nozzle to create an external flame and additional oxygen is added to the flame to create temperatures in excess of 4,500 °F (2,480 °C). The flame is applied directly to the markers. In both methods, care is to be taken not to melt the asphalt road surface.
- Other methods: Lasers have been used in an experimental phase to remove markers, but the process is slow. A method of chemical applications to the markers to break them down is also used. This method requires pressure washing to remove the markers. In certain cases, masking the markers is preferred. Marking material is used to cover the markers or a portion of road surface. The colour of the masking material is made to resemble that of the road surface. Some markings such removable preformed tapes are applied as a temporary marker removal measure. The most expensive method is resurfacing. This method is used only in limited cases.

=== Road marking methods ===
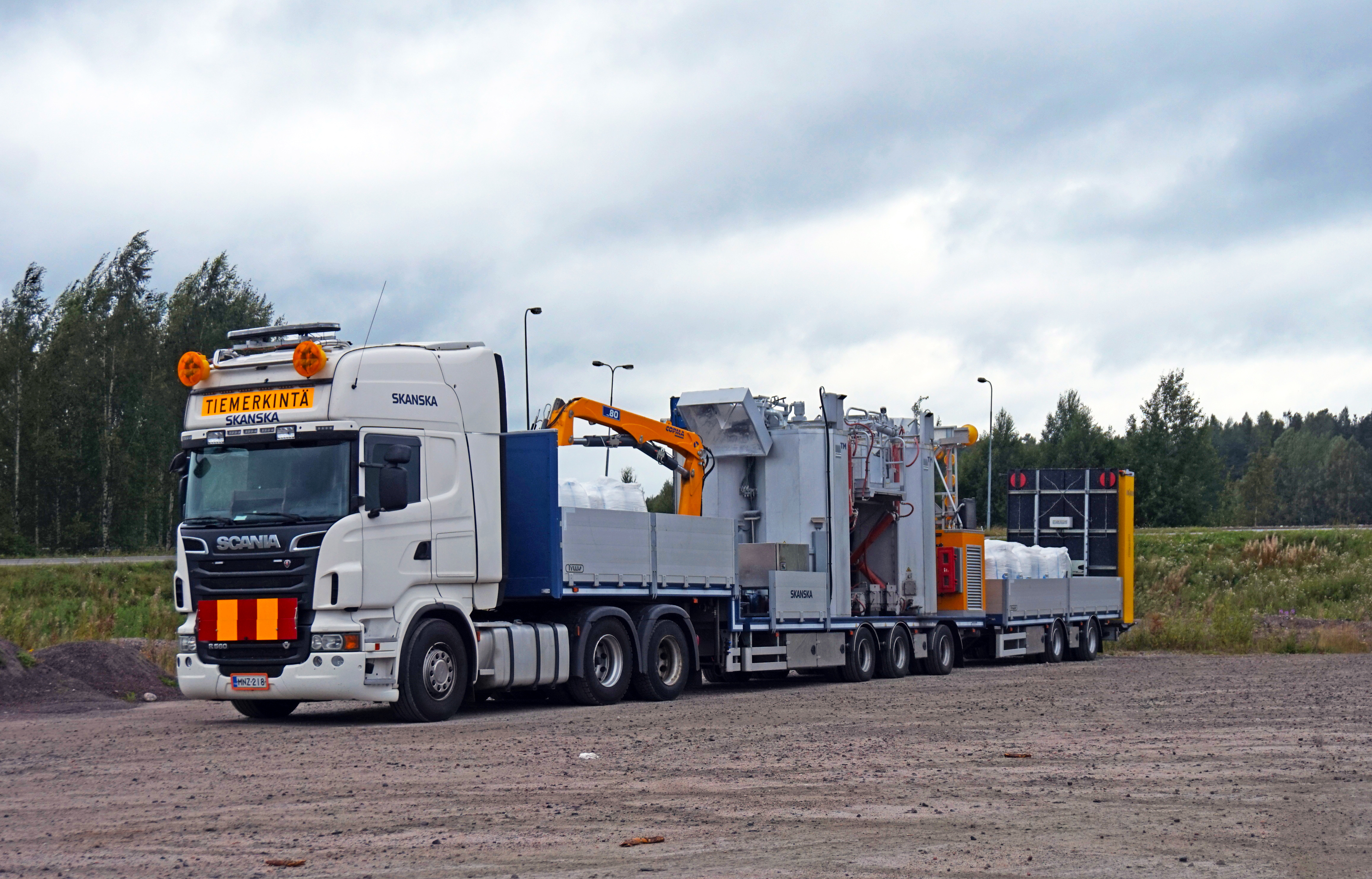
A road marking vehicle in Nastola, Finland

Thermoplastic road marking paint is a solid powder at room temperature. The thermoplastic paint is melted in a specialised machine called a thermoplastic heater-mixer, before being transferred into the paint tank of a marker. Larger marking machines may have internal heater-mixers. The molten coating is introduced into an insulated marking bucket. The marking bucket leads to a marking shoe that applies the material. Moving the shoe forward pulls a thin layer of paint onto the road. The thickness of this layer is controlled by the gap between the marking shoe and the road. A specialised attachment can spread an even layer of glass beads onto the paint as it is deposited.

==== Machine marking types ====
Air spray is a method of marking that uses compressed air to spray the paint onto the road surface. The finely atomised paint produces a thin and smooth layer, but the rebounding air flow causes significant paint scattering. This produces somewhat sloppy markings.

High-pressure airless spraying uses a high-pressure airless pump to spray the paint. The atomised paint is not so fine and smooth as air spray, but there is no high speed air flow to scatter any rebounding paint. The marked lines are neat. This method can apply paints of high viscosity, and apply relatively thick layers in a single pass.

==== Auxiliary equipment ====
Other equipment is often used with road marking machines. The main auxiliary equipment includes thermoplastic paint pre-heaters, hand-push pre-markers and road marking removers. Thermoplastic paint pre-heater is used to melt the solid powder coating into a viscous liquid, providing a steady supply of paint to the marking machine. Pre-markers are used to draw a field sketch in advance to avoid faulty marking. Road marking removers are used to remove old or incorrect markings. Large self-propelled machines usually do not need any support equipment, as equivalent functionality is built in.

=== Temporary markers ===
Traffic cones are sometimes used to separate High-occupancy vehicle lanes from regular traffic lanes. They are also used in areas where lanes are used at different times for travel in both directions. These cones have shafts that drop into holes in the road surface. A good example of this type of use was the Golden Gate Bridge in San Francisco, before they switched to a moveable barrier system.

Removable tapes can also be used in road construction sites as temporary markers. The tapes can be placed to shift the lanes and black tapes can be used to temporarily blackout the existing markings. At the end of the constructions or within 6 months, the tapes can be pulled out off the surface without using heat, solvents, or machines.

== Country specific information ==
=== The Americas ===
Almost all countries in North and South America have solid and intermittent yellow lines separating traffic directions. However, Argentina and Uruguay have intermittent white lines separating traffic when overtaking is permitted from both directions, and solid yellow lines when overtaking is prohibited from both directions; when overtaking is permitted from only one direction, such countries separate traffic with a combination of white and yellow lines. Chile usually uses white lines only, except when snowy conditions are possible (in the South and on mountain roads). Then all lines are yellow. Venezuela uses white lines.

==== Canada ====
In Canada, the Volatile Organic Compound Concentration Limits for Architectural Coatings Regulations stipulate that paints for traffic markings cannot contain more than 450 g/L of Volatile Organic Compounds. Additionally, traffic marking coatings are subject to a seasonal use restriction of 150 g/L of VOCs in effect from May 1 to October 15.

Yellow lines are used to separate traffic moving in opposite directions, and white lines are used to separate traffic moving in the same direction, and on the shoulders of paved roads. On one-directional roads, a yellow line appears on the left shoulder, and a white line on the right shoulder. Passing rules are denoted by dashed lines as in the United States. In Ontario, it is legal to cross a single solid yellow line along a straight road if the vehicle is not within 30 meters of a bridge or railway crossing.

Orange painted lines are sometimes used when the direction of the road is altered temporarily for construction projects. However, the colour scheme was reversed before 1971, when white was formerly used to denote the separation of opposing traffic, and yellow lines, when used, to denote the separation of the paved road from the right-hand shoulder.

Broken lines that are wider and closer together than regular broken lines are called continuity lines. Continuity lines on the left side of a lane denote that the lane is about to end and that motorists must soon merge left. Continuity lines on the right mean that the lane will continue, but traffic may merge into it ahead.

In some areas, reflective markers (cat's eyes) recessed into the pavement are used, especially approaching curves in the road.

A number of provinces have pavement marking test areas on major roads, to evaluate new pavement markings in relation to existing markings. In Ontario, a well-known location is the eastbound lanes of Highway 401 near Belleville. Other test sites are located on the westbound lanes on Highway 417, east of Ottawa, Highway 60 West of Renfrew, Highway 28 east of Bancroft, Highway 400 North of Honey Harbour and on Highway 37, South of Tweed. Pavement marking manufacturers from around the world supply a variety of materials for these sites to have their products evaluated and approved for use on provincial highways. Other provinces with road marking test areas include Quebec, New Brunswick, and Nova Scotia. Quebec's is outside of Montreal on Autoroute 40; in New Brunswick, the area is outside of Fredericton on Highway 2; Nova Scotia's test area is north of Halifax on Highway 102.

==== United States ====
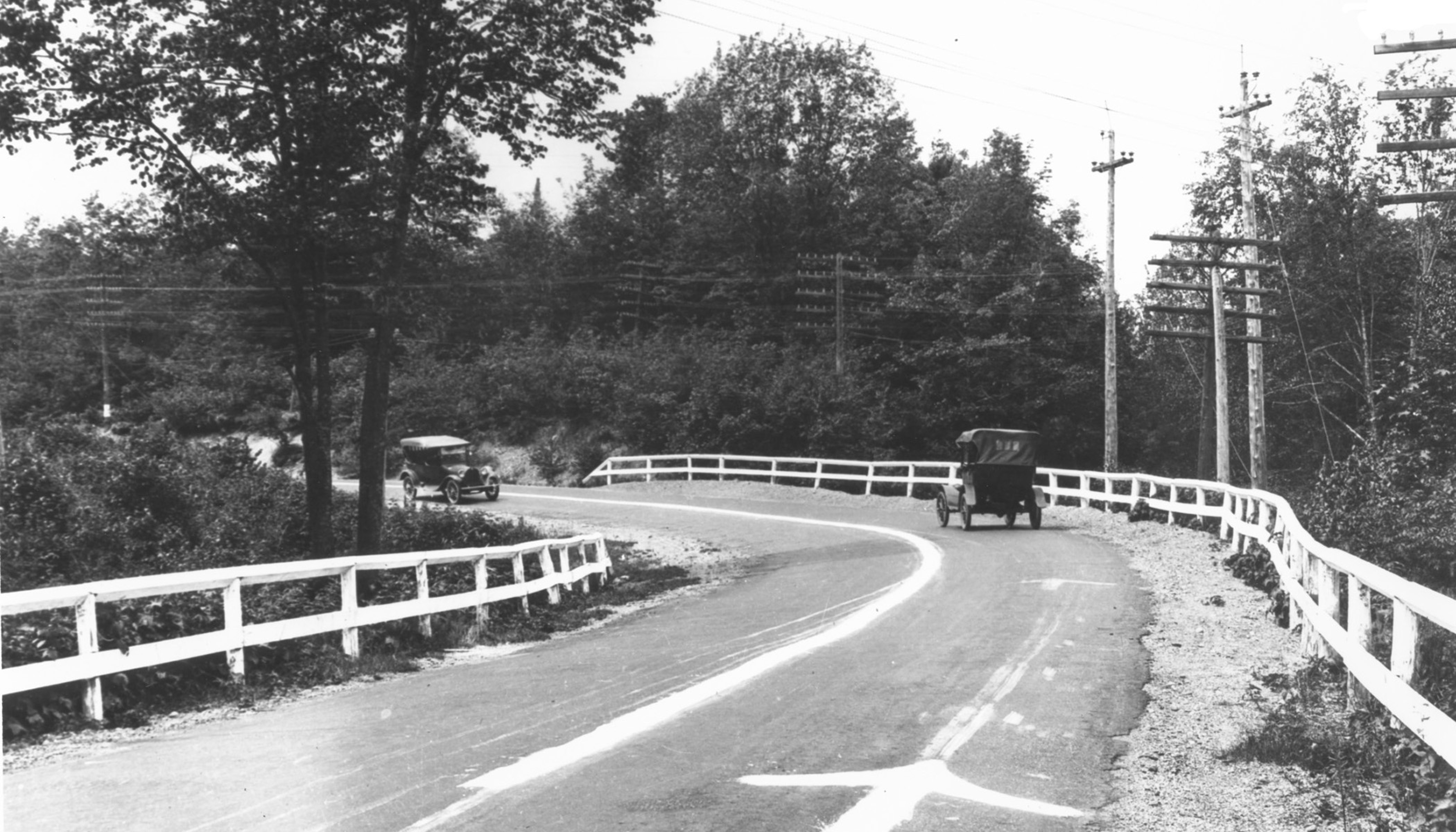
Dead Man's Curve along the Marquette–Negaunee Road in Marquette County, Michigan, shown in 1917 with its hand-painted centre line

In the United States, the first documented use of a painted centre line was in 1911 along Trenton's River Road in Wayne County, Michigan. According to the state of Michigan, the idea of using a painted centre line was conceived in 1911 by Edward N. Hines, the chairman of the Wayne County Board of Roads, after watching a leaky milk wagon leave a white trail along a road. Hines was the fifth recipient of the George S. Bartlett Award for Highway Progress, and was inducted posthumously in 1972 into the Michigan Transportation Hall of Honor for his innovation, and was honoured in 2011 with the first Paul Mijksenaar Design for Function Award.

In 1917, the idea of using painted centre lines on rural state highways was conceived and/or put into action in at least three states (Michigan, Oregon, and California), apparently completely independent of one another. At some point in 1917, a white highway centre line was painted along "Dead Man's Curve" on what is now County Road 492 in Marquette County, Michigan, under the direction of Kenneth Ingalls Sawyer, who served as engineer-superintendent of the Marquette County Road Commission. Sawyer was inducted posthumously into the Michigan Transportation Hall of Honor in 1973.

In Oregon in April 1917, a yellow centre line was painted on the Columbia River Highway, between Crown Point and Multnomah Falls, at the direction of Multnomah County Sheriff's Deputy Peter Rexford. Later in 1917, the same line was continued west of Crown Point. Rexford first conceived the idea of a yellow centre line in early 1917 while riding on a bus from Salem, Oregon on a dark and rainy night, and advocated it as a safety measure on the Columbia River Highway, which Rexford patrolled as a traffic officer. When Multnomah County declined to fund the project, Rexford's boss, Chief Deputy Martin T. Pratt (later elected Sheriff), paid for the paint out of his own pocket so that the centre line could be painted. Rexford later described the April 1917 line as the "first yellow center line ever painted on pavement" in the United States. An article published in The Oregonian upon Rexford's retirement claimed that a contest with a $10,000 reward was once held to determine the originator of the highway centre line, but the contest was scrapped when information from Europe revealed that ancient civilisations had used white bricks to mark the centre lines of their streets.

In the fall of 1917, June McCarroll of Indio, California developed the idea of white centre lines and began advocating for their use, after she was run off the road by a truck while driving along a highway that would later be incorporated into US 99. McCarroll soon communicated her idea to the local chamber of commerce and the Riverside County Board of Supervisors, with no success. She then took it upon herself to hand-paint a white stripe down the middle of the road, thus establishing the actual width of the lane to prevent similar accidents. In 2002, a portion of Interstate 10 was designated and signed as "The Doctor June McCarroll Memorial Freeway" in her honour.

The question of which colour to use for highway centre lines (dividing opposing traffic) in the United States was the subject of considerable debate and changing standards over a period of several decades. It was the single most controversial and most heavily debated issue resolved by the promulgation of the 1948 edition of the Manual on Uniform Traffic Control Devices (MUTCD), which mandated white as the standard colour of centre lines nationwide. The only exceptions to this standard were for double centre lines on multi-lane highways and for centre lines in no-passing zones, where yellow was recommended but not mandatory. By November 1954, 47 of the 48 states had adopted white as their standard colour for highway centre lines, with Oregon being the last holdout to use yellow. In 1958, the U.S. Bureau of Public Roads adopted white as the standard colour for the new interstate highway system.

The 1961 edition of the MUTCD mandated the use of yellow for the two specific exceptions where yellow had been previously recommended but not required, and concurrently banned white in those contexts. The drafters of the 1961 MUTCD gave three reasons for the change: "(1) It contrasts with the normal white centre or lane lines and thus gives emphasis to the hazard; (2) Yellow has been accepted as a symbolic warning colour in signs and signals; and (3) It is consistent with the standard for no-passing-zone markings approved by the American Association of State Highway Officials and is in use in more than two-thirds of the States for barrier lines."

The 1971 edition of the MUTCD mandated yellow as the standard colour of all centre lines on all roads and highways in all contexts, and banned the use of white. The point was to establish a consistent colour code in pavement markings: from now on, yellow would always delineate opposing traffic flows and white would always delineate traffic flowing in the same direction. The changeover to the 1971 MUTCD standards took place between 1971 and 1975, with most repainting completed by the end of 1973, so for two years drivers still had to use the old and new. One odd exception was that white was still allowed as the left edge line colour on the leftmost lane (closest to the median) on divided highways. The 1973 supplement of the MUTCD fixed this by mandating yellow for left edge lines on divided highways.

The major downside to the MUTCD white-yellow system is that yellow has slightly less contrast than white, especially at night, so for maximum contrast, bright yellow—and highly toxic—lead chromate was used to paint yellow lines through the end of the 20th century. As a result, U.S. transportation workers must take special precautions when disturbing or removing yellow lane markings.

In 2002, the Texas A&M Transportation Institute researched the viability of converting from yellow to white centre lines for the Transportation Research Board. The researchers conducted a survey and discovered that 75% of American drivers associate dashed yellow centre lines with dividing opposing traffic; this number rises to 85% for solid centre lines. These findings implied that any conversion to white would require an enormously expensive driver education program on top of the cost of repainting centre lines, and therefore the Texas researchers advised against conversion.

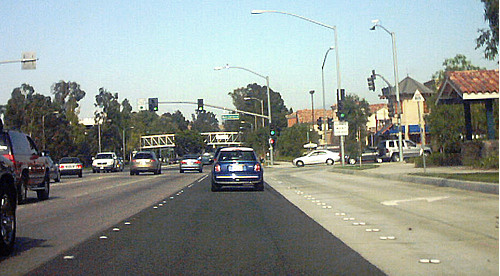
A typical stretch of Valencia Boulevard in Valencia, California, where the lanes are marked only by Botts' dots

In the U.S., the type, placement, and graphic standards of traffic signs, and road surfaces are legally regulated—the Federal Highway Administration's Manual on Uniform Traffic Control Devices is the standard, although each state produces its own manual based upon the Federal manual.

In some areas, such as Colorado and Florida, black material is applied on the surface before a shorter white line is painted. This improves the contrast of the marking against "white" pavements, such as concrete or faded asphalt.

In California, Botts' dots were commonly used to mark lanes on most freeways from the mid-1960s to the mid-2010s (when the state began to transition away from them and back to using painted lines to divide lanes). Many California cities also use Botts' dots on some (or all) major arterial roads. The notable exception is the city of Los Angeles which only uses paint.

In California and Nevada, Botts' dots when present are usually the lines, and no paint is used for additional markings. Exceptions include: freeways built from white concrete where painted stripes are added to make the lanes more visible through sun glare, freeways built so wide that the risk of drifting out of lane is minimal (e.g., Interstate 5 in the Central Valley), and freeways in areas where it snows in the winter (since the snowploughs would scrape off the Botts' dots).

In general, white lines separate traffic in the same direction, single broken lines mean passing or lane changing is allowed, single solid white lines mean lane changing is discouraged or prohibited, and double solid white lines mean it is prohibited, as it often is in tunnels. On two-lane roads, a single broken centre line means that passing is allowed in either direction, a double solid centre line means passing is prohibited in both directions, and the combination of a solid line with a broken line means that passing is allowed only from the side with the broken line and prohibited from the side with the solid line. Lanes with double broken yellow lines on each side are reversible, and lane control signals are used to indicate which direction traffic in such lanes is supposed to travel. The solid white line on the right side is called the 'fog line' used to help cars stay in their lane during foggy conditions and help pedestrians stay off the road.

Marked crosswalks are indicated at a minimum by a pair of white lines. On major boulevards, crosswalks are further highlighted by zebra stripes, which are large white rectangles in the crosswalk perpendicular to traffic. In order to maximise the longevity of zebra crossing stripes, they are usually applied to correspond with the portions of the lane on which the wheels of a car are not usually traveling, thereby reducing wear on the markings themselves.

Pavement markings are used in addition to signs in the United States to designate regular and handicap parking spaces. Regular parking spaces are normally marked with white, although other colours are used. Handicap parking spaces are required to be located within a specified distance of an entrance. Blue markings are used to indicate the parking space is reserved for persons with a disabled parking permit.

Text is painted onto the pavement to reinforce roadside signs that may be obscured for various reasons or that drivers may overlook. Common examples of such legends include "STOP" (before a solid stop line and beside a stop sign) and "SCHOOL" (at the beginning of a school zone). On many California streets, the speed limit is painted onto the road surface to alert drivers to a reduced speed zone. At some complex junctions, route shield pavement markings guide drivers into the correct lane in advance of an overhead guide sign.

Pavement marking test areas exist throughout the United States on various major roads. Interstate 95 in Florida has two test locations in Brevard County: northbound lanes, between mile markers 194 to 198, where the roadway is concrete; and southbound lanes between mile markers 162 to 163, where the roadway is asphalt. Interstate 4 had two testing locations in Polk County between mile markers 27 to 29 in both east- and westbound lanes.

=== Asia ===
==== Hong Kong ====
Road markings in Hong Kong are basically identical with the United Kingdom, with longer dashed white lines to indicate lanes of opposing traffic or hazards, and shorter dashed white lines for lanes in the same direction. Solid double white lines indicate that drivers and cyclists must not drive or cycle on them. A solid white line with a broken white line indicates that crossing the line is allowed from the lane closer to the broken line. Double solid white lines are in place in all tunnels and underpasses.

Solid yellow lines are painted along the kerbside to indicate that stopping is not allowed, unlike in the UK where they only prohibit parking. Double solid yellow lines mean stopping is not allowed at any time (parking itself is prohibited on any street with street lighting regardless of whether there are single or double yellow lines). Zig-zag lines are used on both ends of zebra crossings to indicate that drivers and cyclists must not stop unless giving way to pedestrians, and pedestrians must not cross the road otherwise than on the crossing. Road studs are also used as in the UK.

==== Indonesia ====
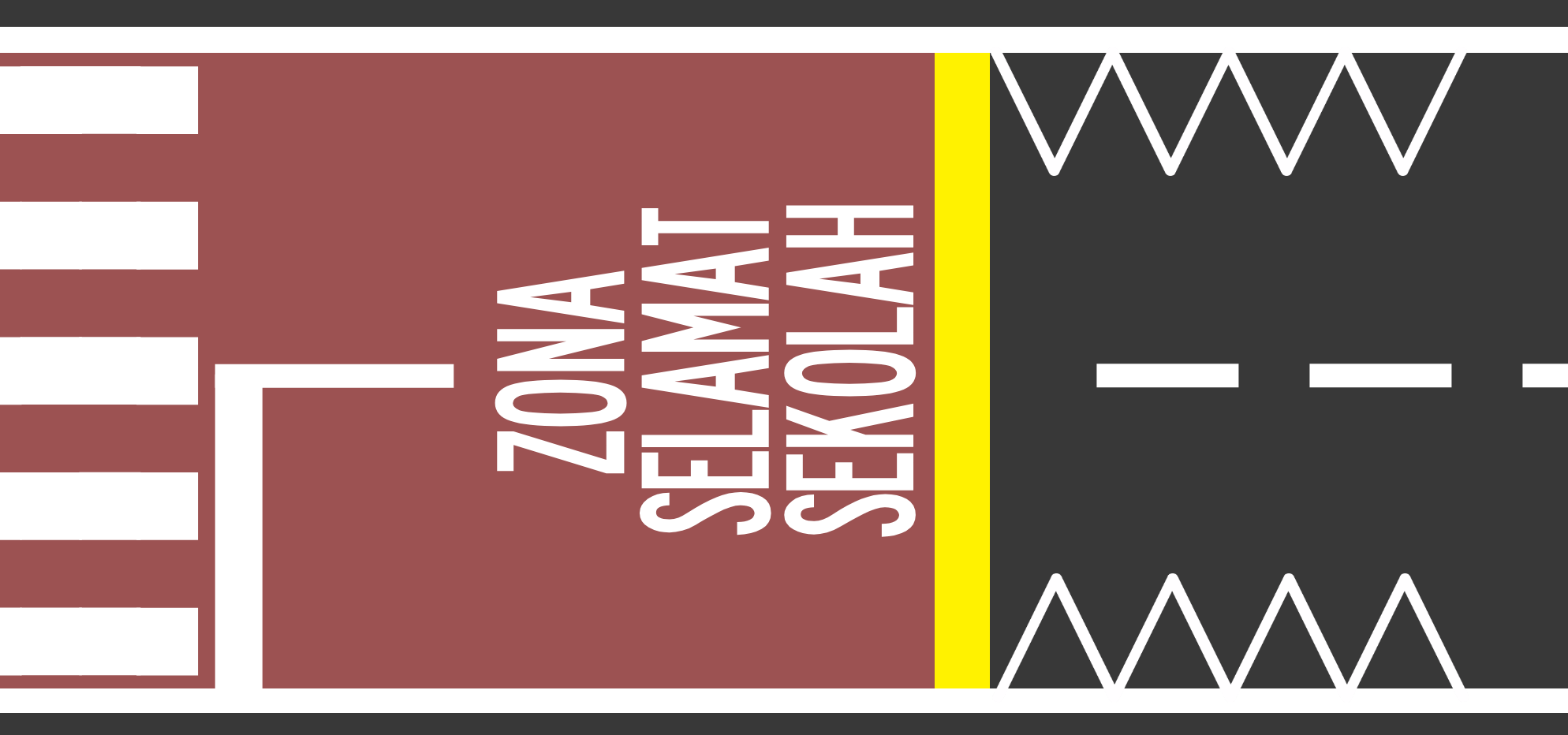
School zone

Road markings in Indonesia are almost similar to markings in Europe and especially in the Netherlands.

Markings are divided into four types, they are:

- Line marking, marks that are parallel to the axis of the road.
- Cross marking, mark that is crosswise to the axis of the road, such as at a stop line at a Zebra cross or at an intersection
- Chevron, sign that forms a complete line which is not included in the meaning of line marking or cross marking, to indicate an area of the road surface that is not a vehicle traffic lane.
- Symbol marking, mark that contain certain meanings to express warnings, orders and prohibitions to complement or confirm the intent conveyed by traffic signs or other traffic signs.

The colours also represent the use:

- White for lines
- Yellow for lines (national roads)
- Red for busways and school zones
- Green for bicycle lanes

==== Israel ====
In Israel, white lines are used to separate both traffic driving in the same direction and in opposite directions, while yellow lines are used to mark the shoulder of the road.

==== Japan ====
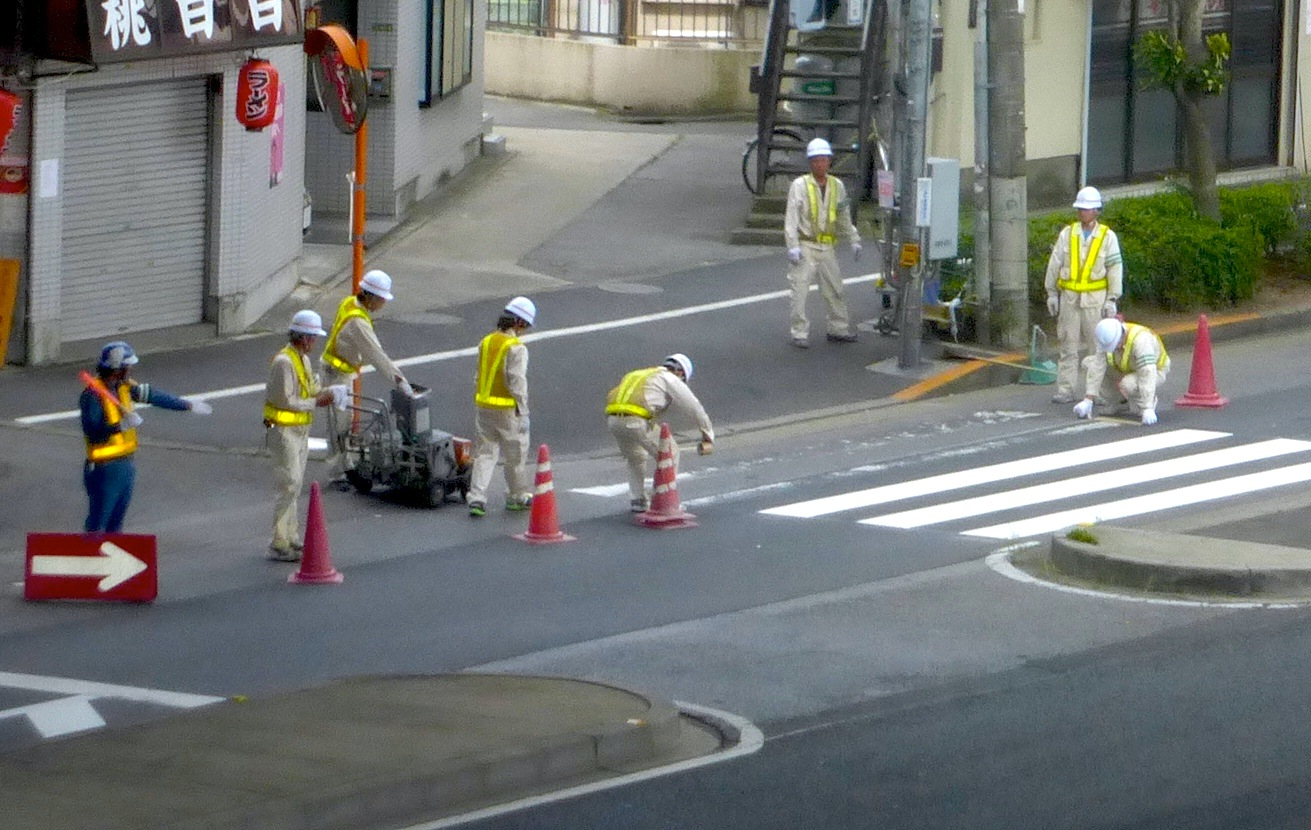
Workers applying crosswalk road surface markings in the Tokyo area

In Japan, white always separates traffic in the same direction or indicates traffic in the same direction can use a buffered area that is striped in crosshatch patterns such as at right turns on two-way roads since Japan is a country that has left-side driving.

White is also used on divided expressways with a solid raised centre divider. Two-lane expressways where poles are the only physical barrier between opposing directions of travel always have yellow either side of the row of poles, and white is between the yellow striping and the poles.

White is also used to denote passing allowed on other two-lane roads. Yellow indicates no passing is allowed. On all roads, yellow stripes are always solid.

On expressways where there are many sharp turns and curves, seen especially in the largest cities, a yellow line indicates no passing between lanes, as follows:

- Solid yellow beside solid white: no entry permitted from the lane the stripe is next to, but passing is permitted with caution.
- Solid yellow beside broken white: passing is permitted from the side with the broken white line, but not from the side with the yellow line.
- Solid yellow line alone: passing prohibited from either lane, used on very tight curves and in tunnels.

Other markings include in the cities, destination and exit names painted in the lanes, which is done due to the very close proximity of exits, where in many cases it would be impractical to put up many overhead signs, although these are often seen approaching exits, a curved or slanted arrow points to the side of the expressway the exit will be on. A straight arrow following characters indicates the destination of the expressway.

Where a solid white line appears between lanes, passing is generally allowed but with caution.

==== North Korea ====
Road markings in the Democratic People's Republic of Korea are rare, but if they do exist, the lines are usually painted white, as in the highway from Pyongyang to Nampo.

==== South Korea ====
In the Republic of Korea, white always separates traffic in the same direction. White solid line means "do not change lanes", and a white double solid line has the meaning of further emphasis on that way. Dash lines allow changing lanes. Zigzag lanes mean deceleration.

The yellow line is the centre line, which separates traffic in the opposite direction. Yellow solid line means "do not cross the center line, and temporary crossing of the center line for overtaking purposes is also not permitted", and yellow double solid line has the meaning of further emphasis on that way. Yellow dash lines meaning "temporary crossing the center line (=temporary wrong-way driving) for overtaking purposes is permitted". Some intersections have white broken lines at the centre. This indicates a U-turn area; drivers can make U-turns only at this place and not make a U-turn over the yellow line. Additionally, in South Korea, turning left across the centre line is prohibited, regardless of whether it be solid or dashed.

Yellow dash centre line is also exist in South Korean law, but in reality, it is extremely rare to find a road section that is marked with a dash centre line in South Korea. Centre lines of single carriageway with 2 lanes in rural areas of South Korea is almost marking with a solid line even in sections where it is straight or where visibility is sufficient to allow temporary crossing of the centre line (=temporary wrong-way driving) for overtaking. Conversely, dash centre lines are rare than solid centre lines. As a result, inconveniences are occurring all over South Korea, with drivers having to illegally cross the centre line to overtake slow-speed vehicles, like agricultural vehicles such as cultivators and tractors, because they cannot legally overtake them in that road section.

Tunnel sections of South Korean roads are almost prohibited from passing, and are marked with white solid lines that mean "do not change lane". This creates the inconvenience of not being able to legally change lanes within tunnels. Furthermore, there is criticism that white solid lines in tunnels pose a high risk of accidents than white dash lines.

A blue line means bus (or tram) only.

- Single line: bus-only lane at a rush hour such as 7:00–9:00 and 17:30–19:30 on weekdays
- Double line: bus-only lane at additional times such as 5:00–11:0015:00–22:00 on weekdays or double line on several streets means bus-only lane all day, including weekends.
- Dash line: bus-only lane. Other cars can temporarily use bus lanes to turn right into alleys or join regular lanes. Taxis can also temporarily pass through bus-only lanes to allow passengers to get on and off.
- Solid line: bus-only lane. Other cars are never allowed to enter the bus-only lane.

A line drawn along the side of the road:

- White line: parking and stopping is allowed, but it isn't allowed on motorways and expressways.
- Yellow dash line: stopping is allowed, but no parking. However, some local governments allow parking at particular times. The time available for parking is written on a sign.
- Yellow single solid line: no parking and no stopping, however some local governments allow parking or stopping at particular times. The time available for parking or stopping is written on a sign.
- Yellow double solid line: no parking and stopping all day. These are used near an intersection, the crosswalk, or a bus station.
- Red double solid line: no parking or stopping all day because there is a fire hydrant.
- Zigzag lanes mean deceleration.

==== Philippines ====
Standard road markings in the Philippines are defined by the Department of Public Works and Highways. Most road markings use white, with yellow lines used on no-overtaking lines and box junction markings. Painted turn arrows at intersections generally follow the same design used in many European countries.

=== Europe ===
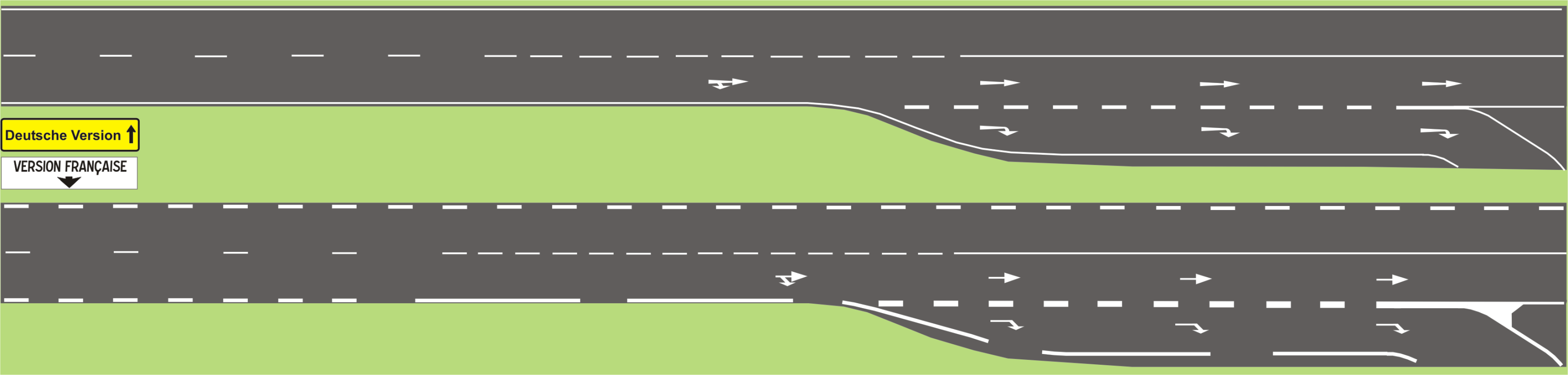
In Europe every country has its own standards.
Top - German-style
Bottom - French-style

In general European countries follow the Vienna Convention on Road Signs and Signals, which describes what road signs and road markings shall look like. The convention has some flexibility so road markings vary somewhat between the countries.

Most European countries reserve white for routine lane markings of any kind. Yellow is used to mark forbidden parking, such as on bus stops. In most European countries, white is used to separate traffic directions, but this is not the case in Norway and Finland: Norway instead has yellow markings separating traffic directions , and Finland uses yellow lines for no passing and white when passing is allowed. Many countries use yellow, orange, or red to indicate when lanes are being shifted temporarily to make room for construction projects. In Croatia, in addition to serving as temporary signage, yellow lines are used permanently to distinguish lanes and turn directions dedicated to public transport.

In France, Switzerland, and Mexico on highways the outside lines are interrupted at a regular distance which allows drivers and police to check distance between moving vehicles.

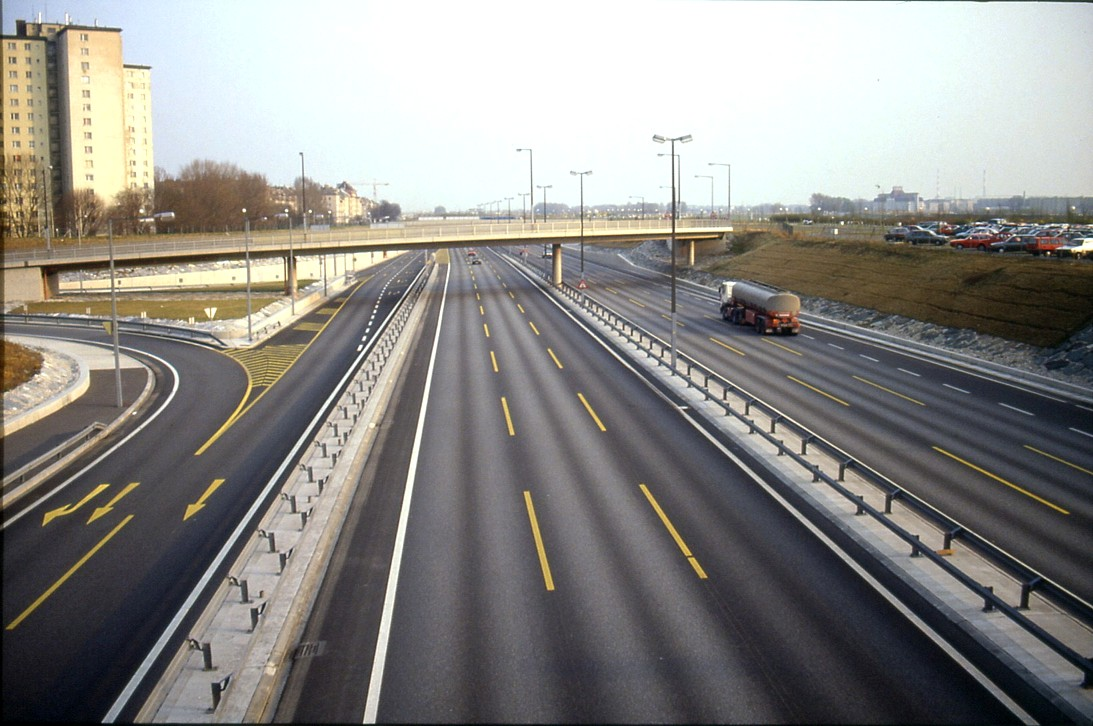
Yellow road markings separating lanes in Austria, 1990. They were replaced with regular white road markings starting from 1995

In the Netherlands, Germany, Sweden, and the UK, so-called "naked roads" have been trialed, whereby all visible road markings, kerbs, traffic lights, and signs are removed, on urban roads. When this was tested in Seend, a village in the UK county of Wiltshire in 2005, the county council reported that accidents fell by a third, with motorists' speed falling by an average of 5%. It has been suggested that naked roads force drivers to make eye contact with other road users, and that it is this nonverbal communication that is responsible for the reduction of accidents. Others have suggested that road markings, especially with middle marker, make the road look like a main road, triggering faster and more relaxed driving, while no marking makes the road look like a lower quality road. It is an experience from the introduction of marking, that at least on narrow roads and in curves, middle lines help make drivers stay on their side when meeting, and therefore reducing meeting accidents. Note that the 2005 experiment was on urban roads. In Sweden, local streets generally have no marking.

==== Ireland ====
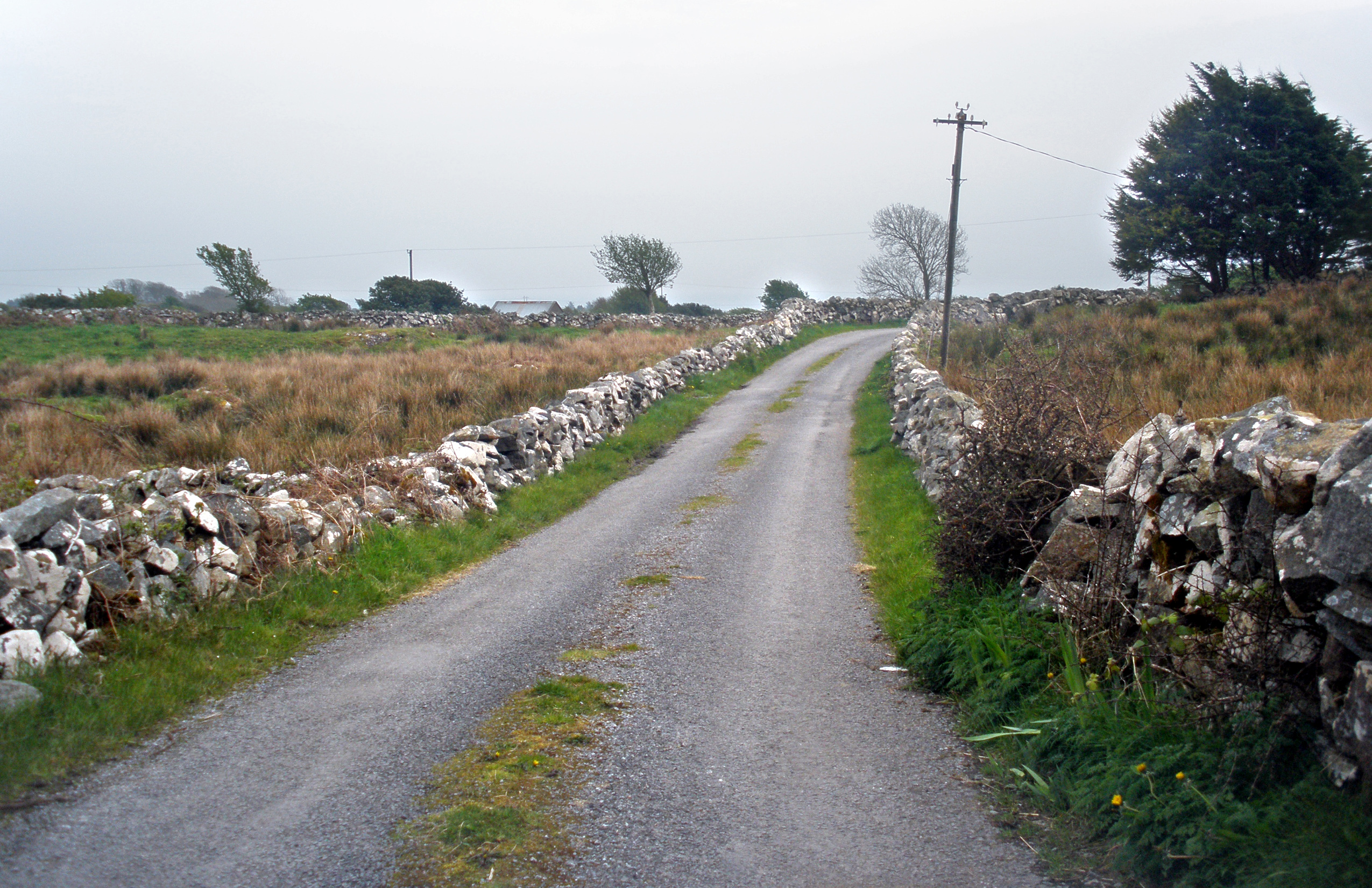
Paved bóithrín in Baile Éamon, Spiddal, County Galway

In Ireland, the centre-line is usually white while the shoulder line is usually yellow. Many rural roads are too narrow to fit a centre-line and only have a shoulder, but sometimes have no road markings. When a rural road has no markings, and grass is growing in the middle it is known as a bóithrín (or English: Bohereen or Boreen). In urban areas, the shoulder is not usually indicated. Double solid yellow lines indicate areas in which parking is forbidden. On most traffic light junctions, in order to improve traffic flow, a hatched yellow box is used. A vehicle cannot enter the box unless it can exit without stopping.

The white centre-line can be either broken or solid. Both single solid lines and double solid white lines forbid overtaking, while dashed white lines and double dashed white lines allow vehicles to overtake each other.

On motorways, same-direction dashed lines are coloured in white as is standard in much of the world. The motorway shoulder is a yellow solid line. On dual carriageways (N or R roads with two or more lanes in each direction), the shoulder is indicated by a yellow dashed line which is standard.

==== Netherlands ====
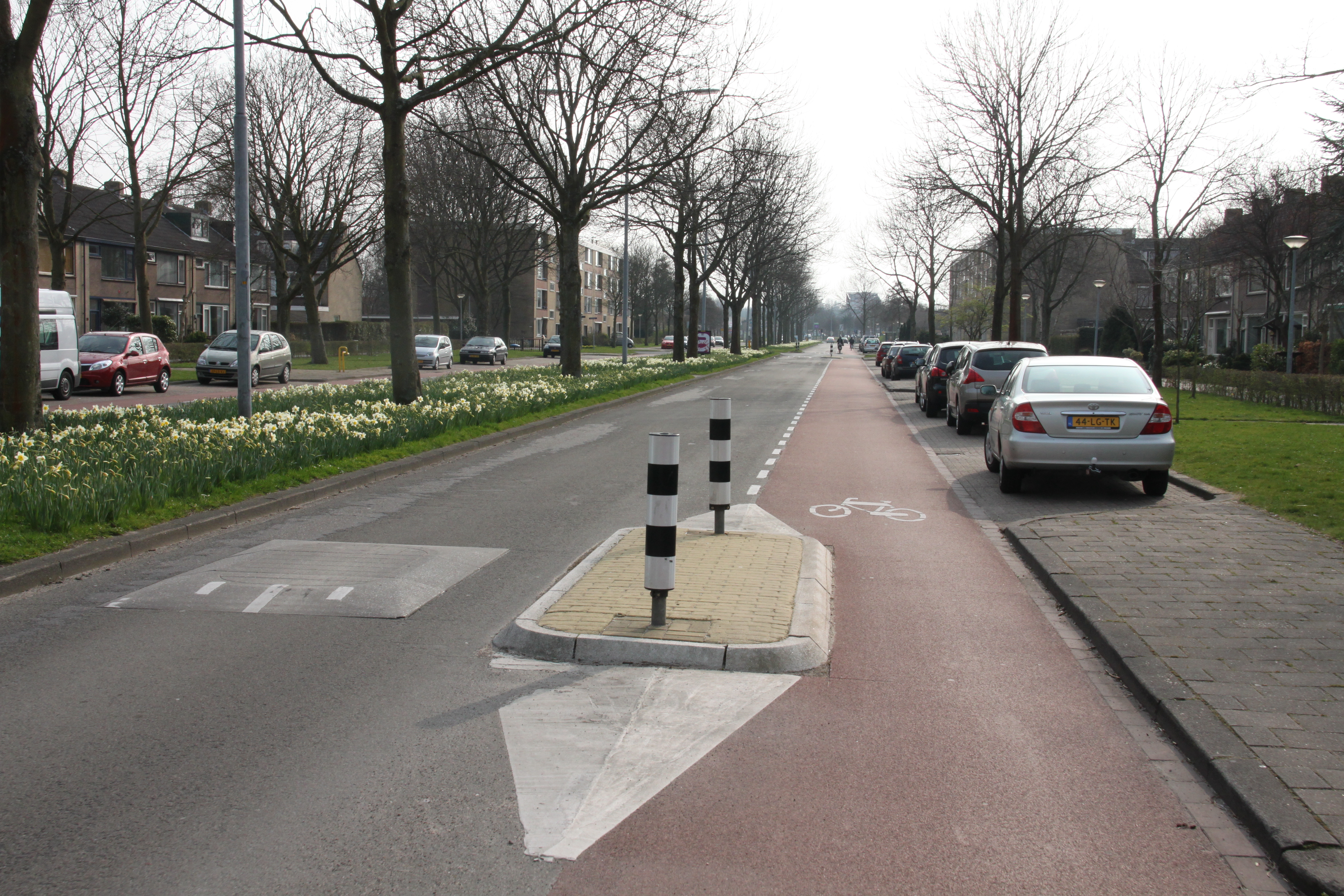
Bicycle lane markings adjacent to a traffic lane in the Netherlands

In the Netherlands all general lines are white, while yellow lines are used to mark forbidden stopping (solid yellow), forbidden parking (broken yellow) and for temporarily lining at construction projects.

Shoulder lines are generally interrupted outside built-up area to make the driver be aware the presence of crossing bicycles and pedestrians, driveways and stopping cars. Wider roads sometimes have a single, but in most cases have a double centre line. Interrupted centre lines mean overtaking is allowed, a solid line means overtaking is not allowed, depending on which side of a double line is solid. Smaller roads and roads where bicycles are allowed generally do not have centre lines, and many country roads have no lines at all. Sometimes there is a centre line only in sharp curves.

Shoulder lines on expressways and motorways are solid to imply the general absence of crossing traffic and residential driveways, as well as the disallowance of leaving the road on places other than specified exits. Expressways always have double centre lines. Exit and acceleration lanes are separated by 'block marking'.

Furthermore, several traffic signs are painted on the road, such as speed limits and warning signs.

==== Norway ====
In Norway, yellow lines are used to separate traffic moving in opposite directions and on the left shoulders of paved roads, and white lines are used to separate traffic moving in the same direction, and on the right shoulders of paved roads. On roads narrower than 6 m (20 ft), the centre line is removed, and the shoulder lines are broken. Short, broken lines means passing is allowed, long, broken lines means passing is allowed but dangerous, and a double yellow line means passing is forbidden. Roads with speed limits below 60 km/h (37 mph) that indicate that passing is allowed but dangerous have a very short yellow line instead of a long one. On motorways, the left shoulder is a yellow line, like in the US. Most other European countries use white lines for all these types of lines.

==== United Kingdom ====
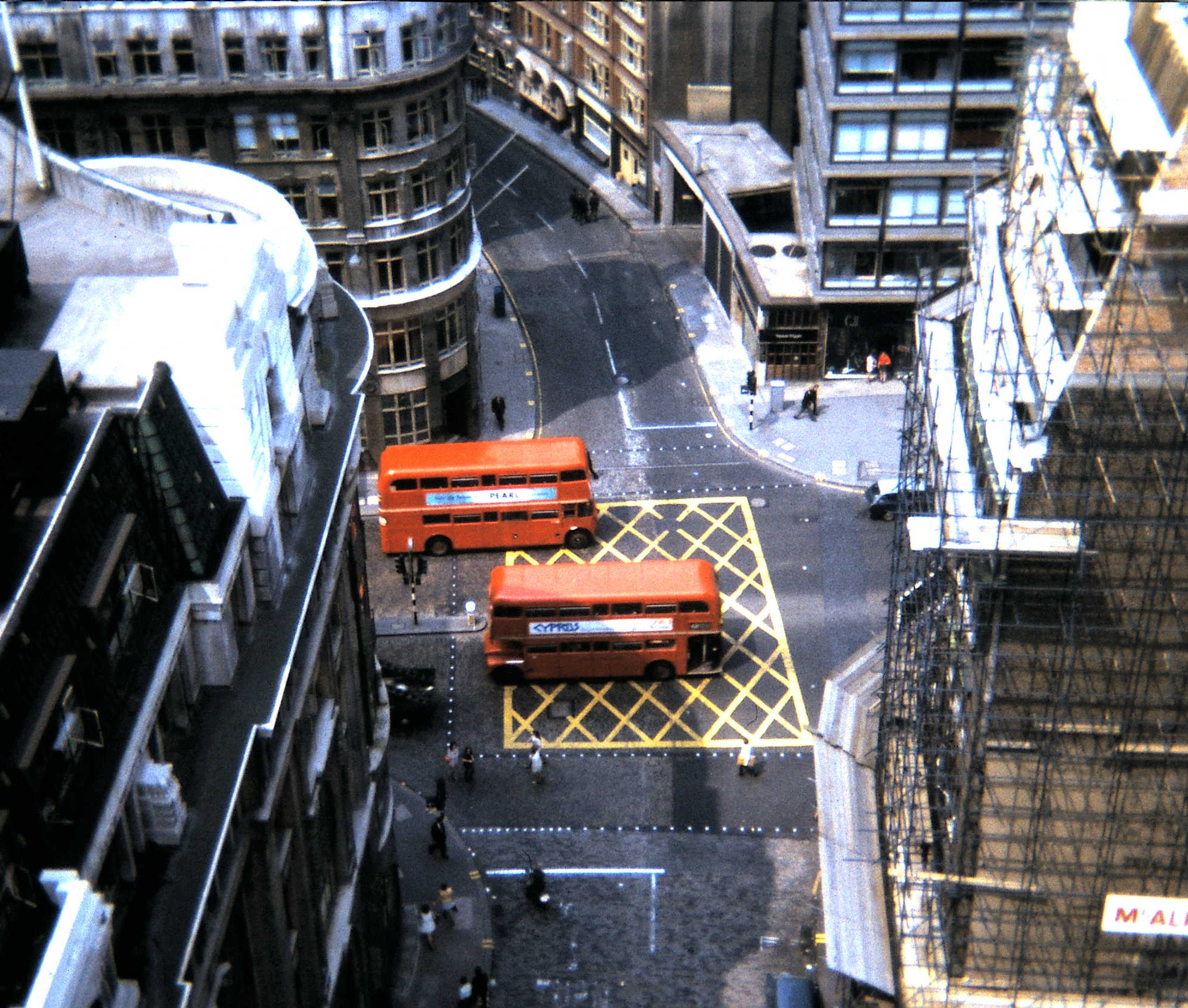
A box junction in London, pictured from atop the Monument in 1969

In the UK, the first "white line" road markings appeared on a number of dangerous bends on the London-Folkestone road at Ashford, Kent, in 1914.

In England, the idea of painting a centre white line was first experimented with in 1921 in Sutton Coldfield, Birmingham. Following complaints by residents over reckless driving and several collisions, the Sutton Coldfield Corporation decided to paint the line on Maney Corner in the area of Maney.

In 1971, a correspondent for the Sutton Coldfield News wrote an article in the newspaper recalling the event.

The line was put down as an experiment as there were a lot of accidents there, even in the early days of the motor car. The experiment proved to be so successful that the whole country adopted it as a standard road safety device, and later foreign countries paint lines on their roads, as well.

During World War II the Pedestrians Association lobbied for the government to make it safer for pedestrians to walk during the black out. As a result, white lines were painted on the sides of the road and pedestrians were allowed to use a small torch.

Following the successful "white line" experiment at Ashford, Kent in 1914, the use of painted lines on UK roads grew dramatically during the 1920s. In 1926 official guidelines were issued by the Ministry of Transport that defined where and how white lines on roads should be used. A broken white line in the direction of travel, where the gaps are longer than the painted lines, indicates the centre of the road and that there are no hazards specific to the design and layout of the road, i.e. no turnings, sharp bends ahead etc. A broken white line in which the gaps are shorter than the painted lines indicates an upcoming hazard.

The Ministry of Transport experimented with double-line road markings for the first time on sections of the A20 and A3 during Easter in 1957. The markings were cautionary, and had no legal status at that time, but motorists were advised that ignoring them could weigh heavily against someone involved in an accident in their vicinity. Further, "it is in order, if safe to do so, to cross the lines only when the broken one is on your side. It is not in order to cross when the solid line is on your side or to park there." Despite the instruction about parking, it was observed that nine bus stops were located inside prohibited parking areas.

A double solid white line indicates that the line may not be crossed, overtaking is permitted if it can be performed safely without crossing the line. Solid lines can be crossed in certain specific conditions (entering premises, overtaking a stationary vehicle, overtaking a vehicle, pedal cycle or horse travelling at less than 10 mph, or when directed to do so by a police officer). A solid white line with a broken white line parallel to it indicates that crossing the line is allowed for traffic in one direction (the side closest to the broken line) and not the other.

Solid white lines are also used to mark the outer edges of a road.

A double yellow line (commonly known as just a "Double Yellow") next to the kerb means that no parking is allowed at any time, whilst a single yellow line is used in conjunction with signs to denote that parking is restricted at certain times. Double and single red lines mean that stopping is not allowed at any time or between certain times respectively.

On many roads in the UK, retro-reflective road studs, including those known as "cat's eyes" when referring to the Halifax type road stud, are placed in the road. These devices reflect the light from a car's headlights back towards the driver in order to highlight features of the road in poor visibility or at night. The colour of road studs differs according to their location. Those defining the division between lanes are white, red road studs are placed along the hard shoulder of motorways, dual carriageways and other roads to mark the left-hand edge of a running lane; and orange road studs are placed along the edge of the central reservation. Green road studs denote slip roads at grade-separated junctions and also road-side lay-bys.

Comprehensive information about highway markings in the UK can be found in the Highway Code and on the gov.uk website.

==== Russia ====
In Russia, yellow lines may be used instead of white lines to separate oncoming traffic flows. They were authorised only in 2018 and were first painted on a short stretch of Federal Highway A138 in Murmansk Oblast. Broken yellow lines at the edge of the road mean that you cannot park, but can stop for up to 5 minutes, or more if that is needed to load and unload people or cargo. A solid yellow line on the edge of the road denotes that stopping is prohibited.

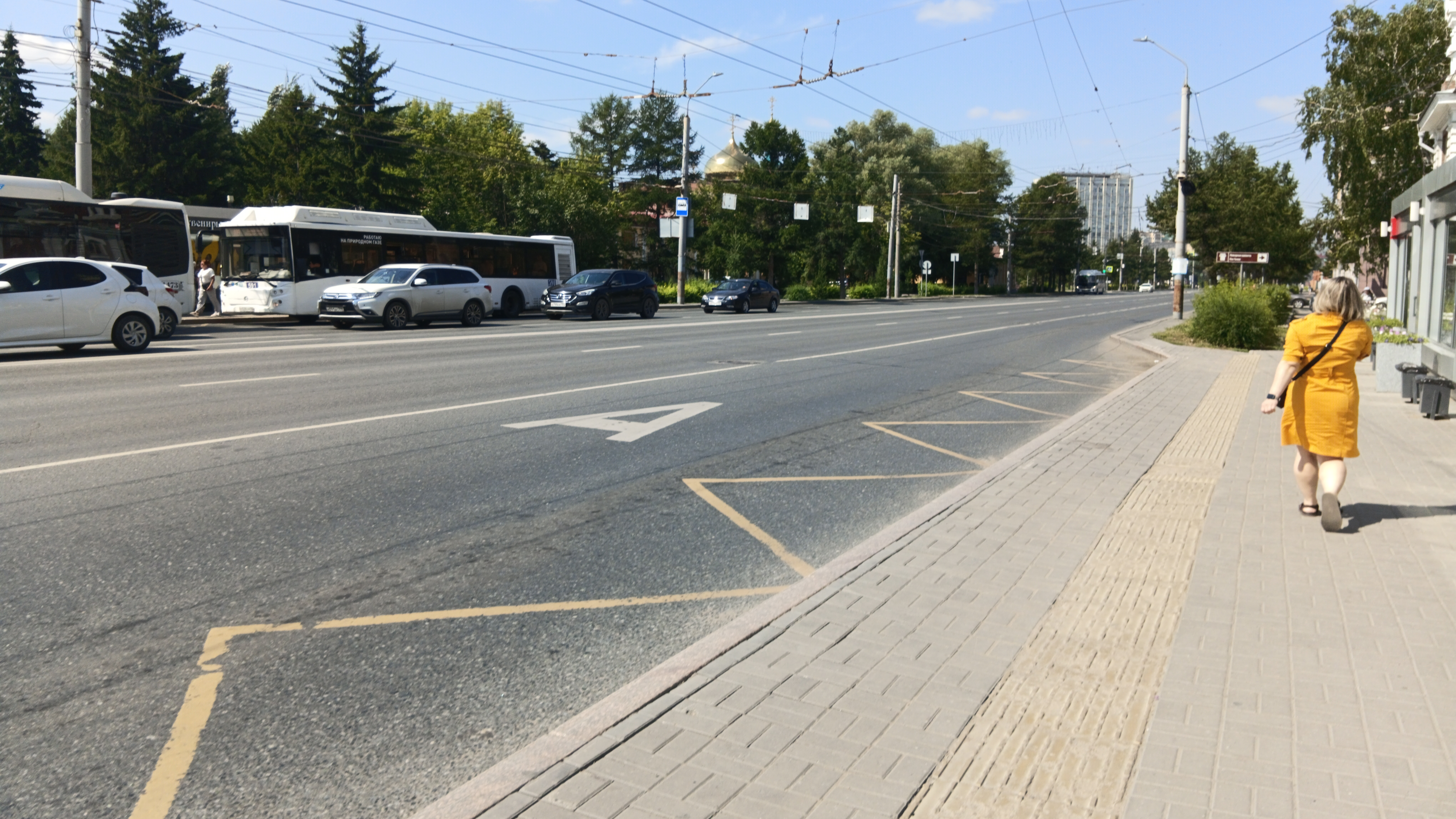
Road markings in Omsk, Russia

During road works, temporary orange lines are often provided. These have priority over permanent markings.

=== Oceania ===
==== Australia ====
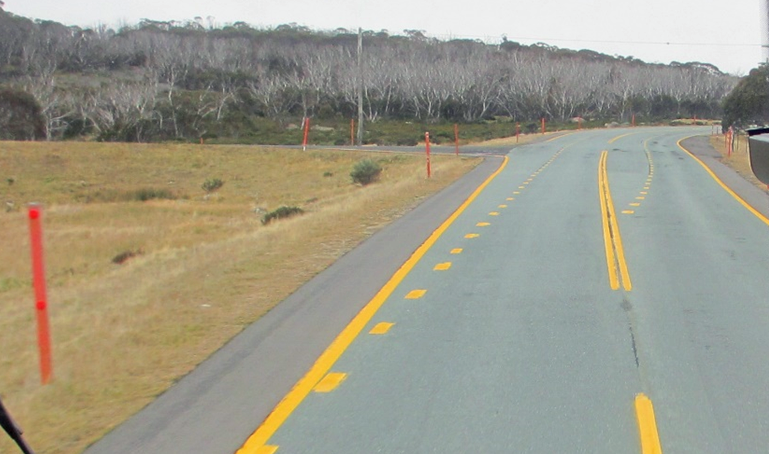
In areas with high levels of snow, such as Snowy Mountains NSW (where this picture was taken), yellow lines are used to contrast the white snow. The markers on the side of the road are also taller than other markers in NSW and pink, in order to increase visibility in snowy weather.

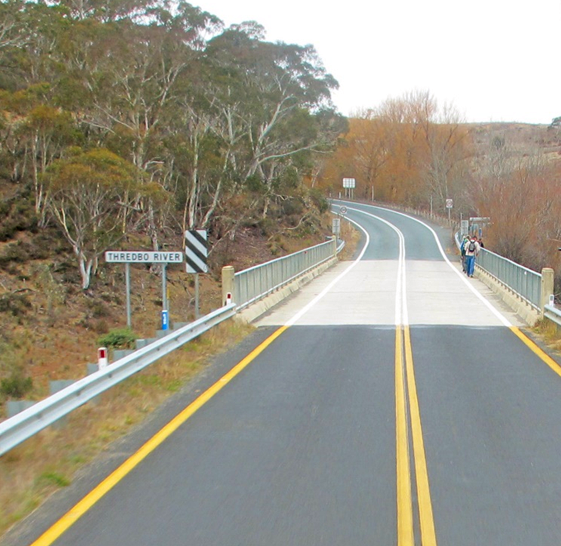
The bridge over the Thredbo River, one of the points in which the white lines become yellow as the number of snowfall increases

In Australia, road markings are typically in line with Germany and Switzerland. White lines are generally used both to separate traffic flowing in the same direction and traffic flowing in opposite directions. Double solid white centre lines may not be crossed under any circumstances unless avoiding an obstruction except in New South Wales and Western Australia where double lines may be crossed to enter or leave the roadway. Dashed lines may be crossed for overtaking, changing lanes or turning, and also in the case of double-line markings provided the dashed line is on your side of the markings. For this reason, dashed lines are usually used to mark multiple lanes travelling in one direction. Single yellow lines along road edges are used nationally to indicate "No Standing" areas not otherwise marked by signs. Solid white lines are also used to indicate kerbside parking, pedestrian and bicycle lanes, and other kerbside features. In cities with tramway networks, double yellow lines separate the tramway from the road. Yellow line markings are also used in areas that receive regular annual snowfall to provide contrast. Double-line markings are used to separate traffic flowing in opposite directions on busy roads.

Solid white lines are used to mark an intersection that a driver must stop at before entering whilst obeying all right-of-way laws. Dashed white lines are used to mark an intersection at which a driver must give way. Dashed white lines are also commonly used to indicate turns in intersections and to indicate intersections where a diamond turn is possible (intersections in which two cars travelling in opposite directions turn to the same direction of travel as each other without coming into contact).

Materials used are waterborne paint, thermoplastics, and cold-applied plastic (PMMA), all with glass beads. Bead is generally 1mm for longitudinal marking. Currently moving to performance-specified contracts with the primary performance indicator being retro-reflectivity measured with 30 m (98 ft) geometry instruments. Intervention levels vary generally from 100 to 150 mcd/lux/m^{2} (from 0.029 to 0.044 foot-lamberts).

==== New Zealand ====
Although New Zealand follows the convention of a solid yellow line to indicate no passing on roads with two-way traffic, it uses 3 m-long (9 ft 10 in) dashed white lines with a 7 m (23 ft) gap to indicate when passing against opposing traffic is allowed on two-lane roads and shorter ones to separate lanes going in the same direction. The New Zealand convention followed the USA MUTCD convention common between 1961 and the early 1970s.

New Zealand road markings are governed/standardised by Part 2 of the Manual Of Traffic Signs And Markings (MOTSAM).
