= Silent cop =

Traffic management device

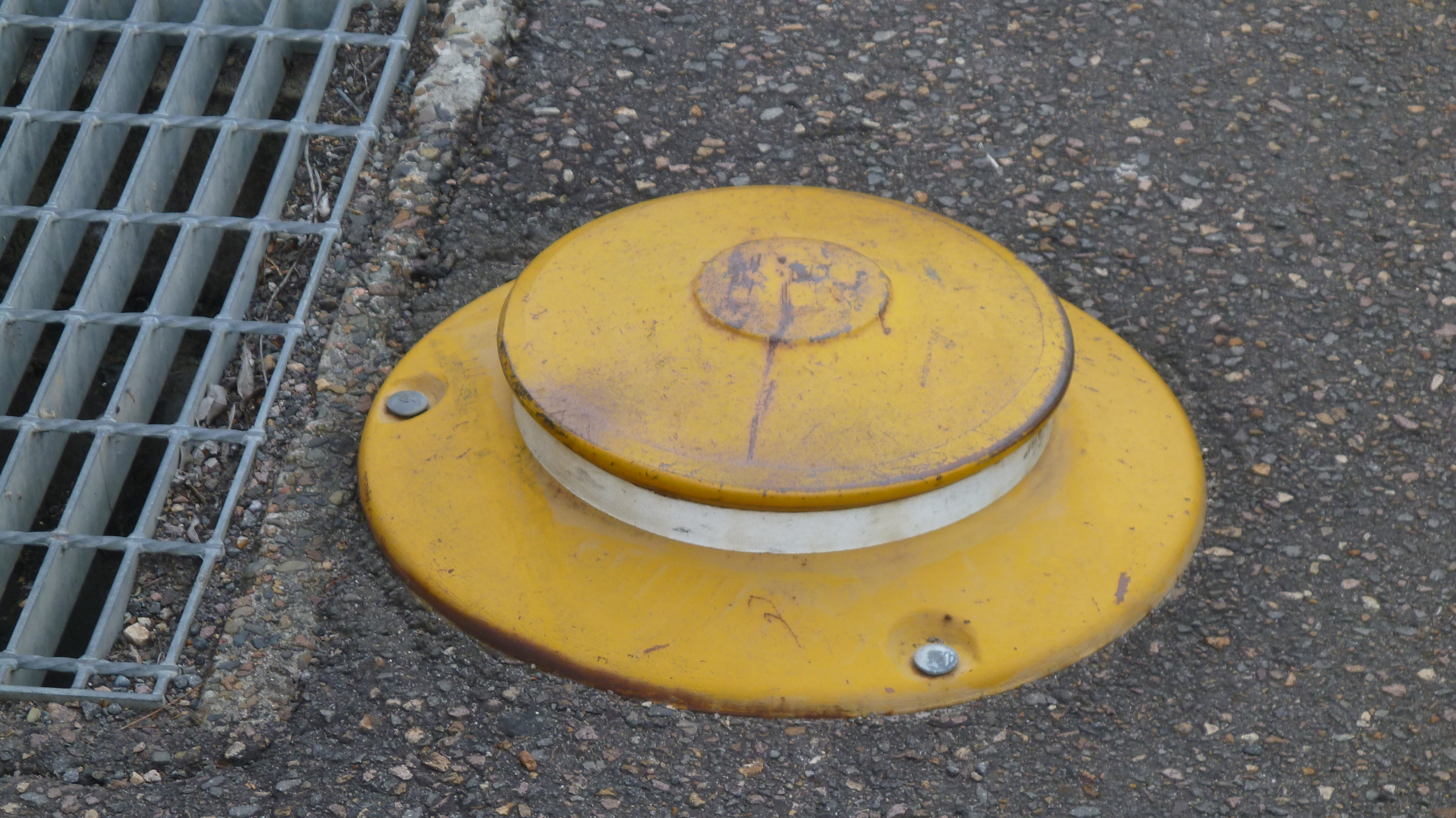

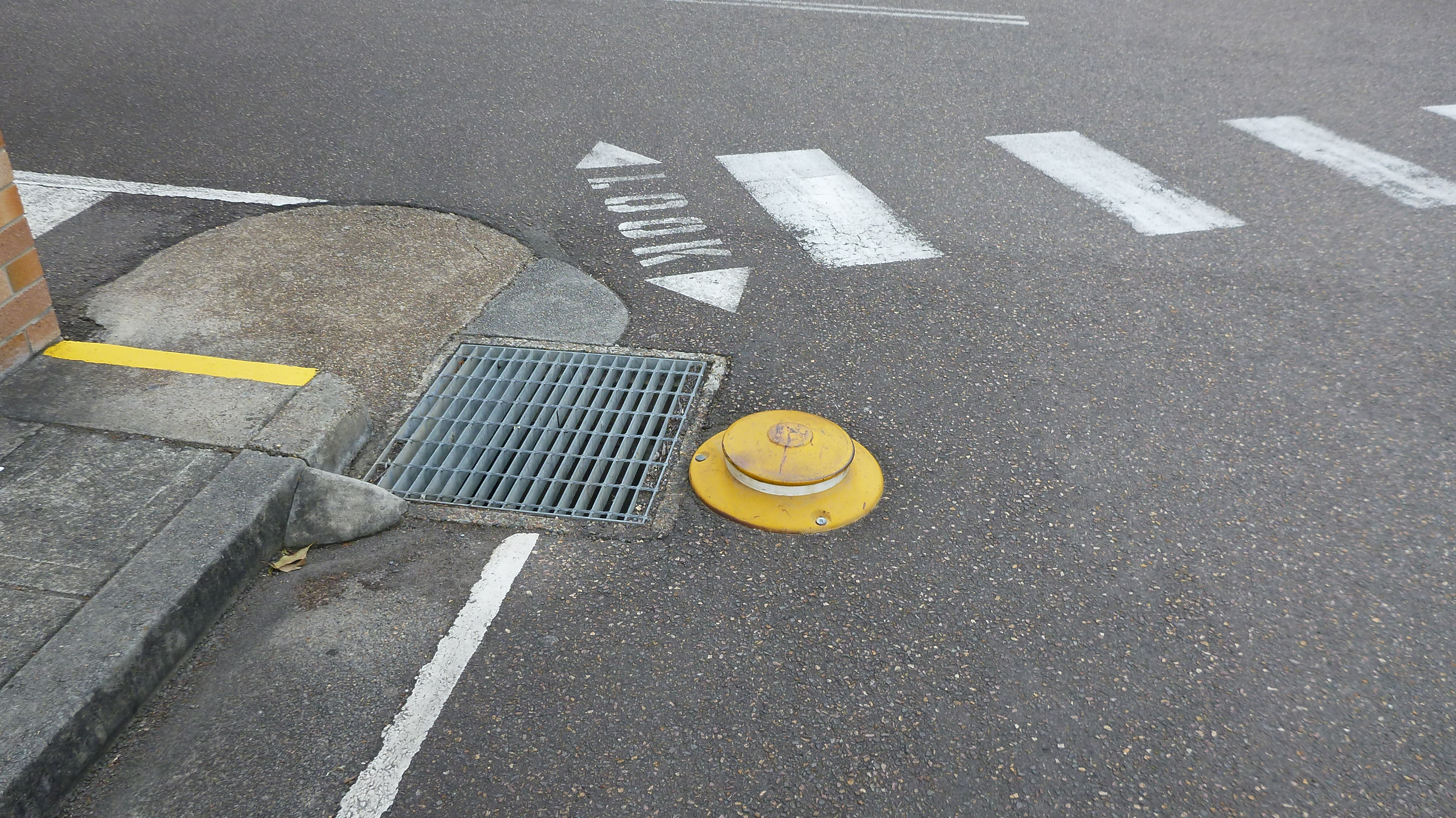
A silent cop in use at Hunter Valley Private Hospital in Shortland New South Wales, in December 2012.

A silent cop, also referred to as a "sleeping policeman" (Note: In some languages, such as Bulgarian and British English, "sleeping policeman" refers to a speed bump.) or a "traffic dome", is a traffic management device formerly widely used in Australia. It consisted of a metal or concrete dome, about 400 mm (16 in) wide and about 125 mm (5 in) tall, embedded in the road surface. They were usually painted yellow and often decorated with retro-reflective glass beads or "cats eyes". The name has its origins from the Northern Beaches area of Sydney and was derived from the early days of motoring when policemen would be deployed at busy street corners to direct traffic, before traffic signals became widespread.

Silent cops were placed in the middle of street intersections at cross roads, and turning drivers were expected to drive around one, keeping it to the right of the vehicle when turning right or left. They were also placed in the centre of the terminating street at T-intersections to force drivers turning in or out of the street to be on the correct side of the road rather than cut the corner.

The use of "silent cops" has been phased out in Australia, due to changes in the recommended method of performing turns (the introduction of the diamond turn at signalised intersections), and the hazard they posed to motorcyclists and pedestrians.
