= June McCarroll =

Nurse; popularized road lane striping

June Adaline Whittlesey Hill Robertson McCarroll
- Born: June Adaline Whittlesey; June 30, 1867; Lewis County, New York, US
- Died: March 30, 1954 (aged 86)
- Education: Allopathic Medical College, Chicago
- Occupations: Nurse and physician
- Employer(s): Nebraska State Schools, Bureau of Indian Affairs, Southern Pacific Railroad
- Known for: Painting the first striped lines on highways (disputed); starting the Coachella Library
- Spouses: Timothy Preston Hill, 1896-1900; James R. Robertson, 1900-1914; Frank McCarroll, m. 1916

June McCarroll (June 30, 1867 – March 30, 1954) is credited by the California Department of Transportation with the idea of delineating highways with a painted line to separate lanes of highway traffic, although this claim is disputed by the Federal Highway Administration and the Michigan Department of Transportation as two Michigan men painted centerlines before her. She was born in Lewis County, New York. She was a nurse (later a physician) with the Southern Pacific Railroad in the early 20th century. According to a historic marker in Indio, California, after a near-collision in her Model T in 1917, "She personally painted the first known stripe in California on Indio Boulevard, then part of (what would become in later years) U.S. Route 99, during 1917."

== Early life ==
McCarroll was born and raised in the Adirondacks. McCarroll's mother Adaline died December 9, 1867, when McCarroll was only five months old. By the 1880 census, her now remarried father, and his family was living in Emporia, Kansas, where he served a time as mayor. By 1888 her father had abandoned his second wife and son in Kansas and moved to Los Angeles, California, where McCarroll later joined him. On December 31, 1896, June Adaline Whittelsey, age 29, married Timothy Preston Hill, age 36, in Los Angeles, in a ceremony performed by Rev. J. Thomson of the Unity Church. Hill was a Massachusetts native living in Los Angeles as early as 1888. The 1900 Los Angeles census shows McCarroll as June Hill, physician, married three years but no husband in household. According to the 1910 census, 1900 was the year of McCarroll's second marriage to James R. Robertson.

McCarroll attended a medical college in Chicago, then eventually moved back to Southern California in 1904 with her second husband, James R. Robertson. They had hoped that the desert climate would help him recuperate from tuberculosis, but Robertson died in 1914. Within two years, she had remarried, this time to Frank Taylor McCarroll, the local station manager for the Southern Pacific Railroad. From 1907 to 1916, she was the only physician regularly practicing in the vast desert between the Salton Sea and Palm Springs. She was also the only physician serving the five Indian reservations in the area on behalf of the Bureau of Indian Affairs.

== Highway marking ==
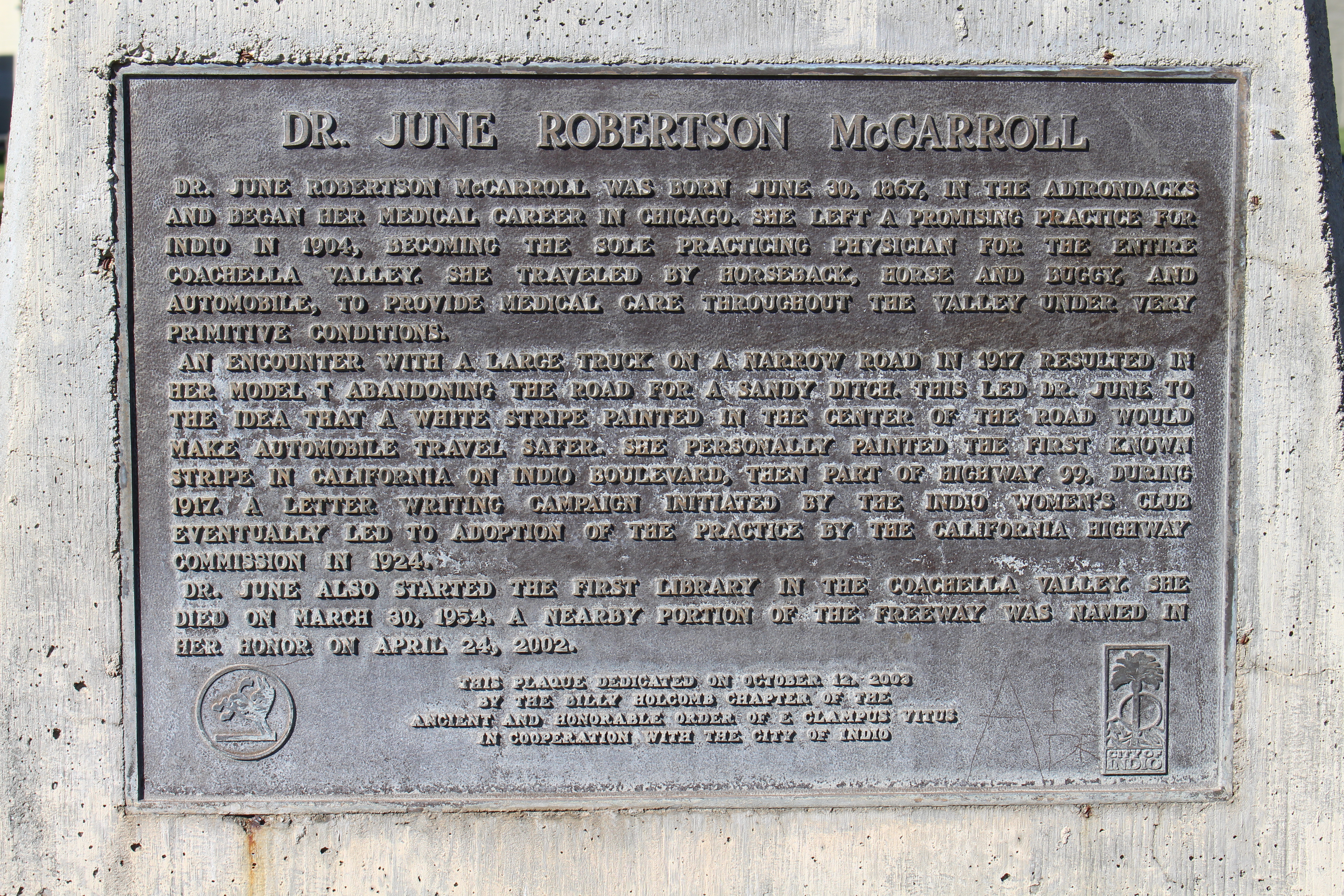
The 2003 memorial plaque

In the fall of 1917, McCarroll was driving on the road leading to her office near Indio, California, on a stretch of highway that would later be incorporated into U.S. Route 99; the highway remains today as part of Indio Boulevard. She was run off the road by a truck, as she recalled many years later:

My Model T Ford and I found ourselves face to face with a truck on the paved highway. It did not take me long to choose between a sandy berth to the right and a ten-ton truck to the left! Then I had my idea of a white line painted down the center of the highways of the country as a safety measure.

McCarroll soon communicated her idea to the local chamber of commerce and the Riverside County Board of Supervisors, with no success. Finally, she took it upon herself to hand-paint a white stripe down the middle of the road, thus establishing the actual width of the lane to prevent similar accidents. Through the Indio Women's Club and many similar women's organizations, McCarroll launched a vigorous statewide letter writing campaign on behalf of her proposal. In November 1924, the idea was adopted by the California Highway Commission and 3,500 miles (5,600 km) of lines were painted at a cost of $163,000 (equivalent to $2.36 million in 2024). Later the idea was adopted worldwide.

On April 24, 2002, to honor her contribution to road safety, California officially designated the stretch of Interstate 10 near Indio east of the Indio Boulevard/Jefferson Street exit as "The Doctor June McCarroll Memorial Freeway." In October 2003, a memorial plaque honoring McCarroll was placed on a small concrete obelisk next to the intersection of Indio Boulevard and Fargo Street in Indio, California. The plaque is located at GPS coordinates 33°43.260′N 116°13.040′W.

The Federal Highway Administration has acknowledged Kenneth I. Sawyer of the Marquette County Road Commission in Michigan for painting the first highway centerline in 1917 on what was then M-15 (part of the modern County Road 492). Photographs from 1917 of the Michigan location clearly show the centerline in place during that summer, before McCarroll's fall 1917 incident. The first centerline was painted by Edward N. Hines in the Detroit area in 1911 on a city street, so neither can lay claim to the very first centerline in the country; for his efforts, Hines was awarded the first Paul Mijksenaar Design for Function Award in Amsterdam in 2011.
