= Diamond turn =

A diamond turn is a kind of turning manoeuvre used by motor vehicles at four-way intersections.

== Details ==
If a driver approaches a four-way intersection and wishes to make a turn opposite of their side of the road (e.g. a right turn if driving on the left side of the road, as in the UK or Australia), they should turn in a wide arc that passes close to the centre of the intersection.

This is nowadays the standard type of driver's-side turning manoeuvre at a four-way intersection other than a roundabout. In particular, at intersections with traffic lights, it enables a traffic signal phase to allow traffic approaching the intersection from two opposing directions to both turn right simultaneously without colliding.

The diamond turn is distinguished from a historically required manoeuvre wherein drivers simultaneously turning right from opposing directions were required to turn around a silent cop in the centre of the intersection, which resulted in the two vehicles looping past one another with their driver's sides adjacent. This type of turn is still practiced at four-way roundabouts where those making a turn opposite of the side of the road must turn around the central traffic island but was eliminated from all other four-way intersections, as it requires those turning right from one direction to cross right turning traffic from the other direction.
