= Utility cut =

Road repair technique

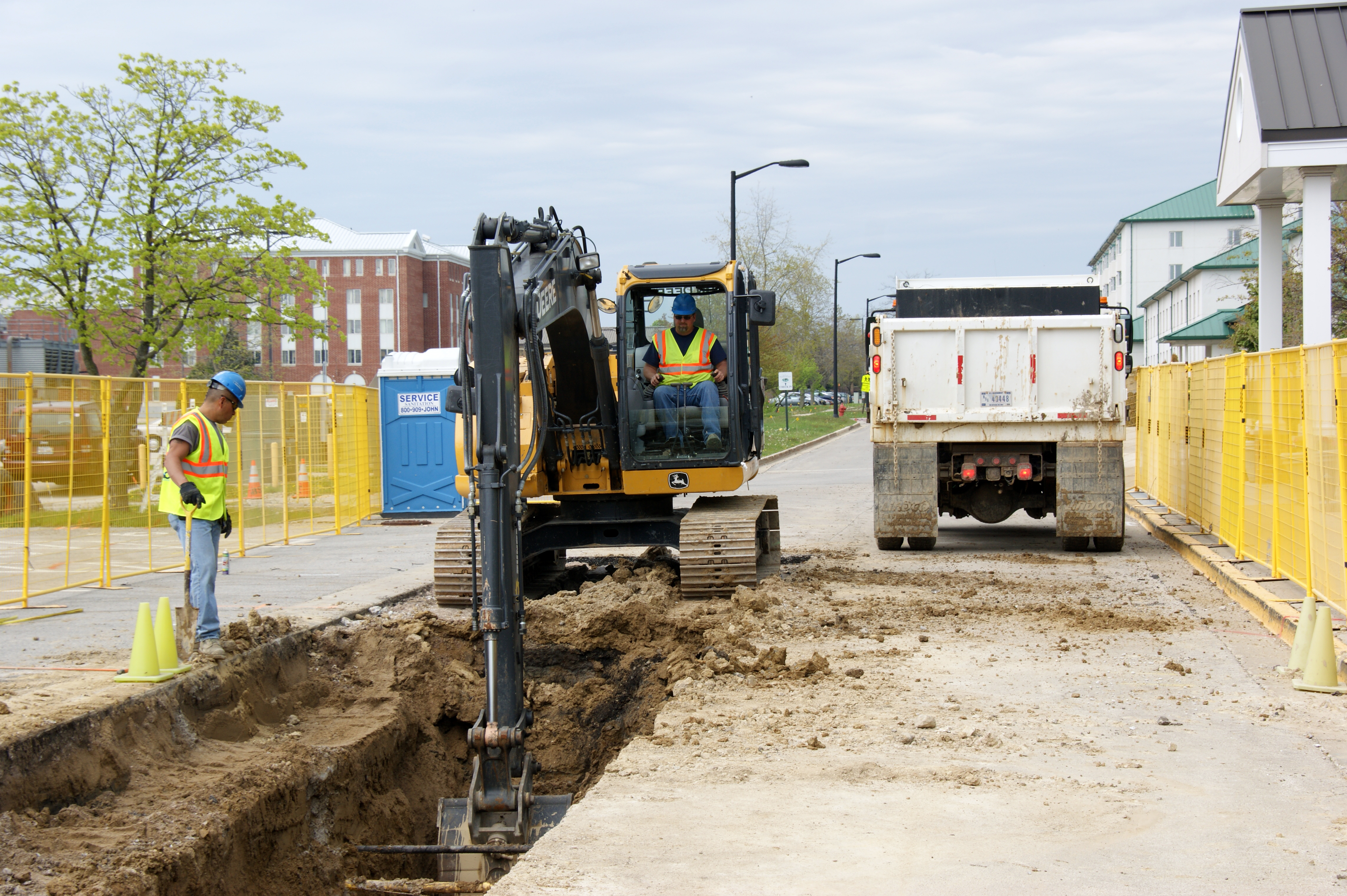
A utility cut on a road to install water main

A utility cut is a cut and excavation to an existing road surface to install or repair subterranean public utility conduits and equipment. After the utility is installed or repaired, the road needs to be restored which will result in patches on the road surface. Due to a different settling rate of the backfill material relative to the original pavement, the road surface condition may be deteriorated after the road restoration. This will require ongoing maintenance and repairs.

Some municipalities require contractors to install utility repair tags to identify responsible parties of the deteriorated patches.

== See also ==
- Subsurface utility engineering
- Utility vault
