= Utility repair tag =

Road patch identification marker

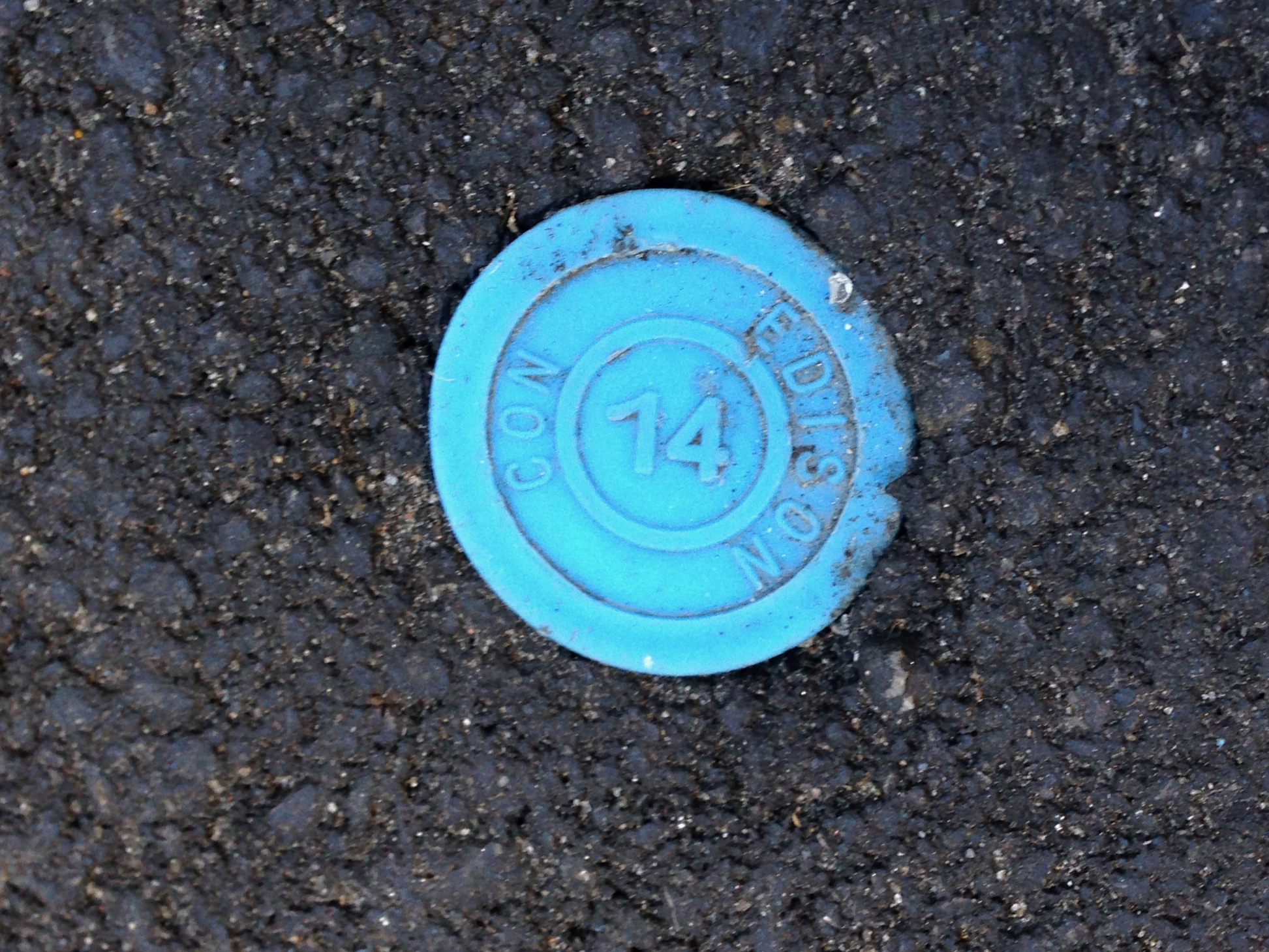
Utility repair tag for a patch in New York City made by Con Edison in 2014

Utility repair tag (also known as A-tag, asphalt tag and road cut medallion) is a plastic color-coded pavement marker embedded in the top surface of an asphalt utility cut restoration to identify the responsible party of that pavement repair or patch. The tag is not to be used for identification of an underground utility location.

== History ==
In 1987, a patent application was filed by Richard E. Sanchez to create a flat disc plastic wafer to be used as a utility cut patch identification tag. Prior to that, government regulations required identification washer to be nailed into the pavement, which created many issues. Subsequently, Sanchez made an improvement to add legs to the plastic disc and filed for another patent in 1989. However, the invention was not used for its intended purpose. The tags were used by many municipalities as call before you dig warning markers instead.

In 2006, New York City Department of Transportation initiated its A-tag program. The goal was to use the tags to clearly identify the responsible party and the year for each of those pavement patches. Prior to the program, the city used painted color which did not contain enough information to identify the responsible party. Some painted marks could identify the responsible party such as yellow "E" marks for Con Edison. The E mark may also include the year such as "E7" for patches made by Con Edison in 2007. However, the painted marks were not consistent.

After Thomas Menino, Mayor of Boston, drove on a patch that was settled and he wanted to have it fixed. The city was unable to identify the contractor who were responsible for that patch. That caused the city to search for a solution and eventually adopt the same utility repair tag approach in 2011.

City of Syracuse, New York adopted its "road cut medallion" program in 2016.

Pittsburgh revised its Right-of-Way Procedures Policy in 2017 to require utility repair tags for all utility cut repairs.

== Specifications ==
Utility repair tags inserted before the compaction

Utility repair tags are color coded. The assigned colors may vary depending on municipality regulations. For example, city of Boston and city of Cambridge, Massachusetts use blue for patches made by water utilities, orange for telecommunication companies, yellow for gas utilities, red for electric companies, gray for city contractors, and green for private contractors. On the other hand, Syracuse uses green color for sewer utility cuts. New York City uses a completely different color scheme. The colors are assigned to particular companies or agencies rather than types of utilities. For example, different shades of yellow tags are used for Empire City Subway, Long Island Power Authority, and Buckeye Pipeline. Two shades of blue are for Con Edison and cable companies.

Information on the tags includes the company name, agency name or private contractor number, and two digit year in the middle. In case of Boston, the tags also include permittee's bond number.

Sizes of the top of utility repair tags are between 1.5 inches (3.8 cm) and 2.5 inches (6.4 cm). They should be made of a UV stable Polypropylene material. They should have anchor legs with locking steps to prevent the tags from dislodging from the pavement surface.

Other specifications include how many tags to be installed based on the sizes of the patches, prohibition of using nails, installation procedure on pressing the tags in asphalt before compaction and they should be flushed to the surfaces, and how long the tags should be in place.

=== Dual-purpose tags ===
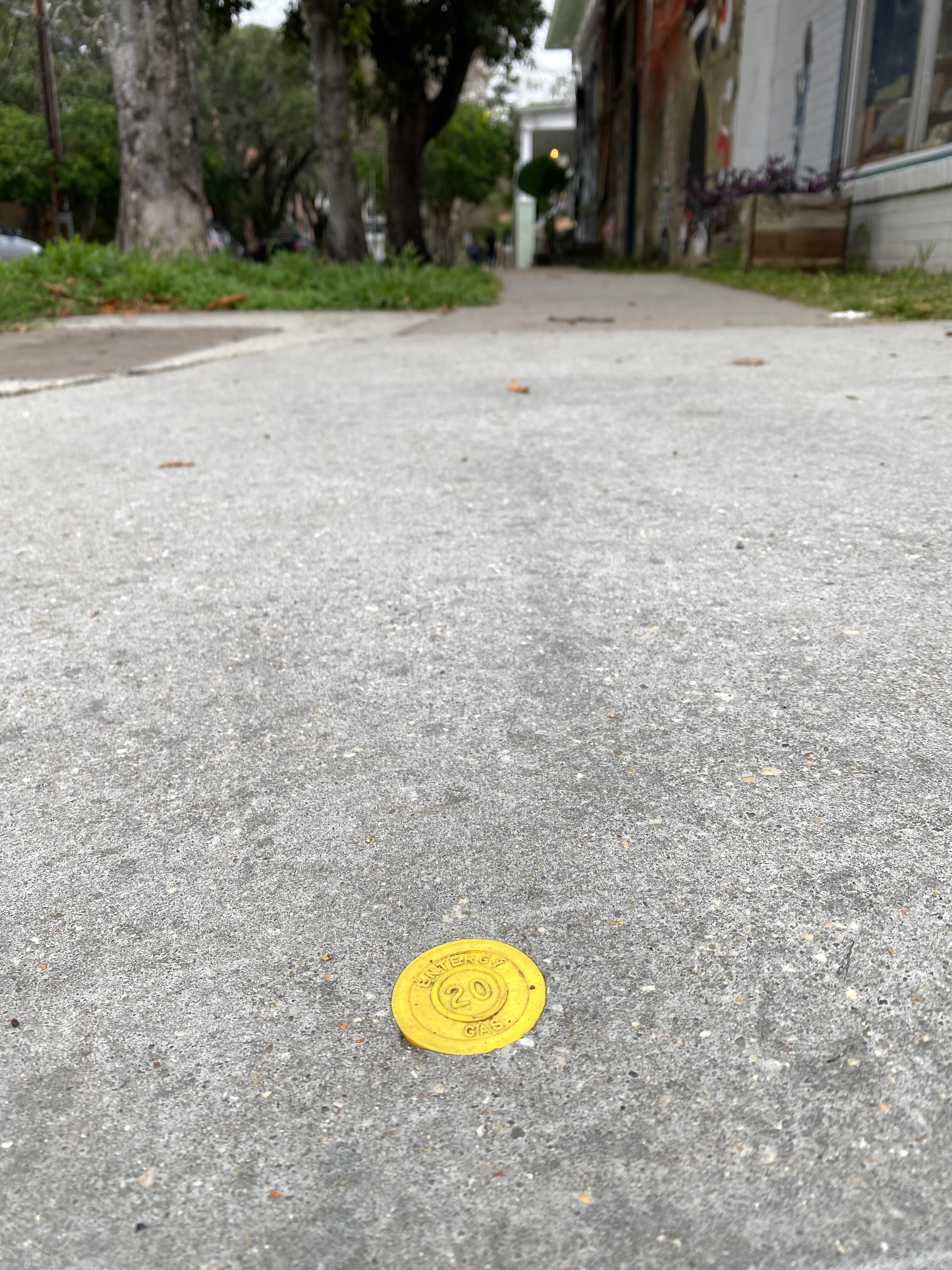
Utility repair tag on a concrete sidewalk in New Orleans

Some utility companies use utility repair tags as dual-purpose tags. They embed the tags in concrete sidewalk restorations after installing underground utilities. This is to help municipalities to quickly identify the responsible parties of the utility cut repairs. Additional benefit is to have the tags to be visible enough to warn excavators of the utility locations.

=== Alternatives ===
A research in Indiana proposed to use radio-frequency identification (RFID) tags to be embedded in the pavements and patches. The information related to a given patch can be read by RFID readers on pavement monitoring vehicles.

== See also ==
- Utility cut
- Utility location
