= List of people from Halifax, West Yorkshire =

People from Halifax, West Yorkshire, England

This is a list of people from Halifax, a town in West Yorkshire, England. They include actors, comedians, artists, television presenters, footballers and rugby players. A native of Halifax is referred to as a Haligonian, a demonym shared with Halifax in Nova Scotia. This list is arranged alphabetically by surname:

Table of contents:
A B C D E F G H I J K L M N O P Q R S T U V W X Y Z

== B ==
- Tom Bailey, singer with Thompson Twins
- Richard Bedford, singer
- Phyllis Bentley, novelist
- Sarah Blackwood, singer with Dubstar
- Bramwell Booth, former Salvation Army General
- Harry "Hbomberguy" Brewis, leftist internet personality
- John Briercliffe, apothecary
- Henry Briggs, mathematician
- Phil Bull, mathematician, professional punter, founder of world-renowned horseracing analysts Timeform

== C ==
- Alan Carter, Road racer 250cc. Youngest ever winner of a Grand Prix. Le Mans (1983)
- Kenny Carter, Speedway Rider. British Champion 1984 1985. World Pairs champion 1983
- John Reginald Halliday Christie, the murderer from 10 Rillington Place
- Hannah Cockroft, athlete/double Paralympic gold medallist
- Shirley Crabtree, wrestler professionally known as 'Big Daddy'

== D ==
- Jon Driver, scientist
- George Dyson, composer

== G ==
- Elena Greenhill Blaker (1875–1915) outlaw active in Patagonia

== H ==
- David Hartley, philosopher
- Charlie Hodgson, rugby union fly half for England and Saracens
- Nick Holmes, singer of the band Paradise Lost
- Charles Horner, jeweller and inventor of the Dorcas thimble

== I ==
- Barrie Ingham, actor
- Chris Illingworth, pianist of the band Gogo Penguin

== K ==
- John Kettley, weather forecaster

== L ==
- Don Lang, musician
- John Lawton, singer in the band Uriah Heep
- Anne Lister, diarist and former owner of Shibden Hall

== M ==
- John Mackintosh, created Mackintosh's Toffee, which became Rowntree Mackintosh

== N ==
- Thomas Nettleton, local physician who carried out some of the earliest systematic programs of smallpox vaccination

== P ==
- Wilfred Pickles – radio broadcaster, newsreader and host of Have a Go, born in Halifax
- Eric Portman – film and stage actor, born in Akroydon, Halifax

== S ==
- Sir Richard Saltonstall, colonist
- Percy Shaw, inventor of Cat's Eyes, used on public roads
- Ed Sheeran, singer-songwriter, born in Halifax
- Oliver Smithies, geneticist, physical biochemist; Nobel prizewinner

== W ==
- John E. Walker, biochemist, Nobel prizewinner
- Laura Annie Willson, engineer and suffragette
