= Reflecting roadstud =

Reflecting roadstud may refer to:

- the cat's eye, a retroreflective safety device used in road marking
- Reflecting Roadstuds Ltd, the company founded by the inventor of the cat's eye
