= Corner reflector =

Retroreflector with three orthogonal, intersecting flat surfaces

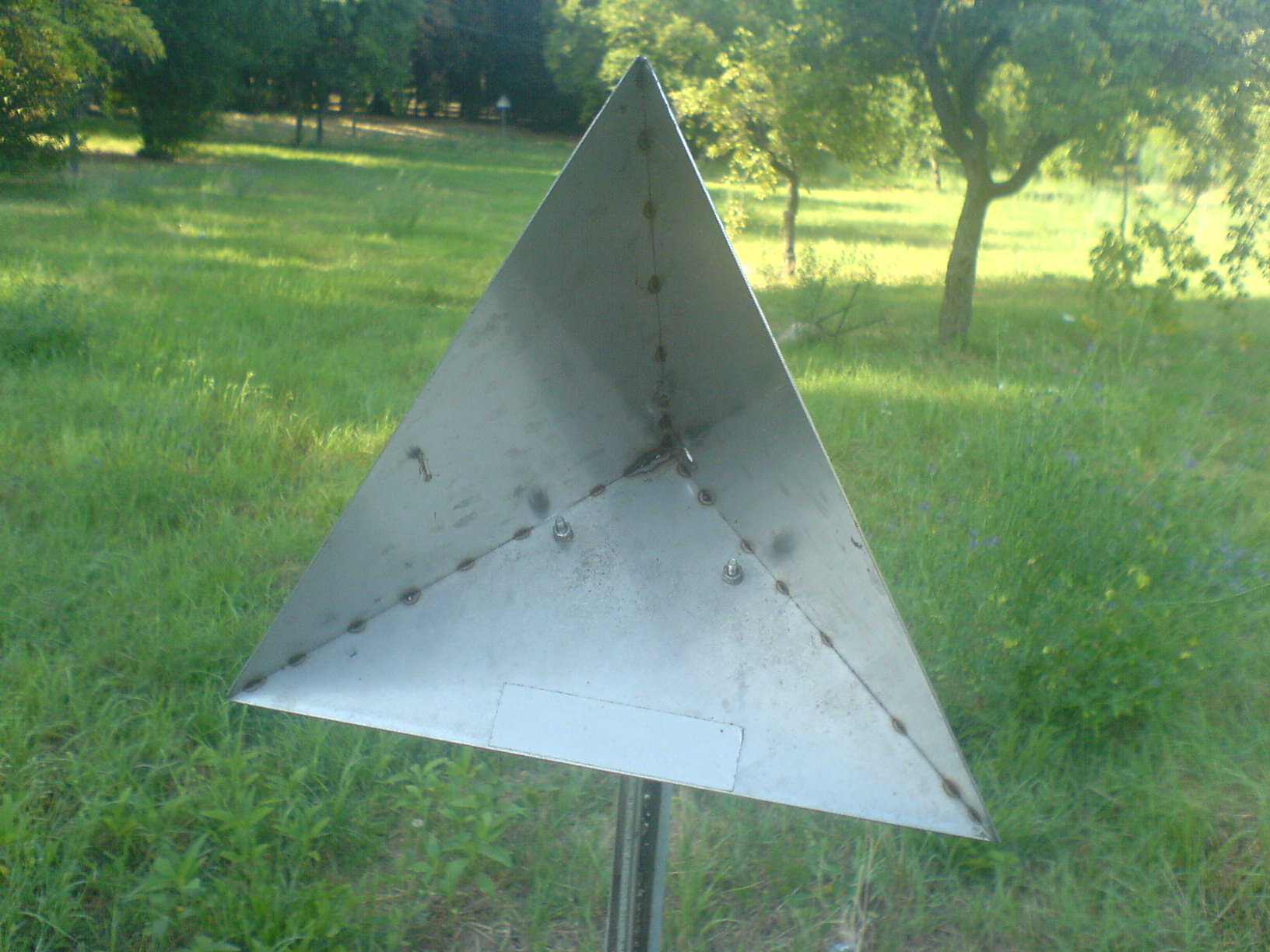
Corner reflector for radar testing

Corner reflector with 5 metres edge of the German Aerospace Center for the calibration of space-based remote-sensing radars: The edge length is 5 metres.

A corner reflector is a retroreflector consisting of three mutually perpendicular, intersecting flat reflective surfaces. It reverses the direction of an incoming wave by translation via reflections from the three orthogonal sides. The three intersecting surfaces often are triangles (forming a tetrahedron) or may have square shapes. Radar corner reflectors made of metal are used to reflect radio waves from radar sets. Optical corner reflectors, called corner cubes or cube corners, made of three-sided glass prisms, are used in surveying and laser ranging.

== Principle ==
Working principle of a corner reflector. The outgoing ray from the reflector is parallel but opposite to the incoming ray with being translated. The amount of the translation depends on which part of the reflector is hit by the incoming ray; the translation is larger if the ray hits an outer part of it.

The incoming ray is reflected three times, once by each surface, which results in a reversal of direction. To see this, the three corresponding normal vectors of the corner's perpendicular sides can be considered to form a basis (a rectangular coordinate system) (x, y, z) in which to represent the direction of an arbitrary incoming ray, [a, b, c]. When the ray reflects from the first side, say x, the ray's x component, a, is reversed to −a without changing the y and z components, resulting in a direction of [−a, b, c]. Similarly, when reflected from side y and finally from side z, the b and c components are reversed. Therefore, the ray direction goes from [a, b, c] to [−a, b, c] to [−a, −b, c] to [−a, −b, −c], and it leaves the corner reflector with all three components of direction exactly reversed.

A roof mirror, sometimes called a roof prism mirror if two prisms are used to construct it, consisting of two flat reflection surfaces meeting together at the right angle, does retroreflection but only in the plane formed by the surface normals (e.g., a x-y plane if the normals are x and y axes, respectively) while the corner reflector does full retroreflection.

Animation showing the reflected rays in a corner of a cube (corner reflector principle).

== In radar ==
Corner reflectors used in radar

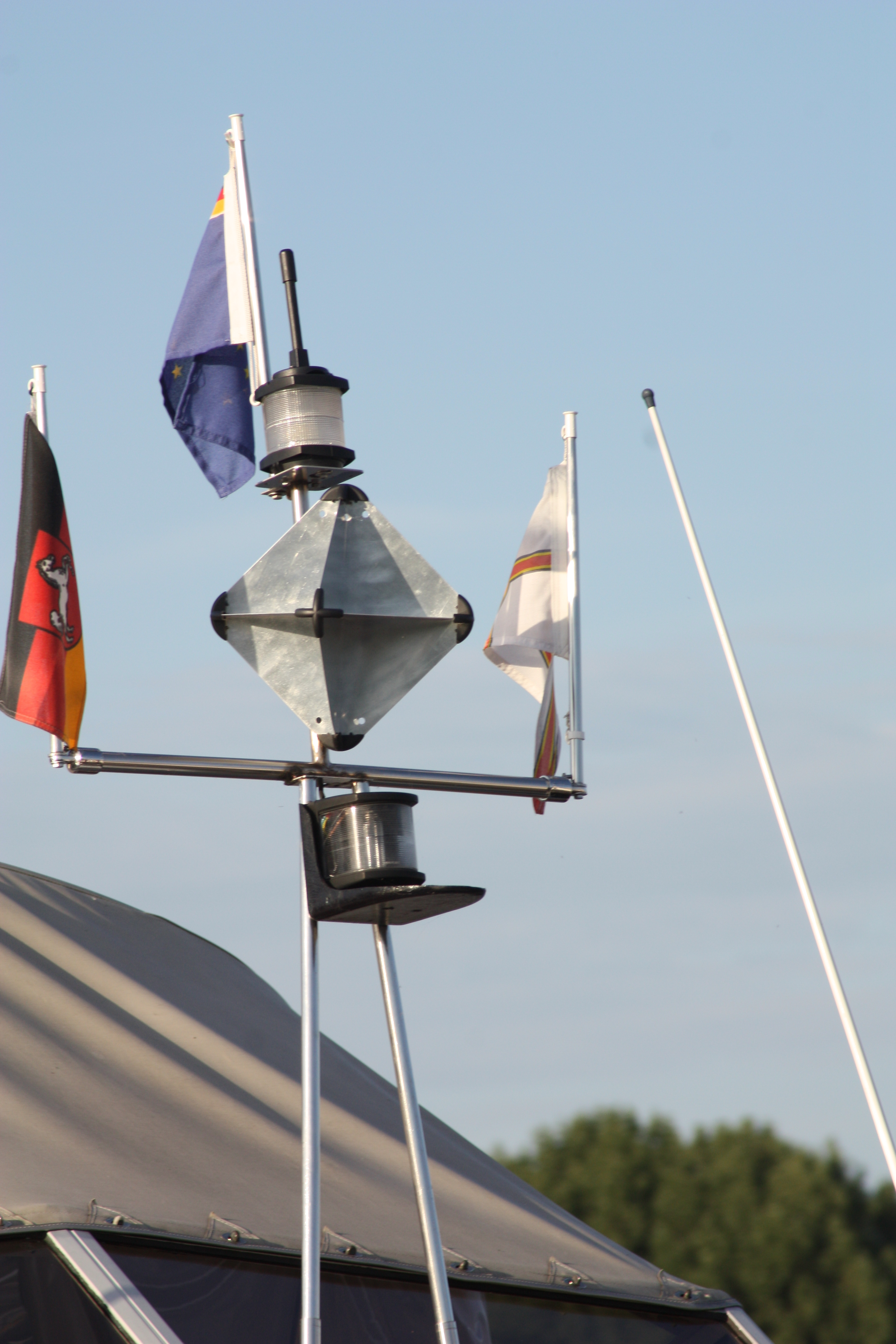
Octahedral corner reflector on the mast of a yacht.

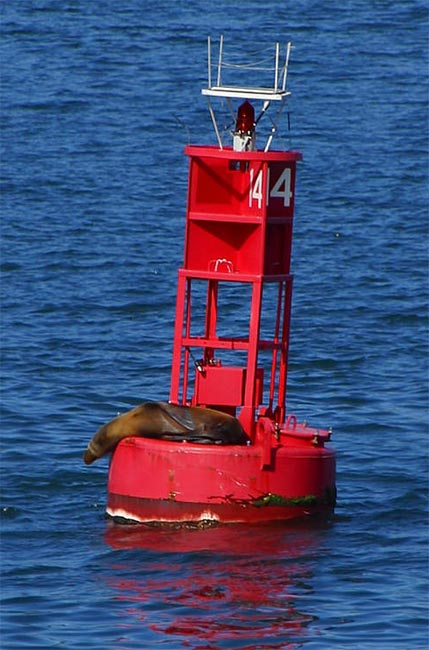
Buoy in San Diego Harbor. Metal plates near the top form corner reflectors to reflect radar signals

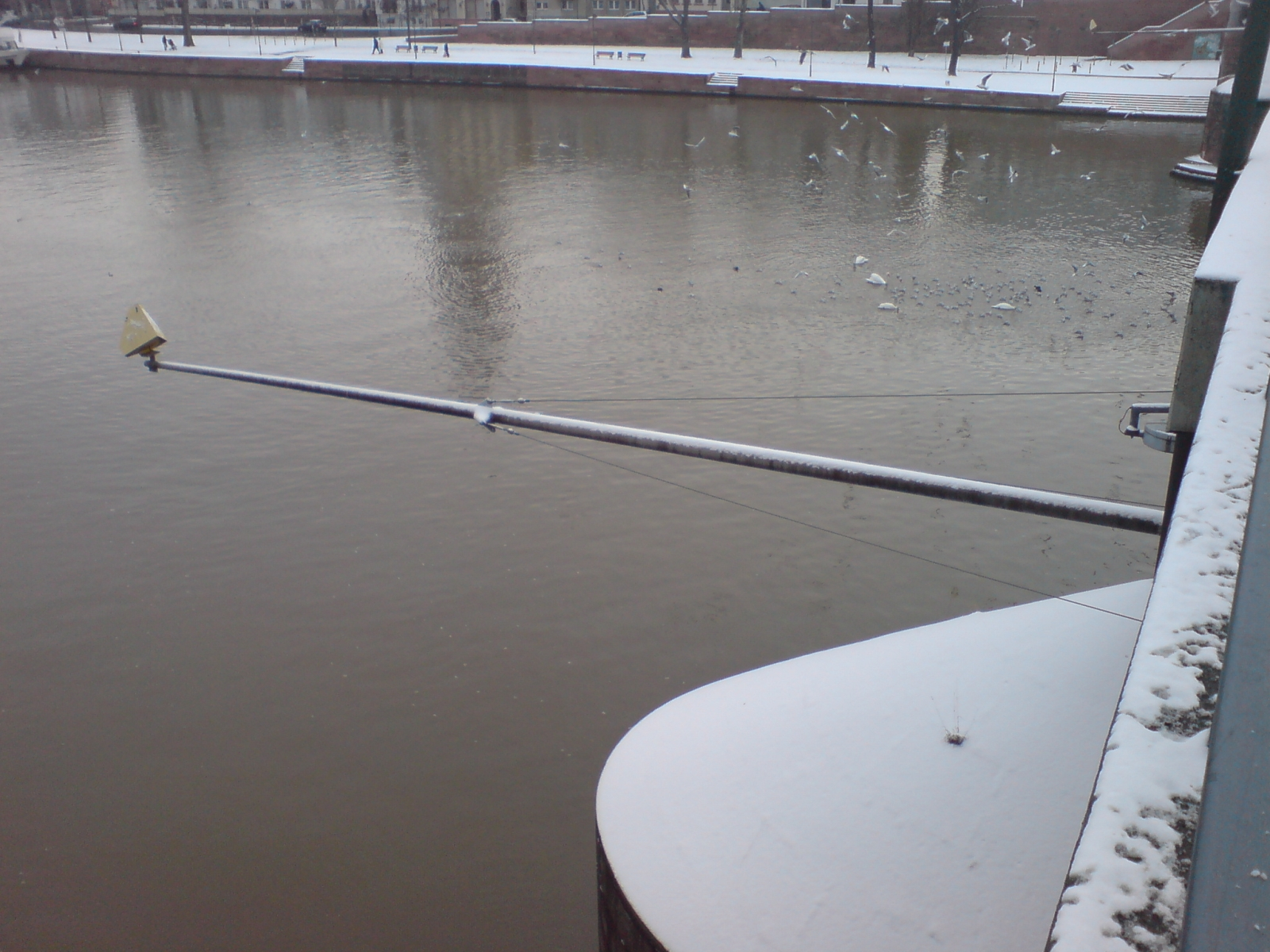
Radar reflector on an abutment of a bridge

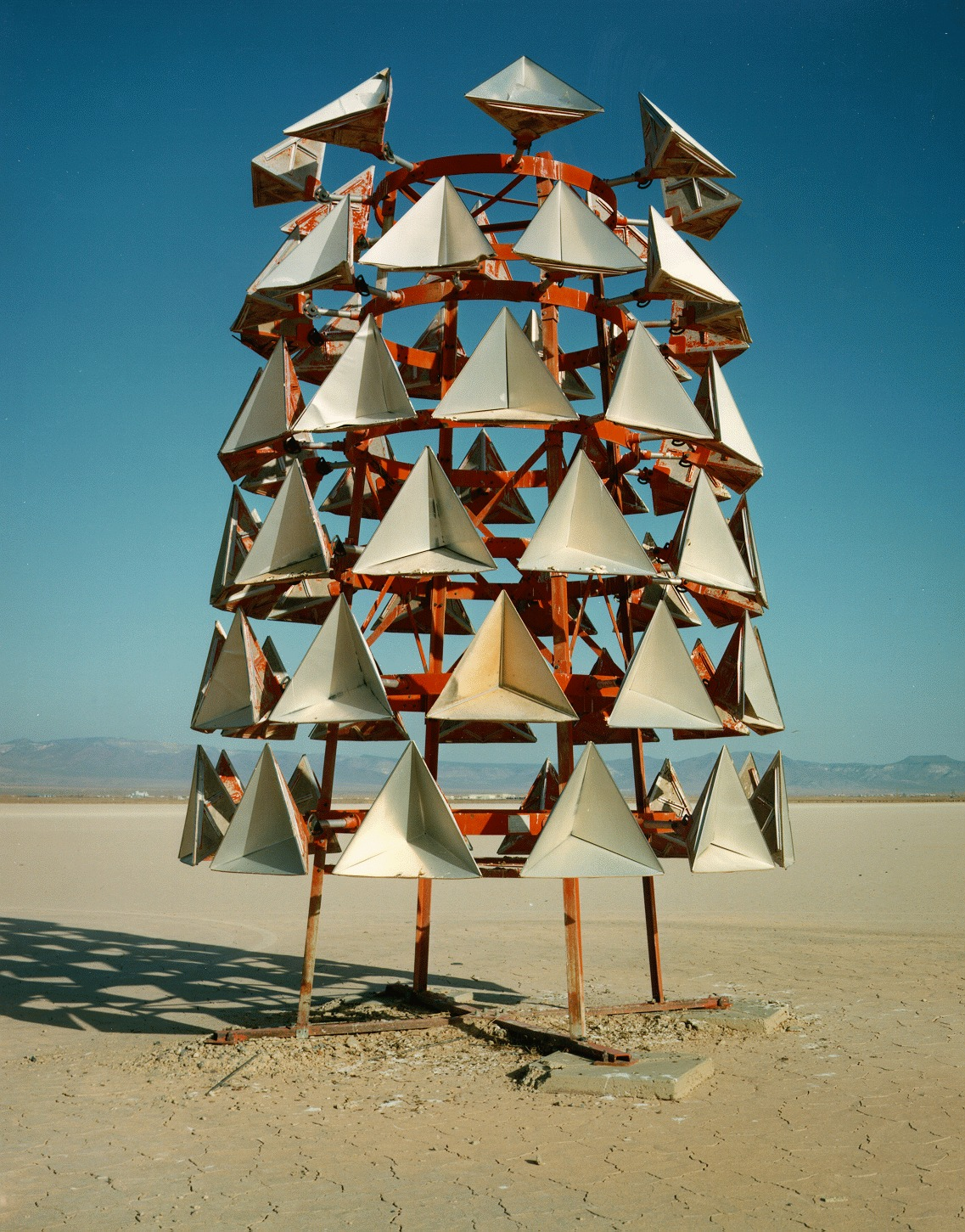
A multireflector at the Nevada Test Site used as radar target for simulated nuclear bombing

Note: The diamond-shaped corner reflector on the yacht is improperly deployed; to best reflect surface radar it should be deployed in the so-called "rain-catching" configuration so as to present an inside corner as shown on the "radar testing" image.

Radar corner reflectors are designed to reflect the microwave radio waves emitted by radar sets back toward the radar antenna. This causes them to show a strong "return" on radar screens. A simple corner reflector consists of three conducting sheet metal or screen surfaces at 90° angles to each other, attached to one another at the edges, forming a "corner". These reflect radio waves coming from in front of them back parallel to the incoming beam. To create a corner reflector that will reflect radar waves coming from any direction, 8 corner reflectors are placed back-to-back in an octahedron (diamond) shape. The reflecting surfaces must be larger than several wavelengths of the radio waves to function.

In maritime navigation they are placed on bridge abutments, buoys, ships and, especially, lifeboats, to ensure that these show up strongly on ship radar screens. Corner reflectors are placed on the vessel's masts at a height of at least 4.6 m (15 feet) above sea level (giving them an approximate minimum horizon distance of 8 kilometers or 4.5 nautical miles). Marine radar uses X-band microwaves with wavelengths of 2.5–3.75 cm (1–1.5 inches), so small reflectors less than 30 cm (12 inches) across are used. In aircraft navigation, corner reflectors are installed on rural runways, to make them show up on aircraft radar.

An object that has multiple reflections from smooth surfaces produces a radar return of greater magnitude than might be expected from the physical size of the object. This effect was put to use on the ADM-20 Quail, a small decoy missile which had the same radar cross section as a B-52.

The corner reflector is not the only efficient radar reflector design; other retroreflector designs have also seen use. Luneburg lens, for example, are used on the ADM-141 TALD.

== In optics ==
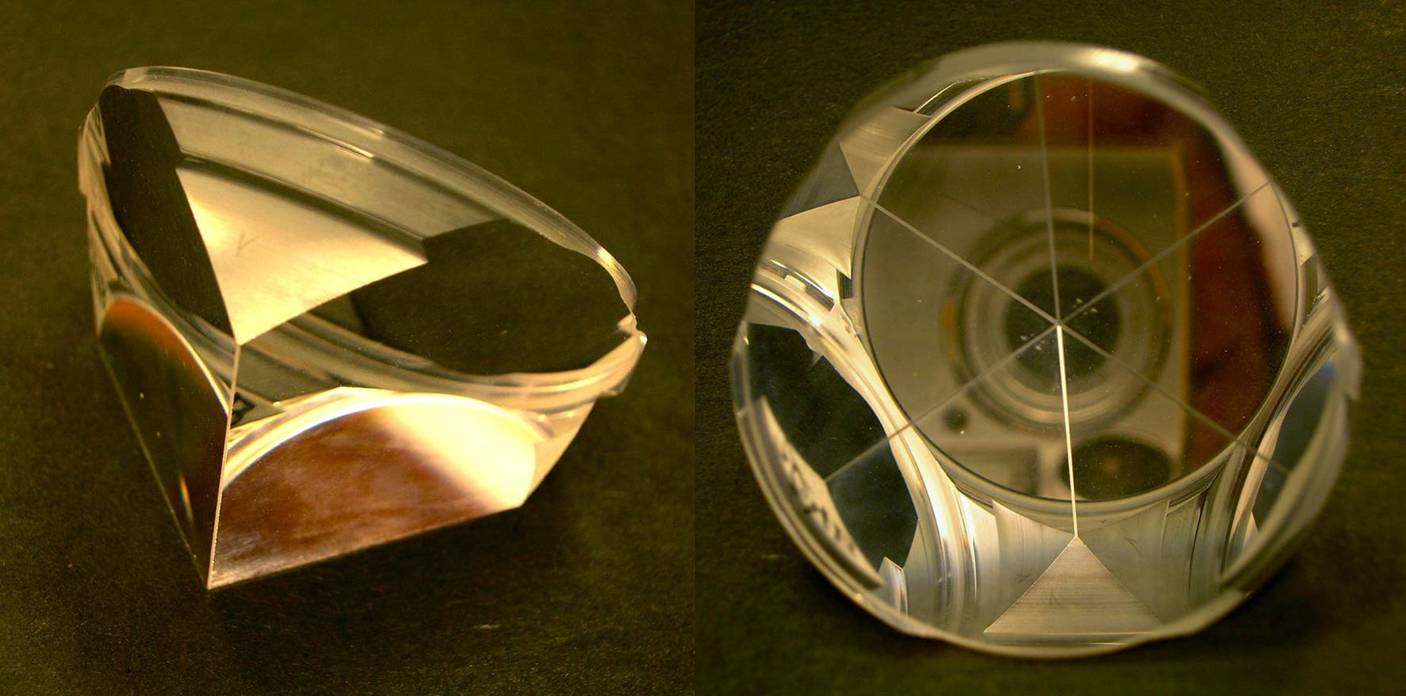
Corner cube reflector

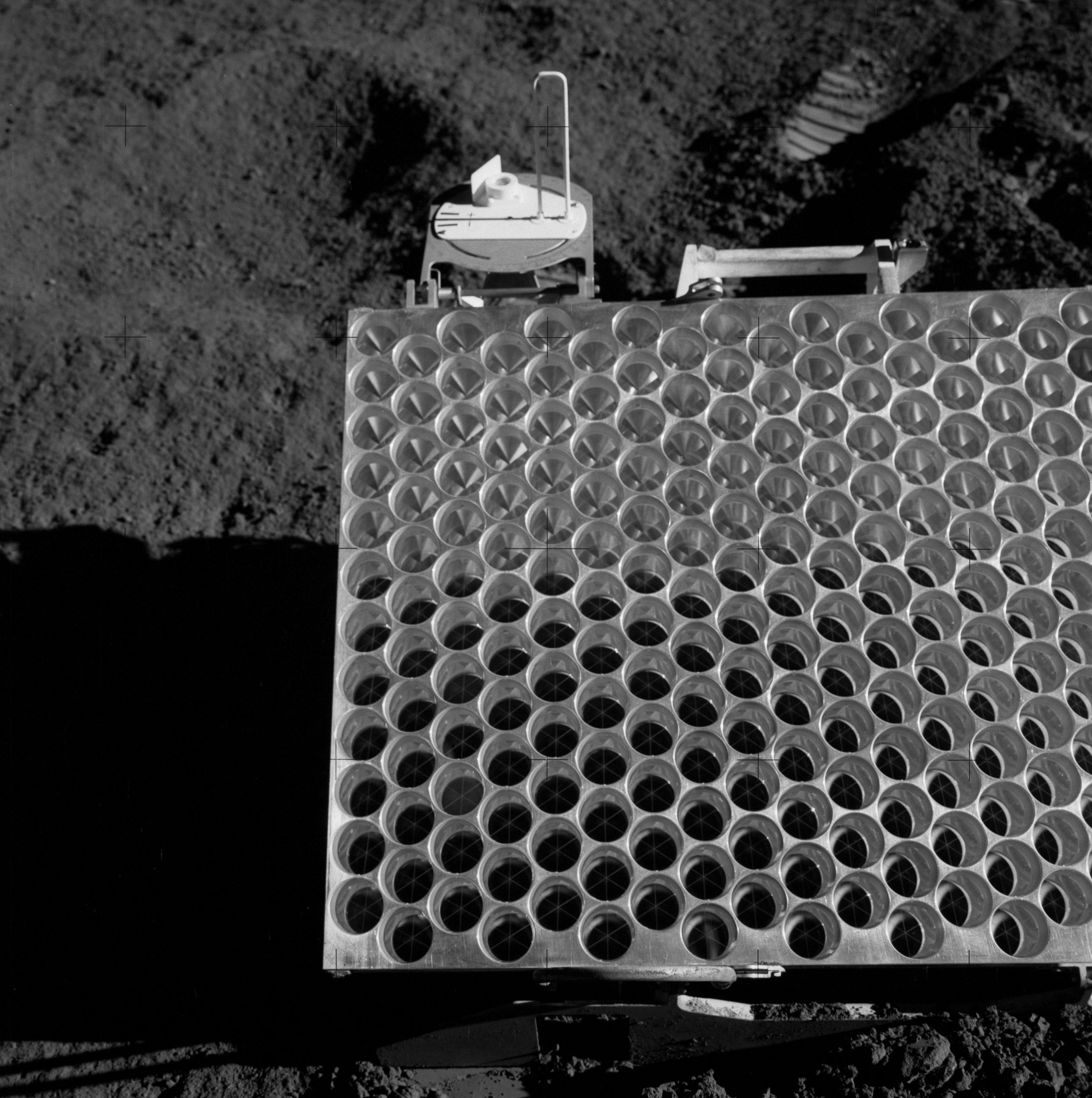
Apollo 15 Lunar Laser Ranging RetroReflector (LRRR) installed on the Moon

In optics, corner reflectors typically consist of three mirrors or reflective prism faces which return an incident light beam in the opposite direction. In surveying, retroreflector prisms are commonly used as targets for long-range electronic distance measurement using a total station.

Five arrays of optical corner reflectors have been placed on the Moon for use by Lunar Laser Ranging experiments observing a laser's time-of-flight to measure the Moon's orbit more precisely than was possible before. The three largest were placed by NASA as part of the Apollo program, and the Soviet Union built two smaller ones into the Lunokhod rovers.

Automobile and bicycle tail lights are molded with arrays of small corner reflectors, with different sections oriented for viewing from different angles. Reflective paint for visibility at night usually contains retroreflective spherical beads. Thin plastic with microscopic corner reflector structures can be used as tape, on signs, or sewn or molded onto clothing.

== Other examples ==
Corner reflectors can also occur accidentally. Tower blocks with balconies are often accidental acoustic corner reflectors and return a distinctive echo to an observer making a sharp sound noise, such as a hand clap, nearby.

== See also ==
- Cat's eye reflector – Retroreflective safety device used in road marking
- LAGEOS – NASA scientific research satellites
- Lunar Laser Ranging experiment – Measuring the distance between the Earth and the Moon with laser light
- Stealth technology – Military technology to make personnel and material less visible
