= Elena Greenhill Blaker =

Outlaw active in Patagonia at the beginning of the 20th century

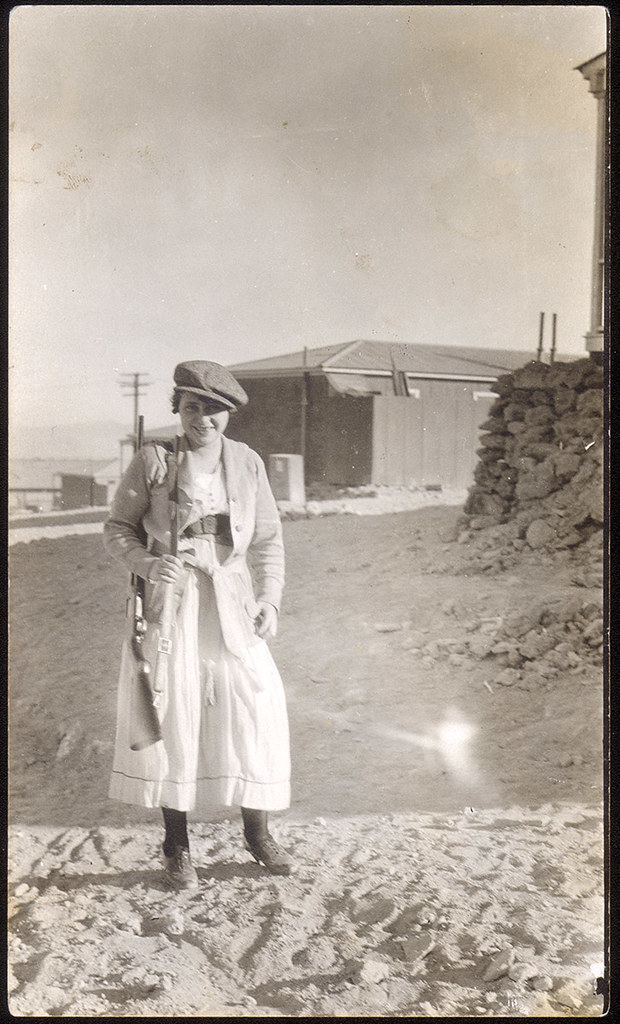
- Greenhill c. 1900
- Born: Elena Greenhill; Halifax, England, UKGBI
- Baptised: 26 June 1875
- Died: 31 March 1915 (aged 39–40); Gan Gan, Chubut Province, Argentina
- Cause of death: Shot by police
- Resting place: Gan-Gan (1915–1949); Cementerio Británico (1949)
- Other name: La Grinil
- Occupation: Outlaw
- Spouse(s): Manuel de la Cruz Astete Pinto (m. 1894; died 1905) Martín Coria (m. 1905; died 1914) Martín Taborda (m. 1914)
- Children: 2

Elena Greenhill Blaker (1875 – 13 March 1915), known as La Grinil, was a British-born outlaw active in Patagonia during the early 20th century. In 1915, Greenhill was killed during a police shootout in Gan Gan, Argentina.

== Early life ==
Elena Greenhill was born in 1875 in Halifax to John Alfred Greenhill (Note: Later Hispanicized as Juan Alfredo Greenhill.) and Frances Emma Greenhill (née Blacker). Greenhill was baptised at Christ Church in Pellon, Halifax on 26 June 1875.

In 1888, the Greenhill family immigrated to Cierro Verde, Chile (present-day Victoria) as part of the frontier settlement program. The Chilean government gave the family 40 hectares of land, oxen, tools and materials to build a house. Elena spent most of her time taking care of her younger siblings and carrying out domestic duties.

== Criminal career ==
=== Beginnings ===
On 31 May 1894, aged 19, Greenhill married Manuel de la Cruz Astete Pinto (1856–1905), a cattle rancher. Astete was supposedly a cattle raider who stole cattle from Argentina to sell on in Chile.

Greenhill and Astete settled in Choele Choel, Argentina before moving to Chelforó four years later. Greenhill joined the cattle trade and learned how to shoot a Winchester rifle. Astete later disappeared during a cattle drive to Chile. In January 1905, Astete's dead body was found 1,500 meters away from the family home with his head bashed in by stones and sticks.

Elena was the first suspect, but she was eventually cleared. Police later arrested a farm employee for the murder, who had allegedly been romantically involved with Elena. During the trail Greenhill met Martín Coria, a law student. In August 1905, Greenhill and Coria married and moved to Montón Nilo, Río Negro Province.

=== Rise to fame ===
The couple set up a general store, which they used as a front to sell stolen merchandise. Due to the dangerous nature of their life, Elena sent her children to a boarding school in Buenos Aires.

In 1909, Elena and her husband were accused of having stolen 3000 sheep from a farm in Telsen, located in northern Chubut. Chubut police sent a contingent of 17 agents, led by Police Chief Calegaris, to the Montón Nilo house to arrest them. They were assisted by Police Chief Altamirano of Río Negro police. As they approached the building, they were shot at from the windows and a long shootout ensued until a white flag was raised from one the openings and a farm employee came out to negotiate. Calegaris approached the worker with some of his officers, but was surprised by a sudden stampede, which Elena had set off intentionally. In the ensuing confusion, Calegaris was taken hostage, forcing his officers to retreat. Elena allegedly forced him to do the dishes and other house chores while keeping him prisoner, before fleeing with her husband and heading north to Buenos Aires to lay low. Calegaris was humiliated and swore revenge.

On 14 October 1914, Coria died in Buenos Aires. Elena married one of her associates, Martin Taborda, and shortly after, decided to return to the bandit life. Before leaving, Elena wrote her will, possibly anticipating that she would not return.

=== Death ===
Elena and Martin were ambushed in a pass called Angostura del Chacay, in Gan-Gan, Chubut, on March 31, 1915 by local police wearing civilian clothes. The shootout lasted an hour. Elena collapsed after being wounded, and was executed by police officer Valenciano, who shot her in the back of the neck, allegedly to make sure she wasn't playing dead. She was 42 years old. Martin managed to get away, but was arrested the following day. His lawyer protested the arrest and accused Valenciano of murder, claiming that the police officer had been following them for 24 hours and had had plenty of opportunities to arrest them in crowded public spaces, and instead chose to wait for an opportunity to attack them in a desolate location to make sure they were no witnesses. Valenciano was fired and imprisoned, but was released after one year. He moved to Santa Cruz and joined the local police force. In 1922 he was charged with the extrajudicial execution of three farm workers, who were apparently involved in left-wing groups. He was acquitted and later became a judge.

Her remains were buried in the nearby Gan-Gan cemetery until 1949, when her family exhumed them and had them moved to the Cementerio Británico in Buenos Aires.

== Personal life ==
Greenhill and Astete had two children, born in 1898 and 1900.

== Legacy ==
A nearby hill was renamed La inglesa ("The Englishwoman") in her memory.

== Trivia ==
Elena's second husband, Martin Coria, was friends with Police Chief Torino, who led the investigation on the Patagonian cannibal murders. Despite not being a member of the police, Martin participated in the investigation and later wrote to Torino while he was imprisoned.
