= Gan Gan =

- Municipality and village
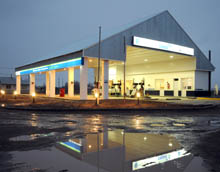

- Location of Gan Gan in Argentina
- Coordinates: 42°30′S 68°16′W
- Country: Argentina
- Province: Chubut Province
- Department: Telsen Department
- Elevation: 2,080 ft (634 m)

Population (2010)
  - Total: 661
- Time zone: UTC−3 (ART)
- Climate: BSk

Gan Gan is a village and municipality in Chubut Province in southern Argentina.

== Geography ==
=== Climate ===
This town is located in the middle of northern Patagonia, right in the steppe. Consequently, the climate is cold semi-arid (BSk, according to the Köppen climate classification) and it can be quite extreme: temperatures can range from well above 35 °C (95 °F) on the hottest summer days (but with cold, desert nights at around 10 °C or 50 °F) to lows that might reach −35 °C (−31 °F). Usually, summer days average 24 °C (75 °F) and nights 10 °C (50 °F), whereas winter days average 4 °C (40 °F) and nights, −3 °C (27 °F). Snow is relatively common and the weather is generally windy.

Climate data for Gan Gan (modelled data)
Month	Jan	Feb	Mar	Apr	May	Jun	Jul	Aug	Sep	Oct	Nov	Dec	Year
Mean daily maximum °C (°F)	24.2 (75.6)	23.3 (73.9)	19.4 (66.9)	14.2 (57.6)	9.4 (48.9)	5.4 (41.7)	4.5 (40.1)	7.0 (44.6)	10.5 (50.9)	14.7 (58.5)	18.7 (65.7)	22.2 (72.0)	14.5 (58.0)
Daily mean °C (°F)	17.3 (63.1)	16.5 (61.7)	13.1 (55.6)	8.3 (46.9)	4.6 (40.3)	1.4 (34.5)	0.4 (32.7)	2.3 (36.1)	4.9 (40.8)	8.6 (47.5)	12.2 (54.0)	15.4 (59.7)	8.8 (47.7)
Mean daily minimum °C (°F)	10.4 (50.7)	10.0 (50.0)	7.3 (45.1)	3.7 (38.7)	1.0 (33.8)	−1.5 (29.3)	−2.7 (27.1)	−1.2 (29.8)	0.4 (32.7)	2.9 (37.2)	5.8 (42.4)	8.6 (47.5)	3.7 (38.7)
Average precipitation mm (inches)	15 (0.6)	22 (0.9)	19 (0.7)	27 (1.1)	24 (0.9)	32 (1.3)	25 (1.0)	23 (0.9)	23 (0.9)	26 (1.0)	17 (0.7)	16 (0.6)	269 (10.6)
Source: Climate-Data.org

== Notable people ==
- Elena Greenhill Blaker (1875–1915), British-born outlaw; died in a police shootout in Gan Gan
