= Boothtown =

Suburb of Halifax, West Yorkshire, England

Coordinates: 53.739°N 1.868°W

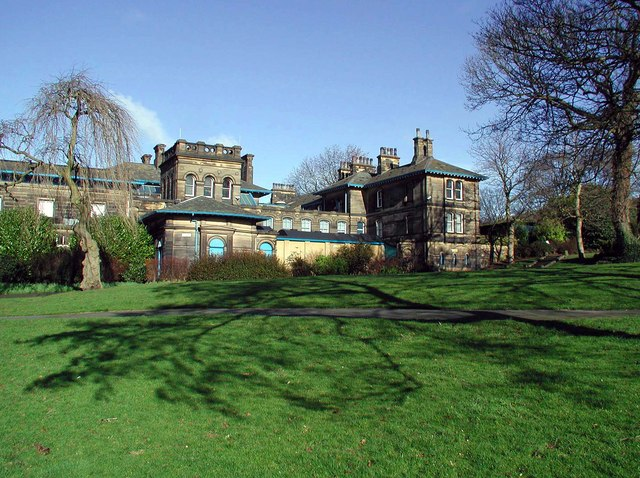
- Bankfield Museum

- Location within West Yorkshire
- OS grid reference: SE088269
  - London: 150 mi (240 km) SSE
- Metropolitan borough: Calderdale
- Metropolitan county: West Yorkshire
- Region: Yorkshire and the Humber
- Country: England
- Sovereign state: United Kingdom
- Post town: HALIFAX
- Postcode district: HX3
- Dialling code: 01422
- Police: West Yorkshire
- Fire: West Yorkshire
- Ambulance: Yorkshire
- UK Parliament: Halifax

Boothtown is a suburb of Halifax, West Yorkshire, England, which falls within Town Ward, one of the 17 wards of Calderdale.

Its history was dominated by the mills of the textile industry. Rawson's Mill on Old Lane is now disused and designated as a listed building of heritage importance.

Boothtown includes Akroydon, a Victorian model housing scheme which was designed in the Gothic style by George Gilbert Scott in 1859 for the workers at the mills of Edward Akroyd. Akroyd's former home in Boothtown, now the Grade II listed Bankfield Museum and library, also houses the Regimental museum of the Duke of Wellington's Regiment.

Boothtown is situated on the A647 road from Halifax to Bradford. It was on this road that Percy Shaw came up with the idea of cat's eyes as an aid to road safety.

The longest running Boys' Brigade Company in Calderdale is based at Boothtown.

Boothtown is the home of Saint John the Baptist Serbian Orthodox church. There has been a Serbian community in the area since the 1940s, when Serbian POWs and anti-Communist refugees from German camps arrived in Halifax in 1947. They needed a place to worship and were given a former United Methodist Church in Simpson Street to worship in. Closed in the 1950s, it was acquired by the Serbian Orthodox Church in 1952. The building, which had already deteriorated, was repaired and renovated, and was consecrated on 26 September 1954.
