= Optical square =

A pentaprism

The optical square uses a pentaprism to reflect and refract a beam or sighting 90 degrees, it is used in pairs in surveying and in a singular block in metrology.

In optical square A Horizon glass is placed at an angle of 120° with the horizon sight.

The Index glass is placed at an angle of 105° with the Index sight.

Angle between Index glass and Horizon glass is 45°.

== Metrology ==
Used with an autocollimator or angle dekkor and mirror, it can be used for machine tool axis squareness checking and for measuring the squareness of surfaces. It has two mirrors at 45 degrees to each other. One is half-silvered, called the horizon glass, and the other is fully silvered, called the index glass. It measures angles by double reflection. Two prisms can be used as an optical square.

== Optical square in surveying ==
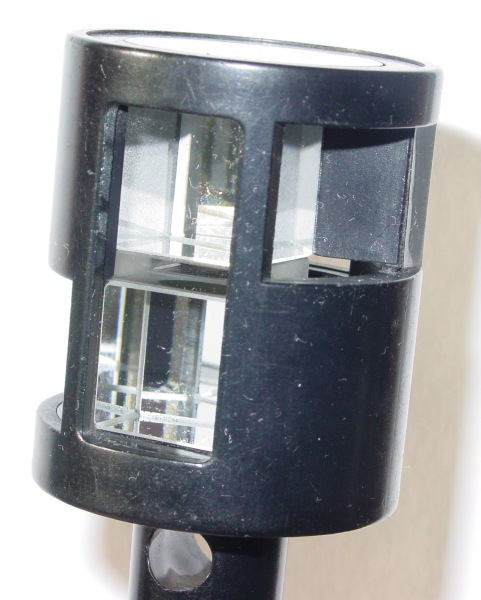
Double pentaprism as used in surveying.

In surveying it is used both as a hand held tool for sighting between two poles (often with a plumb bob hung from the handle) and also mounted on a Jacob's staff.
