= John Briercliffe =

John Briercliffe or Brearcliffe (1609?-1682), was an English antiquary. He was an apothecary in Halifax, Yorkshire where he was born, and where, on 4 December 1682, he died of a fever at the age of 63.

== Works ==
He made various collections relating to his native town and parish. His Surveye of the Housings and Lands within the Townshippe of Halifax {1648} was said to have been in the library of Halifax church, but according to John Watson, who published his History of Halifax in 1775, there had been no such thing there for twenty years. Watson says he had in his possession Halifax inquieryes for the findeinge out of severall giftes given to pious uses, written 22 December 1651. Ralph Thoresby (Vic. Leod. p. 68) refers to his catalogue of the vicars of Halifax, and inscriptions under their arms painted on tables in the library of that church.
