= Patagonian cannibal murders =

20th-century Argentine murder case

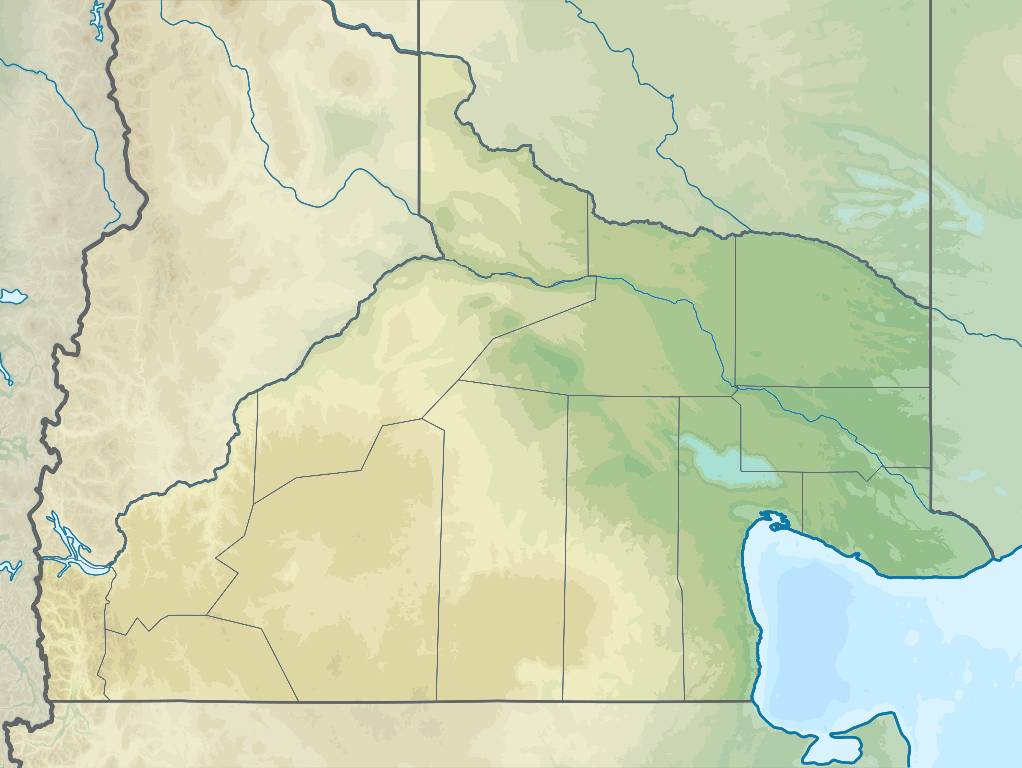
Locations

The Patagonian cannibal murders were a series of murders and unexplained disappearances that took place in rural Río Negro, Argentina, between 1904 and 1909, allegedly involving cannibalistic religious practices of the Mapuche people. The victims were mostly newly arrived immigrants from the Ottoman Empire who made a living as peddlers, and although their exact number has never been determined, estimates vary wildly from 60 to as many as 155. Over 70 suspects were arrested and charged, but the investigation was brought to a halt when their confessions were found to have been obtained through torture and deemed inadmissible. The case was never solved.

Argentine historians and modern media sometimes refer to the case as la matanza de los turcos ("the murder of the turks")

== Start of the investigation ==
The investigation began on May 1909 in El Cuy, Rio Negro, following a complaint dated April 15 by a merchant named Salomon Daud, an immigrant from the Ottoman Empire, who claimed that his brother in law, Jose Elias, and one of their employees, Ezen (both immigrants as well) had left the town of General Roca in August 1907 carrying merchandise to be sold in various small towns in Rio Negro's hinterland, and had never returned. Daud believed they had been murdered by bandits. He had good reasons to think so: in the early 1900s, Patagonia was still a sparsely populated frontier land, having just come under control of Argentina, and was rife with violence; Rio Negro's murder rate was 7,51% (murders per 10 thousand people), over 7 times higher than Buenos Aires' 0,69%. Comisario (police chief) Torino took an interest in the case and decided to lead the investigation personally.

Torino began his investigation by following the merchant’s planned route and asking people if they had seen or heard anything about the missing men. This took him to a small town called Lagunitas, where he found local shopkeepers Nazarino Contin and Jose Inda in possession of wares that, according to him, belonged to the victims, making them his first suspects. However, when questioned, the shopkeepers pointed Torino to a Mapuche community located in the nearby Sierra Negra and blamed them for killing the merchants and selling their belongings in the town; local witnesses supported their statements. By this point, Torino had become convinced that there were more victims; the witnesses from Lagunitas claimed to have recently seen at least one other merchant, an elderly man named Juan N (also of Ottoman origins) head in that direction and disappear.

Torino began to arrest and question random Mapuche men from Sierra Negra, believing the two merchants had been simply robbed and killed.

== First arrests and confessions ==
Juan Aburto, one of the first suspects to be arrested, confessed that the two men had been lured to Sierra Negra in January 1908 with offers of food and drink, taken prisoner and killed, and that their organs had been consumed in a magic ritual presided by a “machi” (Mapuche language for sorceress or witch) Aburto also claimed that nearly the entire community had been involved, and that there were dozens of victims dating back to 1904, nearly all of them lone travelers. Some of the suspects claimed that they had only participated in the killings due to pressure from their community.

The head of Jose Elias was beheaded by Francisco Muñoz [another suspect] after he cooked his legs, opened his chest and took out his heart. Then Muñoz began playing with the Arab's genitals, and finally fried his heart in the fire. [...] When the heart was ready, everyone began to eat it, and then Julian Muñoz [also a suspect] turned to them and said: "Once, when I was chief and I fought against the Christians [Europeans] we ate their hearts, but I have never tasted Turks. Now, I know their delicious taste". After eating half a heart, Julian invited his children to share the other half and said, "It is very tasty. Eat to become men, boys."
– Extract from Juan Aburto's confession, as quoted in Torino's report

Over the next few weeks, Torino would request and obtain arrest warrants for 71 men and women (out of 200 suspects) the police also found charred bones, rags, and stolen belongings, possibly backing up these confessions. The exact number of victims could not be specified, but Torino believed there were over 60. Some of the confessions pointed to Rio Negro landowners and merchants, such as a local judge named Pablo Breñavez, who was married to a Mapuche woman, and according to one of the suspects, had purchased merchandise stolen from one of the victims and so-called "virility" potions made by the machi.

The testimonies and confessions about the machi were very contradictory; some suspects claimed she was a female who disguised herself as a male, while others claimed the exact opposite. Some claimed she was a veteran of the Conquest of the Desert, having fought against Argentine forces in the 1880s. Her name was, apparently, Antonia Guanche, but most people knew her simply as "Macagua". Torino could not question her as she turned out to be a very old woman in a frail state of health.

The referred woman, who apparently was the tribe's healer and witch, could not be questioned, as it resulted impossible to do so. She was in a tent, approximately five meters from the one occupied by the concubines, completely infirm, a blood-red substance pouring from her mouth and nose, her legs covered in ulcers, perhaps due to sexually transmitted diseases. She was obviously in the final stages of tuberculosis, and it was impossible to obtain any answers from her in regards to the investigation.
– Police Chief Torino

Some sources from the time claimed that Torino was deceived and that the real machi had escaped Rio Negro with assistance from local landowners.

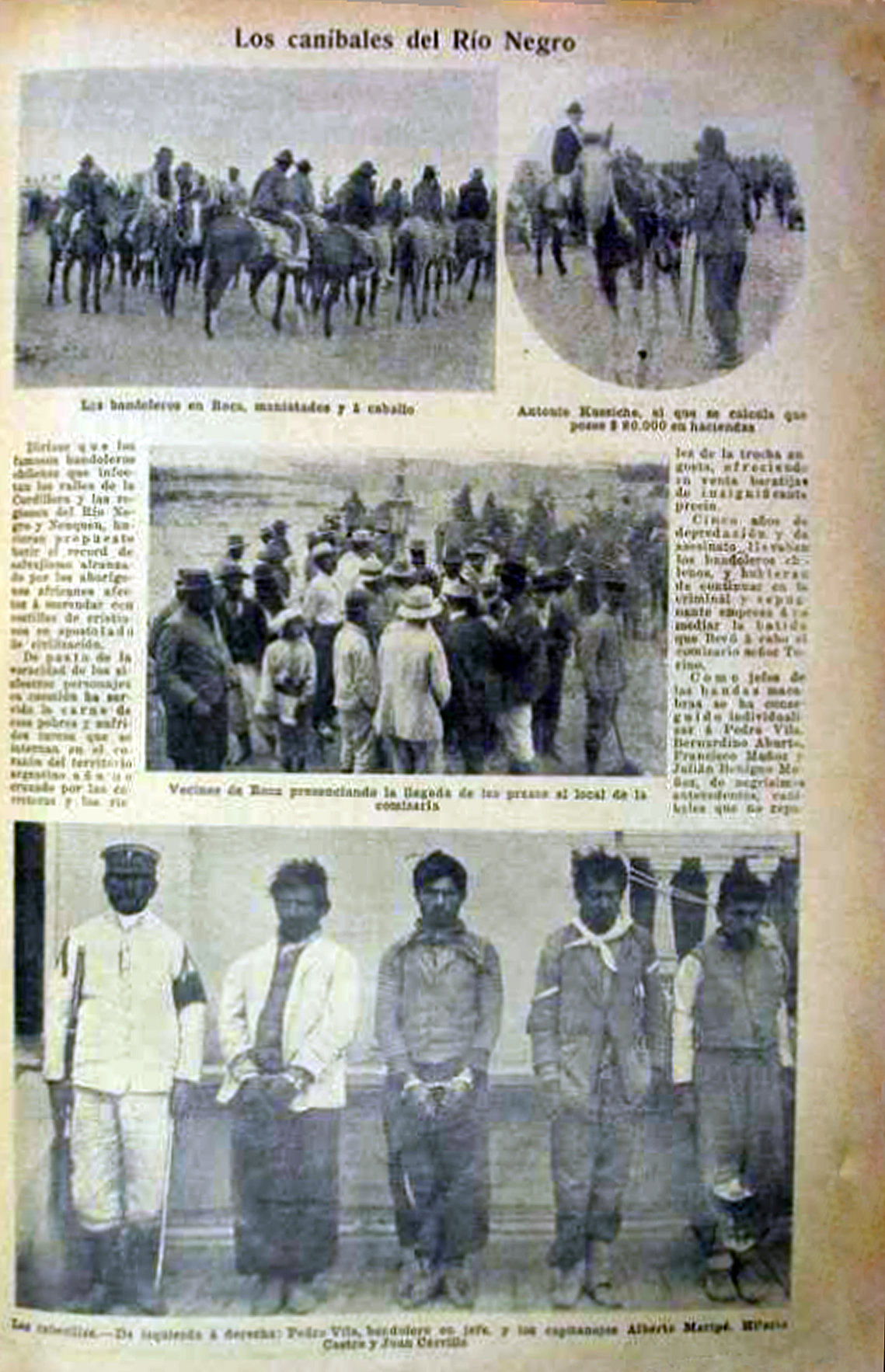
Caras y Caretas article

== Mismanagement and conclusion of the investigation ==
Torino appears to have mismanaged the case, possibly leaking details to the press trying to promote himself and advance his career. Argentine magazine “Caras y Caretas” published a 4 page long article about the murders on Feb 5 1910 titled "The cannibals of Rio Negro", containing photos of the suspects and leaked testimonies, causing a public outcry and a media frenzy. On 25 February 1910, Daud filed an additional complaint, claiming that 60 other people had disappeared in the area; one of his colleagues, named Eldahuk (Or El-Dahuk) further claimed that at least 155 members of the Ottoman community in Rio Negro had disappeared since April 1907, and asserted that the Federal Government was hiding the true number of victims so that immigrants wouldn’t be scared of settling in the region.

The Federal Prosecutor in charge of the case, Víctor Villafañe, determined that Torino had obtained his confessions using violence, making them inadmissible, and further claimed that there was not enough material evidence to prove the murders had taken place. For example, he pointed out that the charred bones had not been subjected to proper forensic and chemical analysis and could possibly belong to farm animals. He requested the release of all the suspects, but Federal Judge Torres refused under pressure from public opinion. Villafañe resigned in protest in December 1911 and was replaced by Special Prosecutor De Rege.

Following a detained examination of this process, I have become convinced there is not enough evidence for the prosecution to proceed.
– Special Prosecutor De Rege

De Rege also accused Judge Torres of ordering the destruction of valuable evidence. Torres was removed from the case in April 1912. By May 1912 all suspects still in custody had been released. Some of them had died in custody after being held in unsanitary conditions.

Torino and four of his agents were arrested and charged with various crimes in late 1910, such as abuse of authority, grave wounds, illegitimate arrests, torture and involuntary homicide. Most of the charges were dropped, and Torino was only found guilty of abuse of authority, for which he spent four years in prison. The Ottoman community raised money for a legal defense fund and gave him a hero's welcome when he was released.

== Modern opinions ==
Modern historians have cast doubts on the veracity of the testimonies obtained by the police, and believe the story might have been exaggerated by Torino himself, who sought to gain notoriety and influence. Others believe it was part of a propaganda campaign carried out by the Argentine government to vilify the indigenous people of Patagonia and legitimize their persecution.

Some historians maintain the position that the testimonies were at least partially true. It has been argued that Torino used what at the time were cutting-edge forensic tools (such as fingerprint identification) lending some credence to the investigation.

== See also ==
- Warlocks of Chiloé
- Machi (shaman)
- 1960 Valdivia earthquake#Human sacrifice
