= Percy Shaw =

English inventor of the reflective road stud (1890–1976)

Percy Shaw, OBE (15 April 1890 – 1 September 1976) was an English inventor and businessman. He patented the reflective road stud or "cat's eye" in 1934, and set up a company to manufacture his invention in 1935.

An early poster and catalogue image

== Biography ==
Percy Shaw was born in Halifax in the West Riding of Yorkshire, the fourth child and second son of James Shaw, a dyehouse labourer who worked at a local mill, and his second wife Esther Hannah Morrell. Shaw's father also had seven children by his first wife, Jane Brearley, who died in 1883. In 1892, his parents moved their large family to Boothtown in Halifax, where Shaw lived for the rest of his life.

Shaw was educated at Boothtown Board School, and started work as a labourer in a cloth mill at the age of 13. He became apprenticed to a wire drawer, but the low wages on offer were not attractive and he soon took a series of unskilled jobs in local engineering works. He was thus well placed to join his father in a new business repairing small machine tools used in munitions production during the First World War. After his father's death in 1929, he started his own small business as a road contractor, repairing roads until his death in the 1970s. He received an OBE in 1965.

== Invention ==
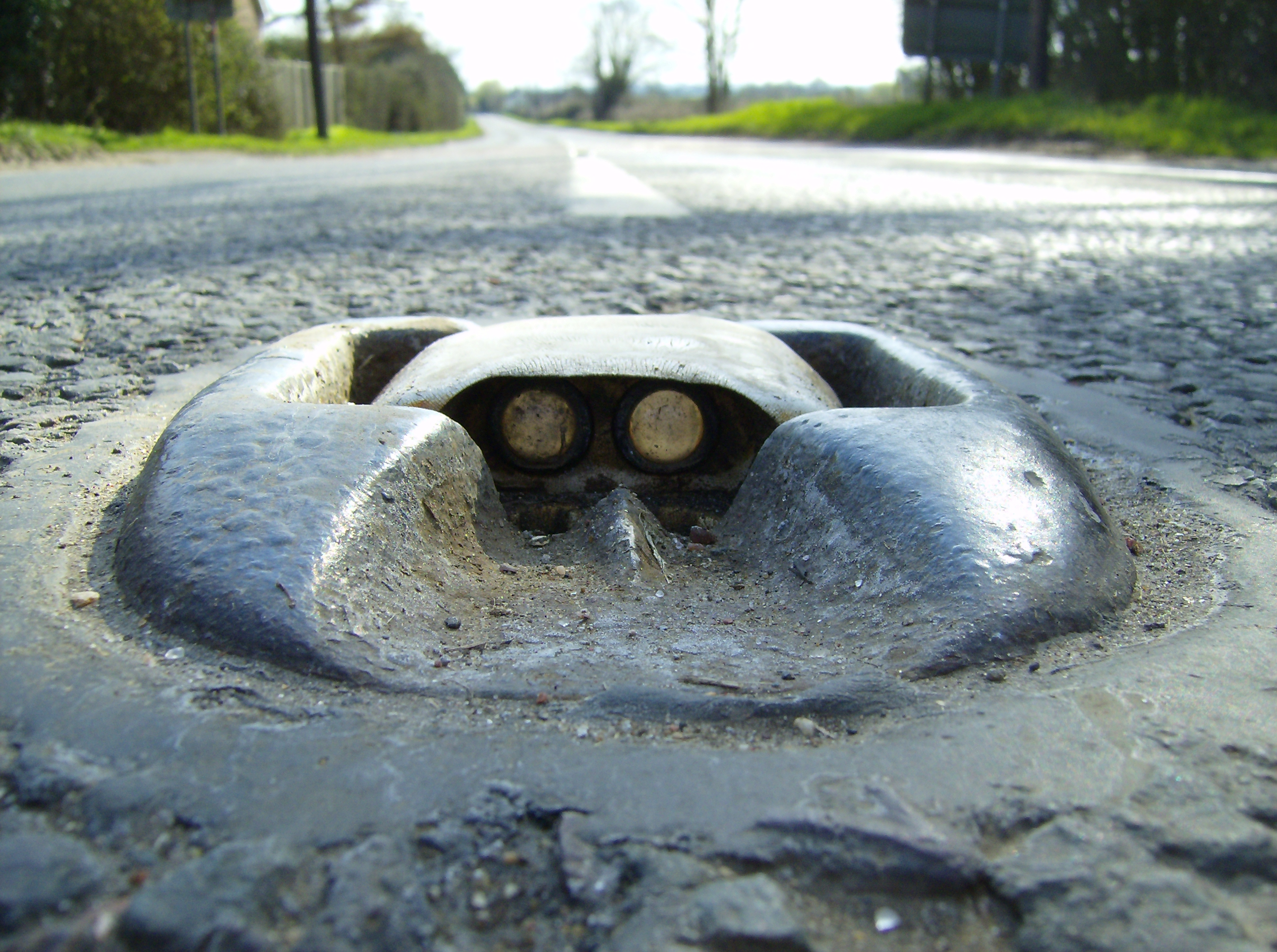
The retroreflective glass spheres shown set into a cat's eye in the United Kingdom.

Shaw was inventive, even at an early age, but his most famous invention was the cat's eye for showing the way along roads in the dark. There are several stories about how he came up with the idea. The most famous involves his driving down the difficult road (Queensbury Road, part of the A647 with a very steep drop to one side) from the Old Dolphin public house in Clayton Heights to his home in Halifax, when a cat on a fence along the edge of the road looked at the car and reflected his headlights back to him, allowing him to take corrective action and remain on the road.

In an interview with Alan Whicker, however, he told a different story of being inspired on a foggy night to think of a way of moving the reflective studs on a road sign to the road surface. Further, local schoolchildren who were taken on visits to the factory in the late 1970s were told that the idea came from Shaw seeing light reflected from his car headlamps by tram tracks in the road on a foggy night. The tram tracks were polished by the passing of trams and by following the advancing reflection, it was possible to maintain the correct position in the road.

In 1934, he patented his invention (patents Nos. 436,290 and 457,536), based on the 1927 retroreflecting lens patent of Richard Hollins Murray. A year later, Reflecting Roadstuds Ltd was formed to manufacture the devices. Sales were initially slow, but approval from the Ministry of Transport and the blackout in the Second World War gave a huge boost to production and the firm, located near Shaw's home in Boothtown, grew in size making more than a million roadstuds a year, which were exported all over the world. A later patent added a rainwater reservoir to the rubber shoe, which could be used to wash the glass "eyes" when a car drove over the stud. Such a success was the invention of the "cat's eye" that he was rewarded with an OBE for services to exports in the birthday honours list in 1965.

He became eccentric in later life, removing the carpets, curtains and much of the furniture from his isolated home, and keeping four televisions running constantly (respectively tuned to BBC1, BBC2 and ITV with a fourth showing BBC2 in colour, all with the sound turned down). On each Friday a few friends would come to the house and Percy would supply crates of bottled ale and boxes of potato crisps. He told Alan Whicker that the reason for keeping the TVs on simultaneously was so that his friends could watch whichever of the then existing channels they chose to, and there would be no arguments. His one luxury was his Rolls-Royce Phantom. He never married and he died from cancer and heart disease at Boothtown Mansion, Halifax, where he had lived for all but two of his 86 years. Despite rumours of a personal fortune, his personal estate was admitted to probate in December 1976 at a value of £193,500. He was an agnostic, but his funeral was held at Boothtown Methodist Church, and he was cremated in Elland.

In 2005, he was listed as one of the 50 greatest Yorkshire people in a book by Bernard Ingham.

== Commemoration ==
A pub in Broad Street, Halifax, is named for Shaw. A blue plaque was erected by the Halifax Civic Trust. The University of Huddersfield renamed the Queen Street Studios building 'Percy Shaw House' in honour of Shaw.
