= Reflecting Roadstuds Ltd =

- Industry: Road construction and repair
- Founded: 15 March 1935 (by Percy Shaw)
- Headquarters: 1 Mill Lane, Boothtown, Halifax, HX3 6TR, England
- Area served: UK
- Products: Cat's eyes
- Website: Reflecting Roadstuds

Reflecting Roadstuds is the main company in the UK that manufactures cat's eyes for use on roads.

== History ==
Percy Shaw, of Halifax (then in the West Riding of Yorkshire) invented the cat's eye. Reflecting Roadstuds was set up a year later in 1935. It required £500 from two company directors and established a 20-acre (81,000 m^{2}) manufacturing site with 130 workers, later making a million roadstuds a year. Initially it was difficult for the company to sell their new idea to road constructors and the government. However the onset of the blackout in the Second World War saw the idea being adopted throughout the United Kingdom. By the 1960s, its products were used on lane markings, then on the edge of carriageways from the early 1970s.

== Company structure ==
It is situated off Boothtown Road (A647) in the north of Halifax.

Roadstuds, also known as raised pavement markers, are also made by Roadcraft Safety Products of Weston-super-Mare.

== Products ==
The products conform to the 1998 British Standard BS EN 1463, which lists standards for road markings and reflective materials, and the Traffic Signs Regulations and General Directions.

It makes:

- Cat's eyes
- Pedestrian crossing studs
- Tactile paving studs
