= Cat's eye (road) =

Retroreflective safety device used in road marking

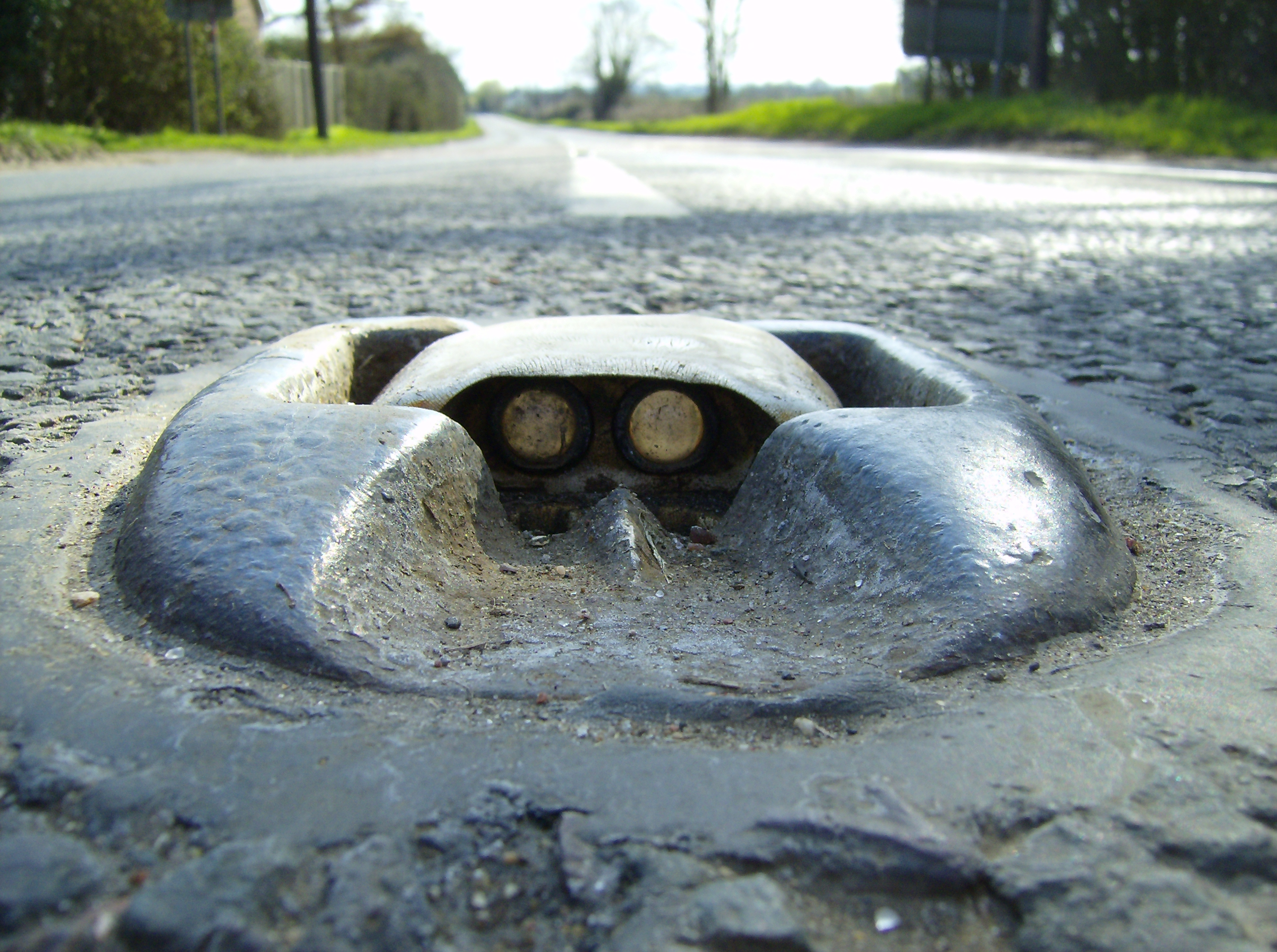
Original form cat's eye, UK

A cat's eye, or road stud, is a retroreflective safety device used in road marking and was the first of a range of raised pavement markers. The cat's eye, when illuminated by the lights of an approaching car, becomes very visible as a marker.

== Description ==
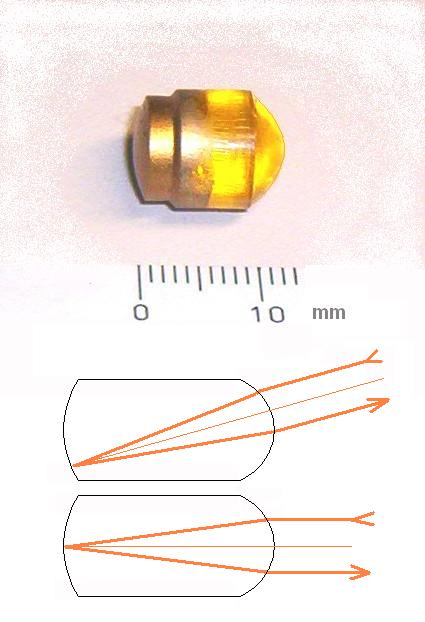
Cat's eye glass body and principle of operation. Back (left) face is mirror-coated.

The cat's eye design originated in the UK in 1934 and is today used all over the world. The original form consisted of two pairs of retroreflectors set into a white rubber dome, mounted in a cast iron housing. This is the kind that marks the centre of the road, with one pair of cat's eyes showing in each direction. A single-ended form has become widely used in other colours at road margins and as lane dividers. Cat's eyes are particularly valuable in fog and are largely resistant to damage from snow ploughs.

A key feature of the cat's eye is the flexible rubber dome which is occasionally deformed by the passage of traffic. A fixed rubber wiper cleans the surface of the reflectors as they sink below the surface of the road (the base tends to hold water after a shower of rain, making this process even more efficient). The rubber dome is protected from impact damage by metal "kerbs" – which also give tactile and audible feedback for wandering drivers.

== History ==
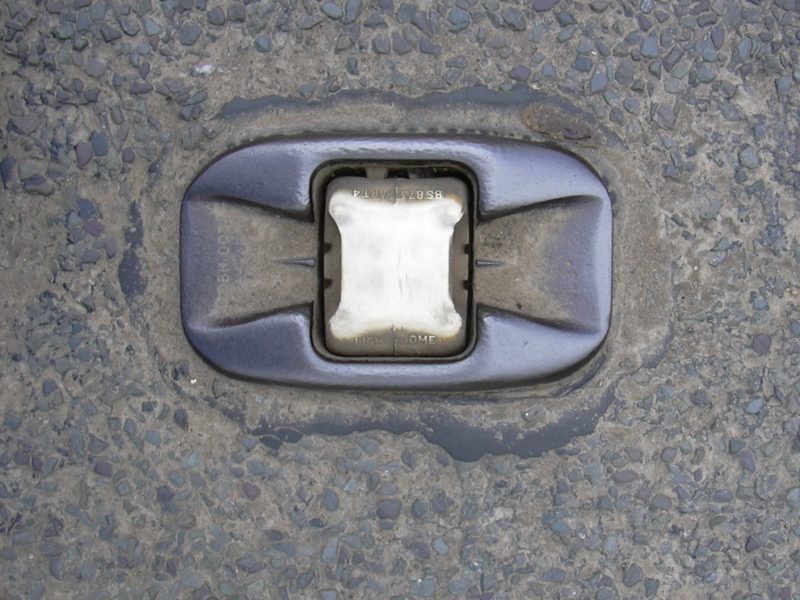
The double-ended cat's eye is Shaw's original design and marks the road centre-line.

The inventor of cat's eyes was Percy Shaw of Boothtown, Halifax, West Riding of Yorkshire, England. When the tram-lines were removed in the nearby suburb of Ambler Thorn, he realised that he had been using the polished steel rails to navigate at night. The name "cat's eye" comes from Shaw's inspiration for the device: the eyeshine reflecting from the eyes of a cat. In 1934, he patented his invention (patents Nos. 436,290 and 457,536), and on 15 March 1935, founded Reflecting Roadstuds Limited in Halifax to manufacture the items. The name Catseye is their trademark. The retroreflecting lens had been invented six years earlier for use in advertising signs by Richard Hollins Murray, an accountant from Herefordshire and, as Shaw acknowledged, they had contributed to his idea.

The blackouts of World War II (1939–1945) and the shuttered car headlights then in use demonstrated the value of Shaw's invention and helped popularise their mass use in the UK. After the war, they received firm backing from a Ministry of Transport committee led by James Callaghan and Sir Arthur Young. Eventually, their use spread all over the world.

In 2006, Cat's eyes were voted one of Britain's top 10 design icons in the Great British Design Quest organised by the BBC and the Design Museum, a list which included Concorde, Mini, Supermarine Spitfire, K2 telephone box, World Wide Web and the AEC Routemaster bus.

== Local practice ==
=== United Kingdom and Hong Kong ===
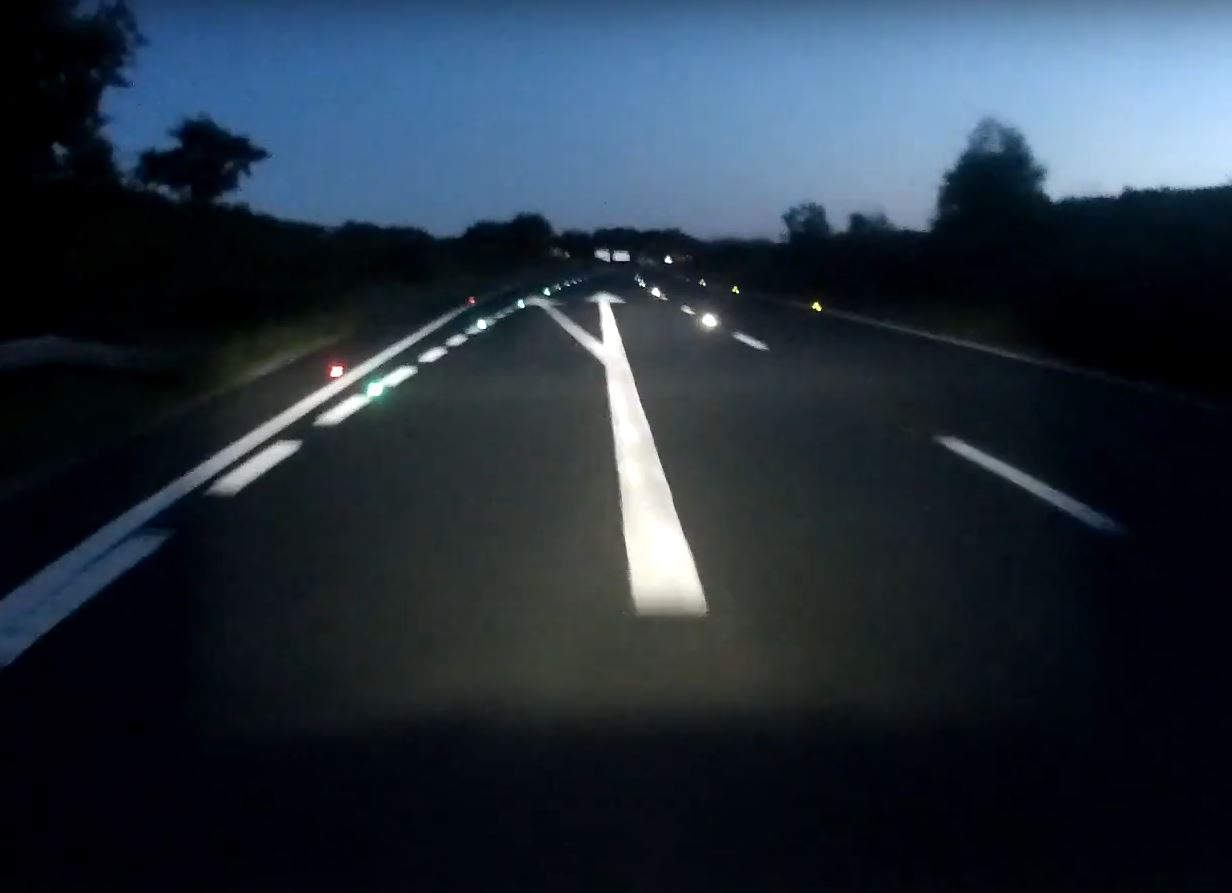
The different colours of cats eyes, at Picket Post on the A31

In the United Kingdom, different colours of cat's eyes are used to denote different situations:

- White is used to indicate the centre line of a single carriageway road or the lane markings of a dual carriageway or motorway.
- Amber and red cat's eyes denote lines that should not be crossed under normal circumstances. Amber is used for the right-hand side of dual carriageways and motorways, delineating the central reservation. Red is used for the left-hand side of the same and may be crossed in order to access a hard shoulder in emergencies.
- Green indicates a line that may be crossed, such as a slip road or lay-by.

These units are not very visible in daylight and are generally used in conjunction with traditionally painted lines. Temporary cat's eyes with just a reflective strip are often used during motorway repair work. These are typically day glow green/yellow so they are easily visible in daylight as well as in darkness; they can then be used on their own for lane division.

Also seen during motorway repair work are plastic traffic pillars that are inserted into the socket of a retractable cat's eye rather than being free-standing. These are often used in conjunction with two rows of the temporary cat's eyes to divide traffic moving in opposite directions during motorway roadworks.

Solar-powered cat's eyes known as solar road studs and showing a red or amber LED to traffic, have been introduced on roads regarded as particularly dangerous at locations throughout the world. However, shortly after one such installation in Essex in the autumn of 2006 the BBC reported that the devices, which flash at an almost imperceptibly fast rate of 100 times a second, could possibly set off epileptic fits and the Highways Agency had suspended the programme. The suspension appeared to have been lifted by 2015, when LED cat's eyes began to be installed along newly re-paved sections of the A1 and A1(M) in County Durham and Tyne and Wear.

Flashing blue LED cat's eyes were demonstrated on the TV show Accident Black Spot, aired on Channel 4 on 19 December 2000, which alert the driver to potential ice on the road when a low enough temperature, provisionally set at 3 °C (37 °F), is reached. Proposed enhancements in 2013 were to change the standard white light to amber for four seconds after the passing of a vehicle, or red if the following vehicle is too close or traffic ahead is stationary.

=== Ireland ===
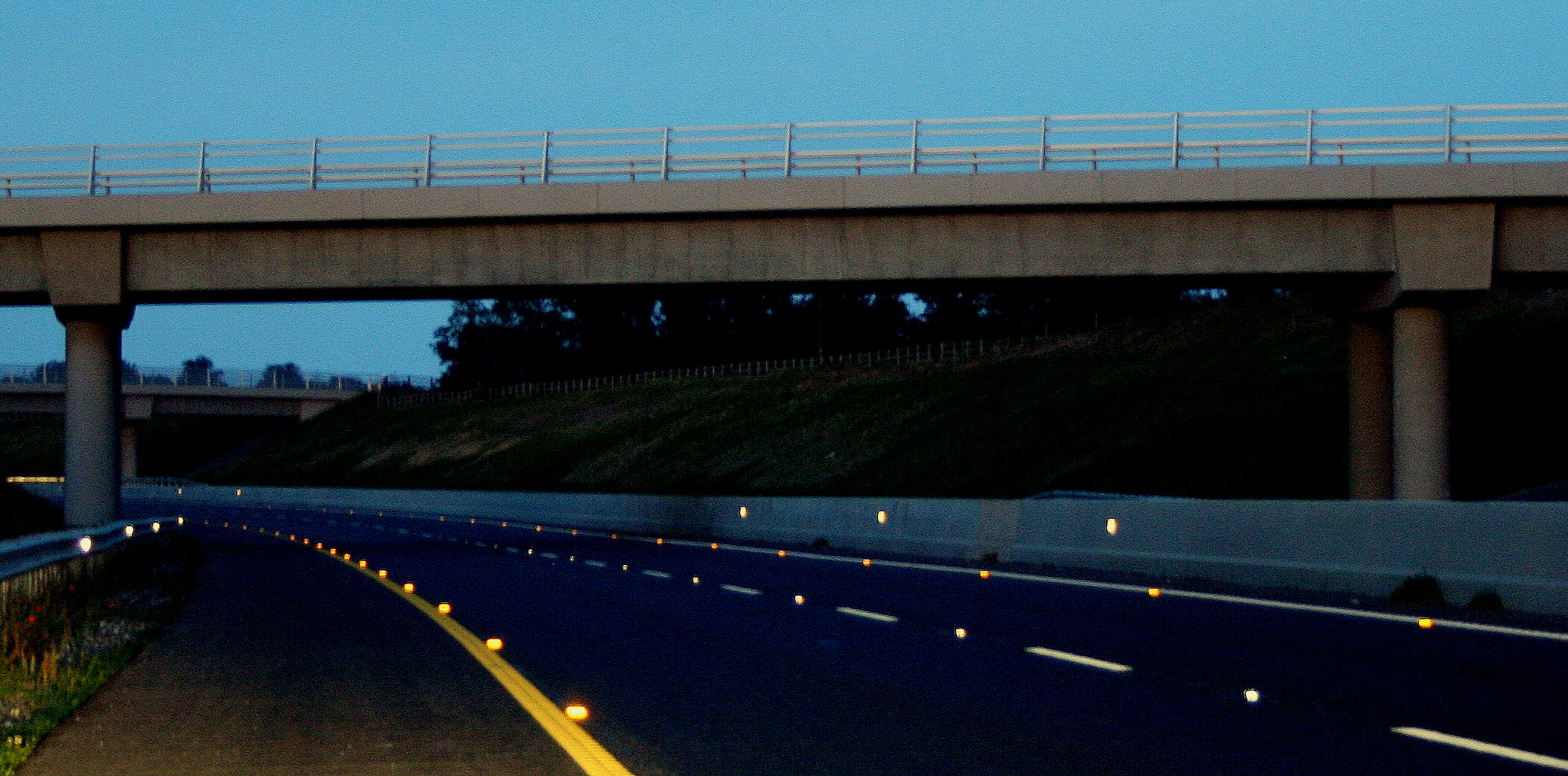
M9 motorway in Carlow, Ireland, with cat's eyes on the road surface and other retroreflectors on barriers

In Ireland yellow cat's eyes are used on all hard shoulders, including motorways (neither red nor blue cat's eyes are used). In addition, standalone reflector batons are often used on the verge of Irish roads. Green cat's eyes are used to alert motorists to upcoming junctions. There are limited installations of actively powered cats eyes, which flash white light, on particularly dangerous sections of road such as the single carriageway sections of the N11.

=== United States ===
The closest equivalent in the United States is the Stimsonite retroreflective raised pavement marker, a fixed marker without the rubber self-cleaning property. Stimsonite markers are made out of plastic, not metal, and were invented in 1963.

=== New Zealand ===
In New Zealand, roads are generally marked with white reflective cat's eyes every ten metres along the centreline, occasionally on high-volume roads; both Botts' dots and cat's eyes are used (typically there is one cat's eye followed by three Botts' dots places in every ten-metre stretch of highway). The colour pattern on New Zealand roads is white or yellow cat's eyes along the centre of the road (yellow indicating overtaking is not permitted), and in certain places red dots along the hard shoulder or left edge of a motorway. Single blue cat's eyes are used to indicate the locations of fire hydrants. In rural settings and along State Highways, these markings are augmented by retroreflective posts along the edge of the road (white reflectors on the left, yellow reflectors on the right when on a left turning bend). Bridges are similarly marked with retro-reflective markings in diagonal bands of white and black (to the left) and yellow and black (to the right).

=== Continental Europe ===
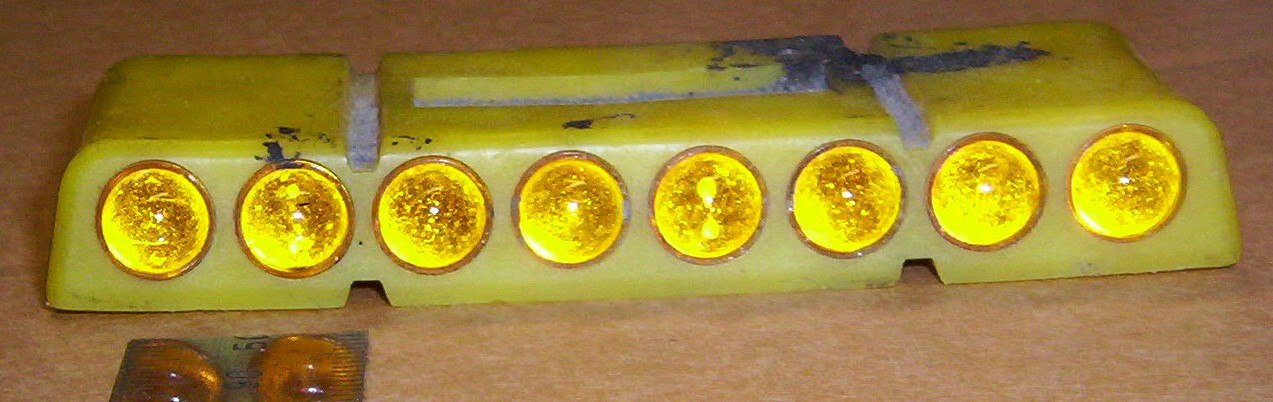
Road-mounted yellow cat's eyes mark road works (Germany).

By contrast to the UK where use of cat's eyes is widespread, in Continental Europe cat's eyes are rarely used as a permanent fixture. Most appear white or gray during daylight; the colors discussed here are the color of light they reflect. Because of their inconspicuousness during the day, they are always used in conjunction with painted retro-reflective lines.

White markers for lane markings. When used on dual carriageways, motorways, or one-way roads, they may illuminate red on the reverse, to indicate drivers are traveling the wrong way.

Yellow or amber markers are used next to the central reservation (US: median) on motorways and dual carriageways and, in the Republic of Ireland, also on hard shoulders.

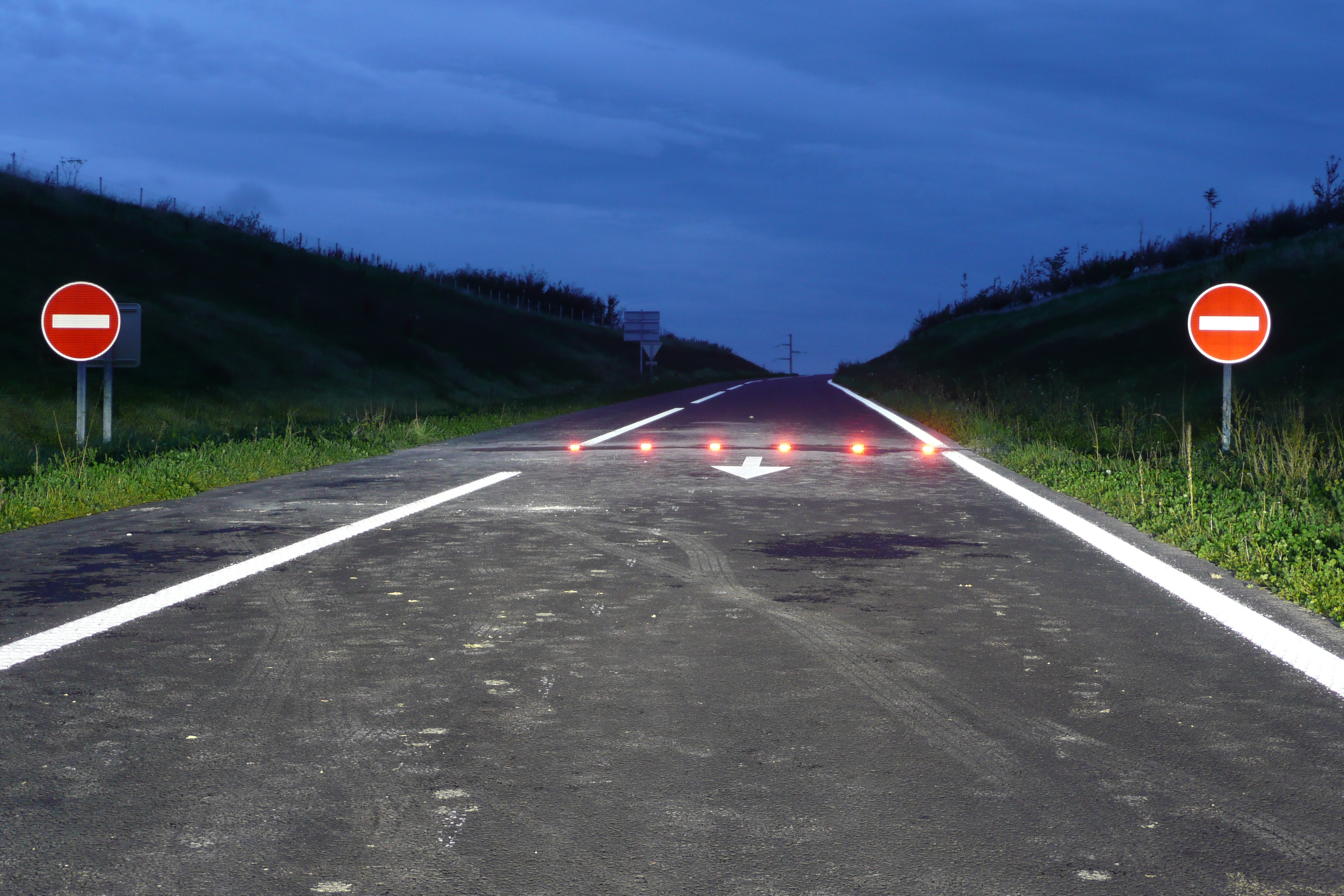
Red cat's eyes used to prevent counterflow drivers from entering on the wrong carriageway in France

Red markers are used by the hard shoulder on motorways and at the edge of the running surface on other roads. They are also occasionally used to indicate a no-entry road and when traveling down the wrong way of the motorway/dual carriageway.

Green markers are used where slip-roads leave and join the main carriageway on dual carriageways. In some countries, they are also used across the entrances of minor roads or accesses onto major single carriageway roads or lay-bys.

Blue markers are used to indicate the entrance to police reserved slip-roads (these do not lead anywhere, they are to allow police to park and monitor motorway traffic).

The exception to the above rules are:

Fluorescent yellow markers are used to indicate temporary lanes during roadworks on major roads and are glued to the road surface; they are never embedded in it. Any painted markings will be removed from the road surface if they contradict the markers. They are fluorescent yellow in colour, so they stand out in the day, but reflect white light at night. Where used, they are much more numerous and dense than standards markers, as they are not used in conjunction with painted lines. They also appear yellow on the edges but reflect red on the left side or amber on the right

=== Lebanon ===
In Lebanon, cat's eyes are widely used on most freeways, highways and roadways. On freeways and highways, every one (or sometimes two) white stripes separating lanes is followed by a white shining cat's eye. On the edge of the road next to the median strip, a yellow cat's eye is placed every 10 metres (33 ft). On the road shoulders a red shining cat's eye is placed every 10 metres (33 ft). On roadways separated by double yellow lines, a yellow cat's eye is placed inside the double yellow lines every 10 metres (33 ft). Before speed bumps, a series of cat's eyes are placed shining white to the oncoming traffic and red to the car from the opposite direction. On pedestrian crossings, blue shining cat's eyes are placed after every zebra line. On roads with traffic lights, a series of red shining cat's eyes are placed 50 metres (160 ft) before traffic lights to make drivers slow down.

== Accidents caused ==
In the 1957 Mille Miglia road race, while driving along a straight road at 150 mph (240 km/h) at the village of Guidizzolo in Italy, a blowout of the left front tyre on the Ferrari 335 S driven by Alfonso de Portago caused the car to violently flip over and fly out of control, killing him, his navigator and nine spectators, including children. Enzo Ferrari was prosecuted for 11 counts of manslaughter, but was acquitted in 1961 after a panel of automobile engineers told the court that the blowout was probably caused by the car striking a cat's eye. In the 2023 film Ferrari a damaged metal cat's eye cutting the tyre is blamed for the fatal accident, consistent with the Italian judiciary's official findings.

On the morning of 25 April 1999 on the M3 motorway in Hampshire, England, a van dislodged the steel body of a cat's eye which flew through the windscreen of a following car and hit electronic musician Kemistry, who was a passenger, in the face, killing her instantly. The coroner recorded a verdict of accidental death. Investigators acknowledged that the cat's eye bodies occasionally came loose, but added that such an accident was previously unheard of. A question was asked in the House of Lords about the safety of cat's eyes in light of the incident, and the Highways Agency conducted an investigation into the "long-term integrity and performance" of various types of road stud.
