= Utility location =

Process of identifying and labeling public utility mains that are underground

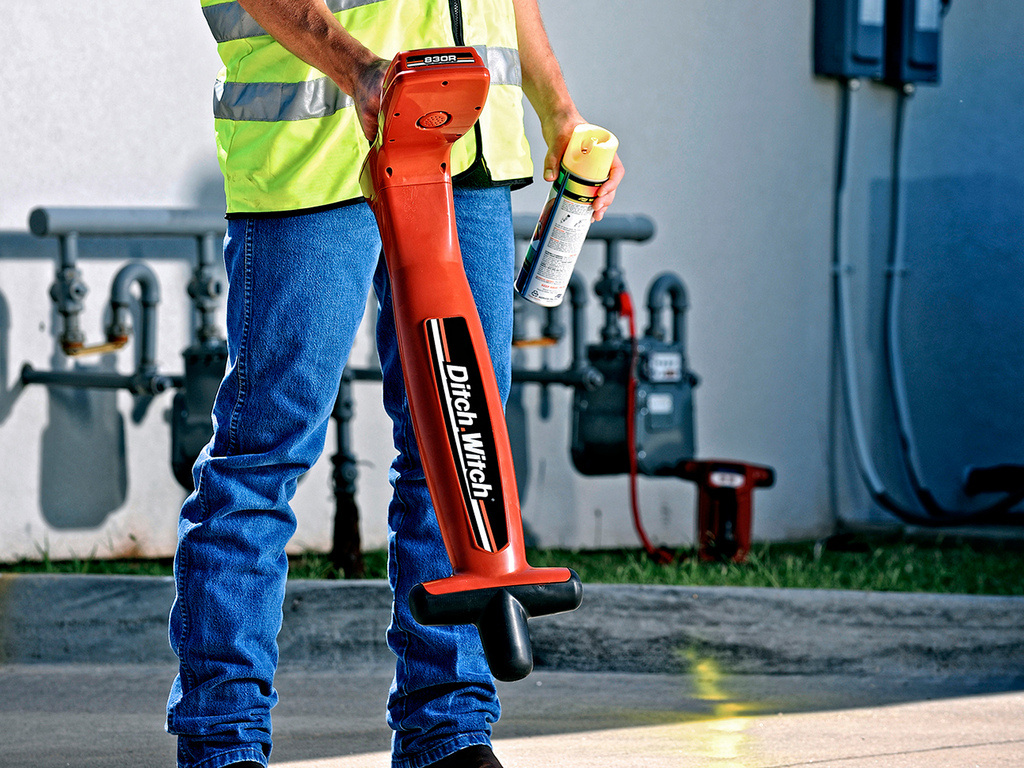
Utility locator tool in use with spray marking can for marking location

Utility locating is the process of identifying and labeling public utility mains that are underground. These mains may include lines for telecommunication, electricity distribution, natural gas, cable television, fiber optics, traffic lights, street lights, storm drains, water mains, and wastewater pipes. In some locations, major oil and gas pipelines, national defense communication lines, mass transit, rail, and road tunnels also compete for space underground.

== Overview ==
Public utility systems are often run underground—some by the very nature of their function, others for convenience or aesthetics. In the United States, it is estimated that subsurface lines amount to over 20,000,000 miles (32,000,000 km) in total. Before digging, local governments often require that the underground systems' locations be denoted and approved, if it is to be in the public right-of-way.

Pipeline markers, signs, or other indicators may or not be visible to warn of the presence of underground utilities. For various reasons, including security, the precise location of the utilities may not be indicated. The only way an excavator can know the precise location, number, and types of utilities is to contact the underground utilities coordinator, and request that the locations be marked. In most jurisdictions, there is no charge for this service, but advance notification is a legal requirement.

In the UK, to follow HSG47 and PAS128 guidelines, it is recommended that a Desktop Utility Search is carried out. A Utility Search, also known as a C2 Utility Search or PAS128 (D) utility search, is the initial step in identifying utility asset owners and locating their buried and overhead assets and apparatus. A Utility Search is essential for development projects as it provides valuable insight into the presence and location of underground and overhead utility assets. As well as providing an understanding of the networks within the vicinity of a site, this information can help to prevent accidents, disruptions, and costly delays during construction.

== Technology and equipment ==
Because of the many different types of materials that go into manufacturing each of the different types of underground lines, different detection and location methods must be used. The two general methods are called passive locating and active locating.

Passive locating uses signals that occur naturally on some utility lines. This method often fails to locate 60% or so of utility lines, and misidentifying utilities is an associated risk. Active locating, on the other hand, is more accurate. It makes use of signals that the locators generate through a transmitter. Then, with the help of a receiver, locators can trace as well as identify what type of utility line lies underground.

The active method is the most suitable for locating conductive metal pipes and cables. This process often involves using a piece of electromagnetic equipment, consisting of a transmitter and a receiver. For other types of pipe such as plastic or concrete, a metallic tracer wire or conductive foil (detectable tape) may be buried alongside or immediately above the pipe, to aid in locating it. In the absence of such a conductive tracer, other types of radiolocation or modern ground-penetrating radar must be used. Location by these technical means is necessary because maps often lack the pinpoint precision needed to ensure proper clearance. In older cities, it is especially a problem since maps may be very inaccurate, or may be missing entirely.

A few utilities are permanently marked with short posts or bollards, mainly for lines carrying petroleum products. This may be done because of venting requirements, and also serves to indicate the location of underground facilities that are especially hazardous if disturbed.

As of 2022, utility locators depend primarily on three types of utility locating equipment to do their job, including ground-penetrating radar, electromagnetic profiling locators, and radio frequency pipe locators. These tools are produced by a number of manufacturers, and are widely available throughout the world. Some of the large manufacturers include Leica, RIDGID, and Schonstedt. With advances in technology, these tools continue to improve, and locators in the field are able to be more accurate.

Many utilities are now mapped out on GIS mapping services like ESRI, which improves both accuracy and process transparency. Some of the current locate wands are able to relay their information and sync up with GIS systems to expand and correct the information on the map, which helps to update the map very rapidly.

== Organizations ==
In the US, Canada, Australia, and New Zealand, many large locate companies handle millions of tickets every dig season, and need a way of managing these tickets and sending them through to a unified call center (for example, Underground Service Alert).

The Common Ground Alliance (CGA) publishes the Damage Information Reporting Tool (DIRT report) every year, which gives a fuller picture of the effects of utility locating throughout North America. In recent years, DIRT has demonstrated a trend of greater excavation damage incidents over time. This report does not contain every single incident, as stakeholders voluntarily submit underground damages and near-miss reports, but it is the most complete repository of utility damages anywhere in the world. Utility Locators and other stakeholders depend on data like this to learn about risks and to justify continued investment in the industry.

Industry leaders in damage prevention like the Common Ground Alliance and IR-Saving Lives are the biggest promoters of utility locating, and encourage other stakeholders to take utility locating seriously. The CGA also has published a paper called "Insights into Improving the Delivery of Accurate, On-Time Locates", which has expert information on how to improve the locating industry in the US and Canada (not to be confused with the Canadian Common Ground Alliance (CCGA), a companion organization to CGA in Canada).

Other technologies and equipment are identified in Technology Reports by CGA and in a major study by the Pipeline and Hazardous Materials Safety Administration in 2017 entitled A Study on Improving Damage Prevention Technology.

== Telephone hotlines ==
"Call before you dig", "Know What's Below! Dig With Confidence!", "Dial before you dig", "Digger's Hotline", "One-call", "Miss Utility", "Dig Safe", "Click before you dig", or Underground Service Alert are services that allow construction workers or property owners to contact utility companies, who will then denote where underground utilities are located via color-coded markings typically up to and not past the user's service connection or meter. Utility lines on the other side of the meter or service connection are considered to be part of the customer's property, and will typically not be located by these services.

Failure to call such a number ahead of time may result in a fine or even a criminal charge against a person or company, particularly if such negligence causes a major utility outage or serious accident, or an evacuation due to a gas leak. Hitting a water main may also trigger local flooding or require a boil-water advisory.

The following is a partial list of countries with one-call services for utility location:

- Australia: Australia has a National online website for lodgement of enquiries (https://www.byda.com.au). The national hotline, 1100, has now been converted to a support line to assist with online lodgement.
- Canada: In Canada, there is no unified number for the country. However, it has the "Click Before You Dig" website that provides access to the hotline for each of the provinces.
- New Zealand: Each utility is responsible for marking its own services. A private company (https://www.beforeudig.co.nz/) has been contracted by many utilities and city councils to provide one-call services and corridor access requests. A person planning to dig in the public roadway can lodge a ticket with BeforeUDig and have the utilities in the area notified who in turn will respond with maps of their assets.
- United Kingdom: In Scotland there is an online web based service called Vault (short for Scottish Community Apparatus Data Vault), which allows registered users to specify a polygon on a map and immediately obtain an interactive map of all major undertakers owning underground assets, except the principal telecoms operators. In the rest of the UK, there is no dial-before-you-dig service. Instead the onus is on excavators to ensure that they do not damage buried services. This has resulted in a class of locating tools which are simpler to use, and are called Cable Avoidance Tools (CATs), and the associated signal detectors are called Gennys.
- United States: As required by law and assigned by the US Federal Communications Commission (FCC), the 8-1-1 telephone number is used for this purpose across the United States. Most regions will have a website reporting system where a written report of where a request to mark underground lines may be made.

== Color-coding ==
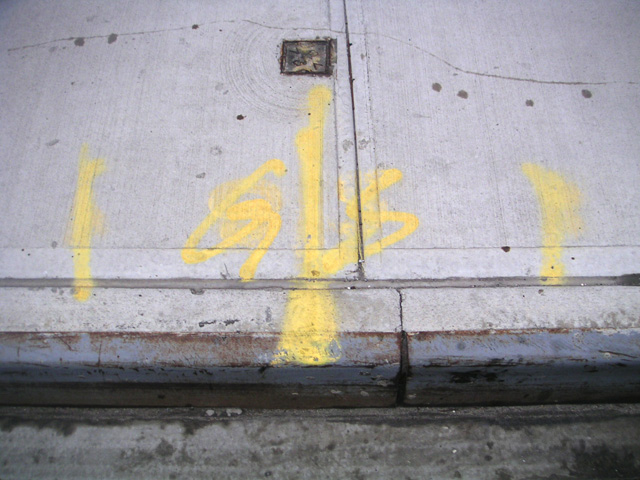
Yellow spray paint indicating below-street gas utility line (New York City, 2007)

Telecommunication cable location marking

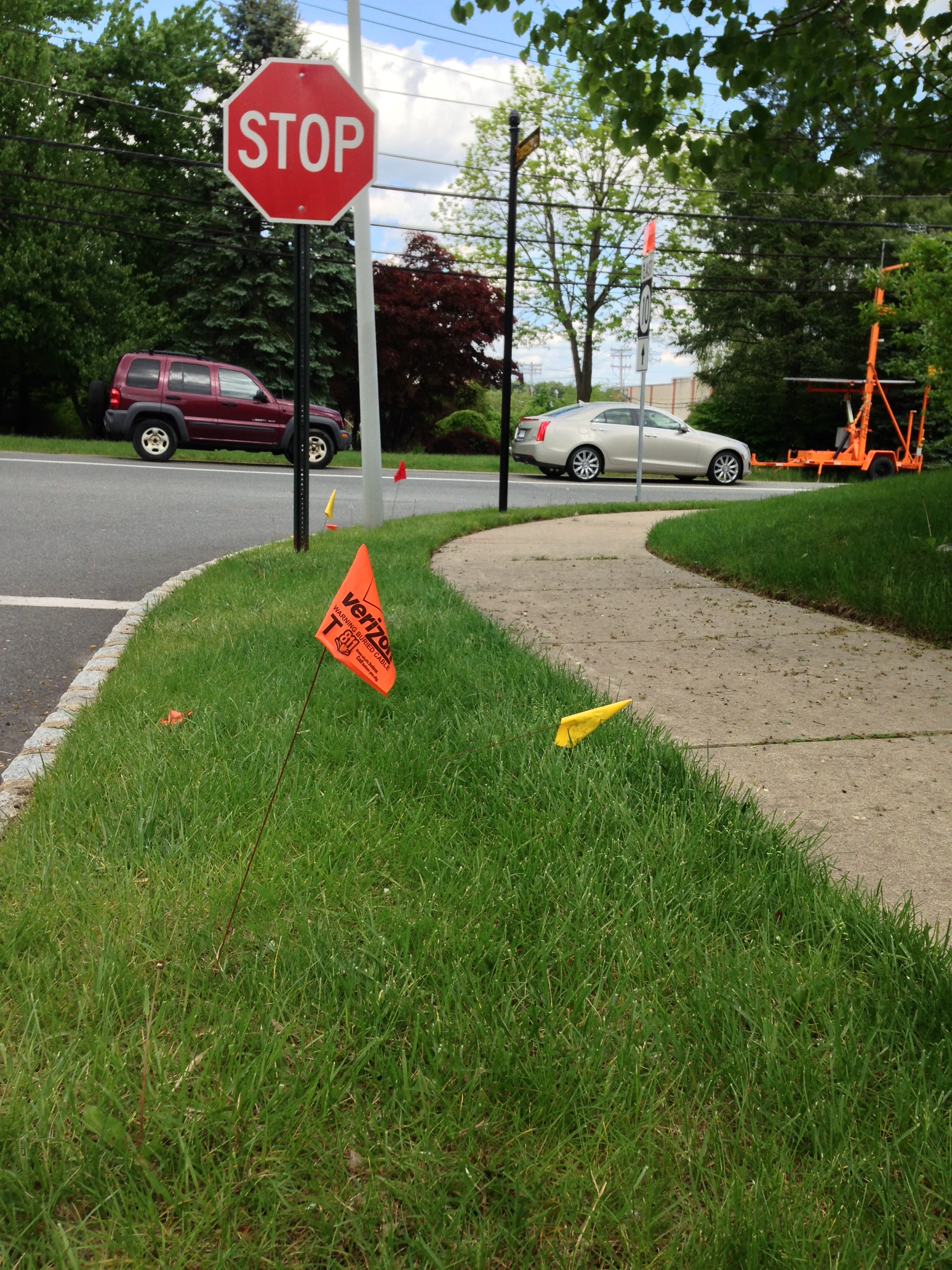
Colored flags for utility locating

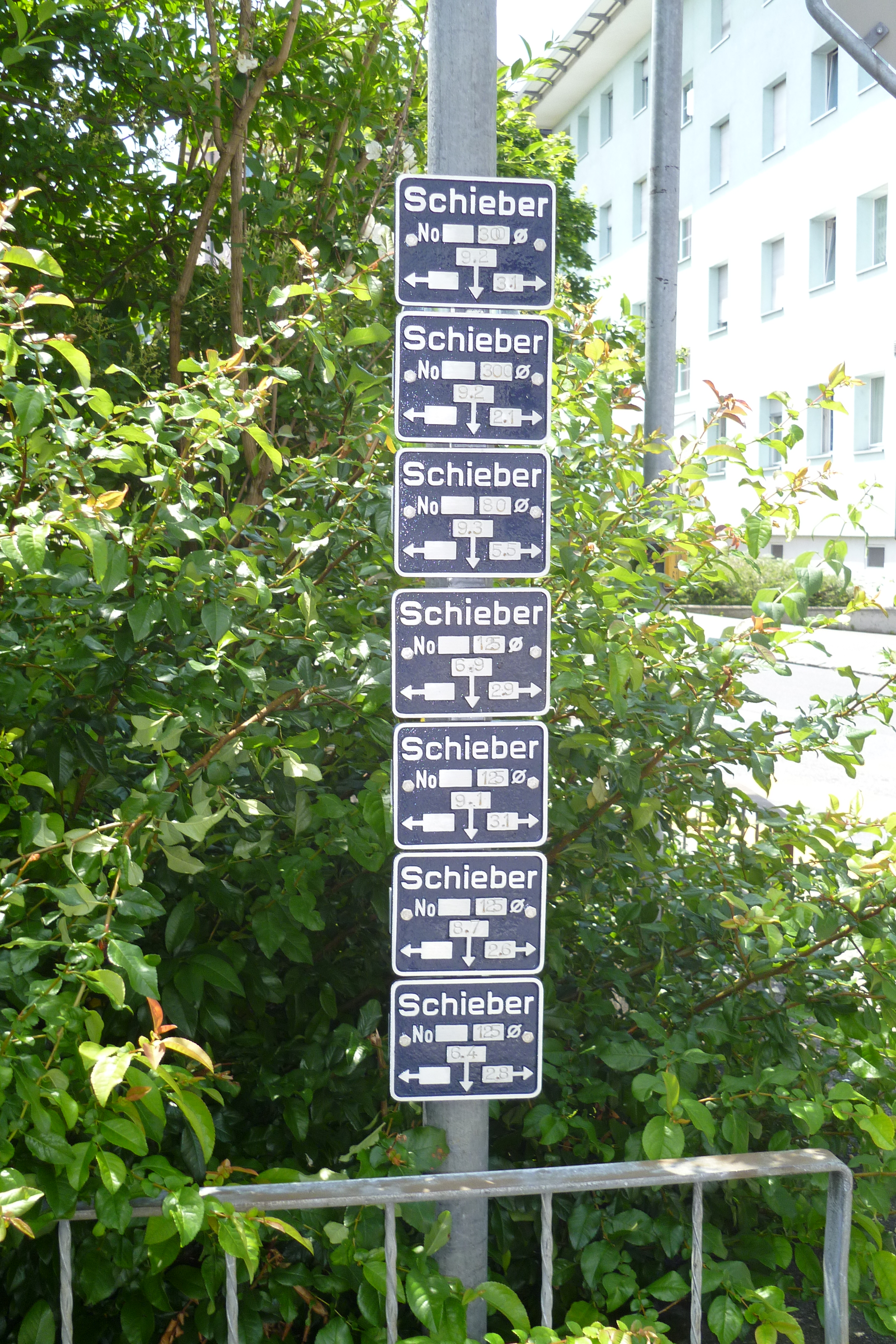
Permanent water pipeline markers in Switzerland

Utility color codes are used to identify existing underground utilities in construction areas, to protect them from damage during excavation. Colored lines, flags, or both are used to mark the location and denote the type of underground utility. A special type of spray paint dispenser, which works when the can is upside-down, is used to mark lines, often in a fluorescent color. On flags, a logo often identifies the company or municipal utility which the lines belong to.

Flags may also be an advertisement for a company which has installed an irrigation system for lawns or gardens. In this case, each sprinkler head is usually marked, so that landscaping crews will not cover or bury them with soil or sod, or damage them with tractors or other construction equipment while digging holes for trees, shrubs, or other large plants or fenceposts. This is also important because a vehicle (tractor, truck, or otherwise) can break a sprinkler or the hard-PVC pipe or joint it is mounted on, simply by driving over it, particularly on newly moved soil which is uncompacted and therefore unsupportive of such weight.

=== Australia ===
The national standard for Australia uses the following color guide:

Orange	Electricity
Yellow	Gas
Blue	Water
White	Communications
Red	Fire services
Cream	Sewerage
Purple	Reclaimed water
Silver/Gray	Steam
Brown	Oils, flammable liquids
Light blue	Air
Pink	Unidentified services
Black	Other liquids

=== Germany ===
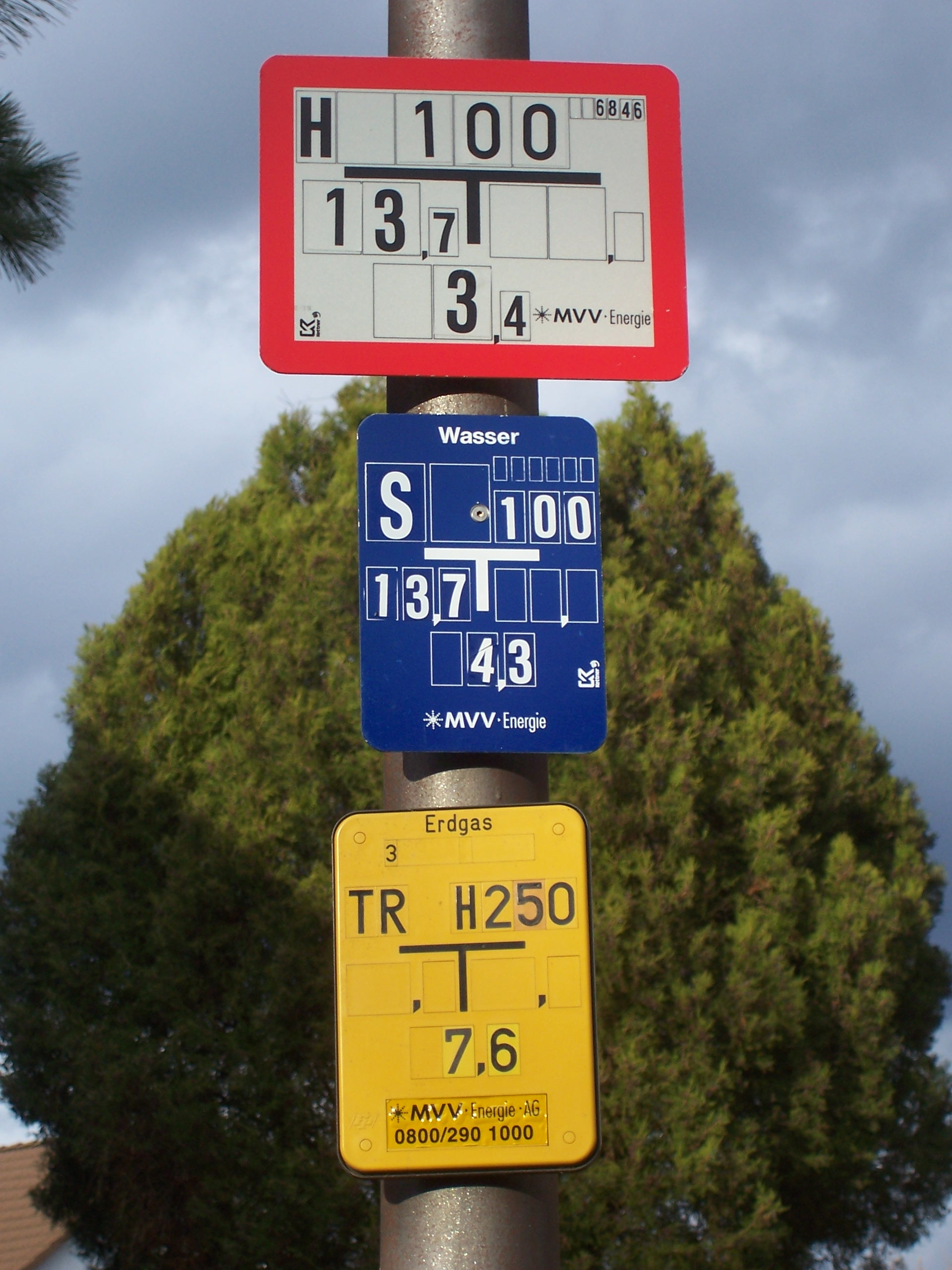
Utility location markers for a fire hydrant, a drinking water line, and a natural gas line in Germany

In Germany, the colors used for temporary marking of underground utilities are not standardized like in other countries. However, permanent marker signs are used for utilities like hydrants, drinking water lines and natural gas lines. A permanent marking of cables and sewage lines is not usual if they run in the public right-of-way. The standard for permanent markers in Germany uses the following colors:

White with red frame	Fire services (hydrants, suction points, etc.)
Blue	Drinking water
Yellow	Gas
Green	Sewage and drain lines
Orange or	Hot water/steam lines for district heating
Red	Hot water/steam lines for district heating
White or	High-voltage power lines and telecommunication cables
Grey	High-voltage power lines and telecommunication cables
Brown	Lines for oil and other flammable liquids

=== India ===
India uses a convention similar to the US, for marking underground utilities such as telephone, gas, water and electricity. The system is based entirely on convention without any written standard. These markings are color-coded, and are painted by contractors onto the pavement.

The main colors based on the convention are used in the same way as in the US: red for electricity, yellow for gas, and blue for water. However, other colors have other meanings. Green is used for telecommunication conduits. White is used as general communication between contractors; white is also used to note the details of road surface markings so that markings can be easily restored after the road construction is completed; a few telecommunication companies also use white color for their utility locations. Orange and other colors are used by local authorities to mark improvements and other details not related to utility locations.

=== New Zealand ===
There are no legal color code requirements for buried utilities and surface markings, however a general convention is used and encouraged by the government health and safety department - Worksafe.

Underground Duct	Surface Marking Color	Surface Marking Letter	Utility
Orange		E	Electricity
Yellow		G	Gas
Blue	Blue	W	Water
White	Blue	W	Water
Green	Purple	T	Telecommunications, commonly used by Chorus for copper and fiber optic cables.
Light Grey	Red	SS	Waste Water / Sewer
Dark Grey	Pink	SW	Storm Water / Drainage
Red			Regional Utility Specific, commonly used by UFF for fiber optic cables.
Purple			Regional Utility Specific, known to be used by Telstra Saturn Cable Television
Light blue			Regional Utility Specific, known to be used by Telstra Clear
Pink			Regional Utility Specific
Black			Most commonly used for non-potable water on farms however can be an outer duct for roadside utilities. Worksafe encourages the use of a 5mm wide or larger colored stripe to indicate the content of the black duct using one of the color codes above. A plain black microduct or 2-pair telephone cable is often used by Chorus for premises drop cables.

=== United Kingdom ===
The national standard for the United Kingdom uses the following color guide:

Red	Electric power lines, conduit, cables
Orange	Telecommunication, alarm and signal lines
Yellow	Gas, oil, steam, petroleum, other flammable material
Green	Sewage and drain lines
Blue	Drinking water
Purple	Reclaimed water, irrigation, slurry lines
Pink	Temporary survey markings, unknown/unidentified facilities
White	Proposed excavation limits or route

=== United States and Canada ===
Utility markings

Canada and the United States use the American Public Works Association (APWA) Uniform Color Codes for temporary marking of underground utilities:

Red; PMS 1795	Electric power lines, cables, conduit, lighting cables
Orange; PMS 144	Telecommunication, alarm or signal lines, cables, conduit, phone, cable TV, fiber optic
Yellow; PMS 108	Natural gas, oil, steam, petroleum
Green; PMS 3415	Sewer, drainage
Blue	Drinking water
Purple; PMS 253	Reclaimed water
Pink; PMS 219	Temporary survey markings, unknown or unidentified facilities
White	Proposed excavation limits or route

Some municipalities use pink paint to make lines and codes on the pavements related to required street improvements such as ramp replacement, asphalt grinding, and form injection. These markings are not directly related to utility location.

== See also ==
- Subsurface utility engineering
- Underground Service Alert
- Utility tunnel – an alternative method of routing underground utility lines and services
- Cable locator – an instrument used for detecting the presence and approximate location of buried services
- Utility repair tag – a color-coded tag to identify pavement restorer that sometime has a secondary purpose for utility location
