= Genfare =

American fare collection company

- Formerly: General Fare Industries (1980–1990); GFI Genfare (1990–2012); SPX Genfare (2012–2016)
- Type: Subsidiary
- Industry: Automated fare collection
- Founded: 1980
- Headquarters: Elk Grove Village, Illinois, United States
- Parent: General Signal (1980–1998); SPX Corporation (1998–present)
- Website: genfare.com

Genfare is an American manufacturer of fareboxes, ticket vending machines, and other fare collection equipment for public transit systems. Based in Elk Grove, Illinois, Genfare is a wholly owned subsidiary of SPX Corporation. The company claims to be the largest U.S. manufacturer of fareboxes.

== History ==
Genfare's origins can be traced to Johnson Farebox, whose founder, Tom L. Johnson, invented the first transit farebox in 1880. Johnson later acquired Cleveland Farebox, and was itself acquired by Keene Corporation in 1960.

General Fare Industries (GFI) was established by General Signal in 1980. GFI merged with Keene in 1981, and acquired the farebox business of Duncan Industries in 1983. In 1990, the company was renamed GFI Genfare.

In 1998, General Signal was purchased by SPX Corporation, and GFI Genfare became a subsidiary of SPX. The company took on its parent's name in 2012, becoming known as SPX Genfare, but was later rebranded simply as Genfare in 2016.

== Products ==
=== Fareboxes ===
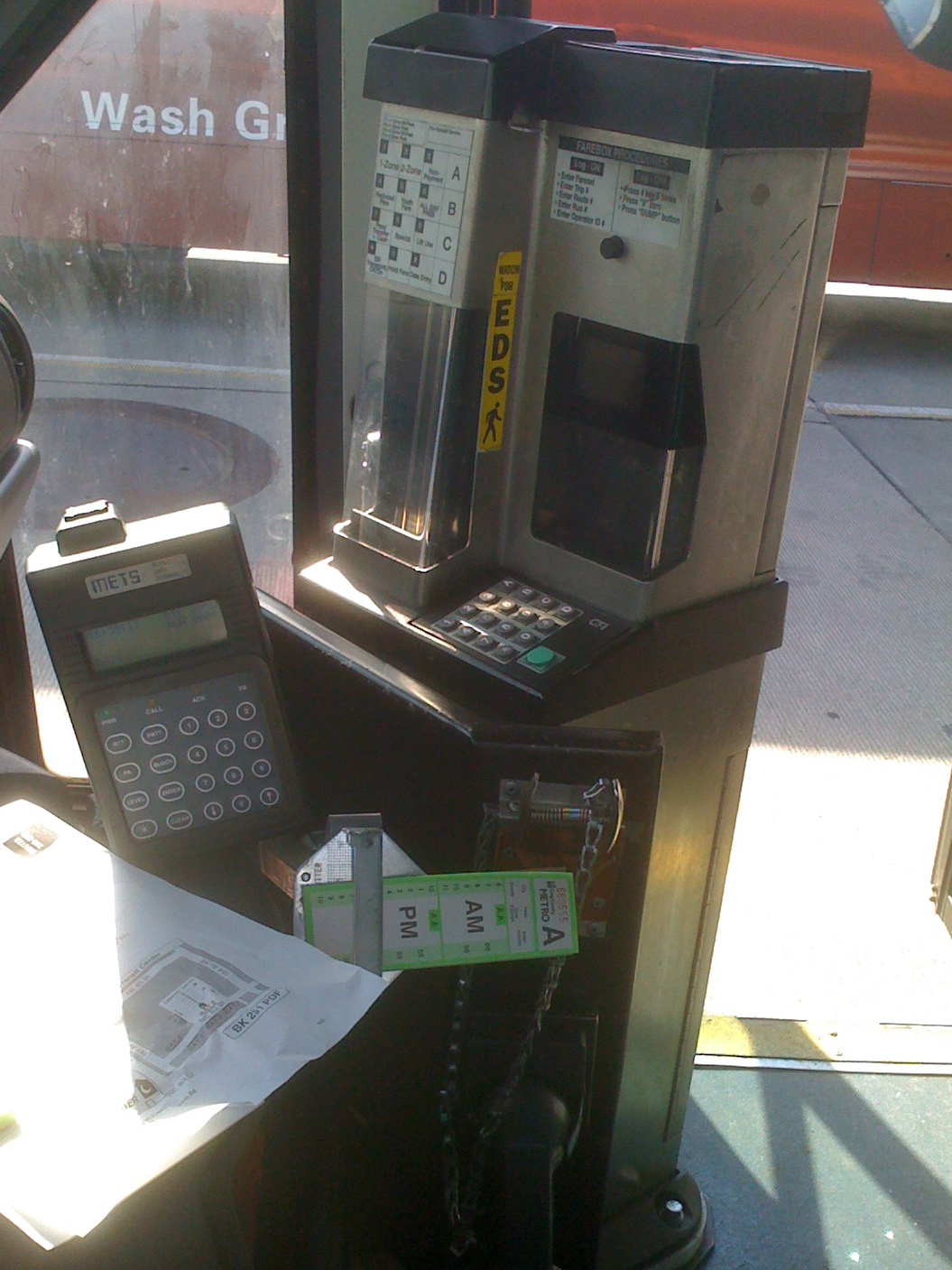
Genfare CENTSaBILL registering farebox

Genfare's primary products are fareboxes used on buses and trams. Its fareboxes range from simple mechanical cash collection boxes to complex validating fareboxes capable of printing tickets or reading smartcards.

The newer Odyssey (produced from 1997 until 2022) is capable of reading smartcards and printing magnetic-stripe tickets, while the current Fast Fare farebox (introduced in 2013) added support for credit cards and QR code-based mobile ticketing.

=== Ticket vending machines ===
Genfare produces the Vendstar series of ticket vending machines.

=== Fare gates ===
Genfare manufactured turnstiles for rapid transit systems from the 1980s until the mid-2000s. The Genfare Transentry turnstile and Easientry accessible swing gate are currently in use on Cleveland's RTA and the Detroit People Mover, and were previously used on the Chicago 'L', MARTA, and SEPTA's rapid transit lines. Genfare again began producing fare gates in 2024, after winning a contract to supply them to Miami-Dade Transit.
