= Detectable tape =

Buried utility safety device

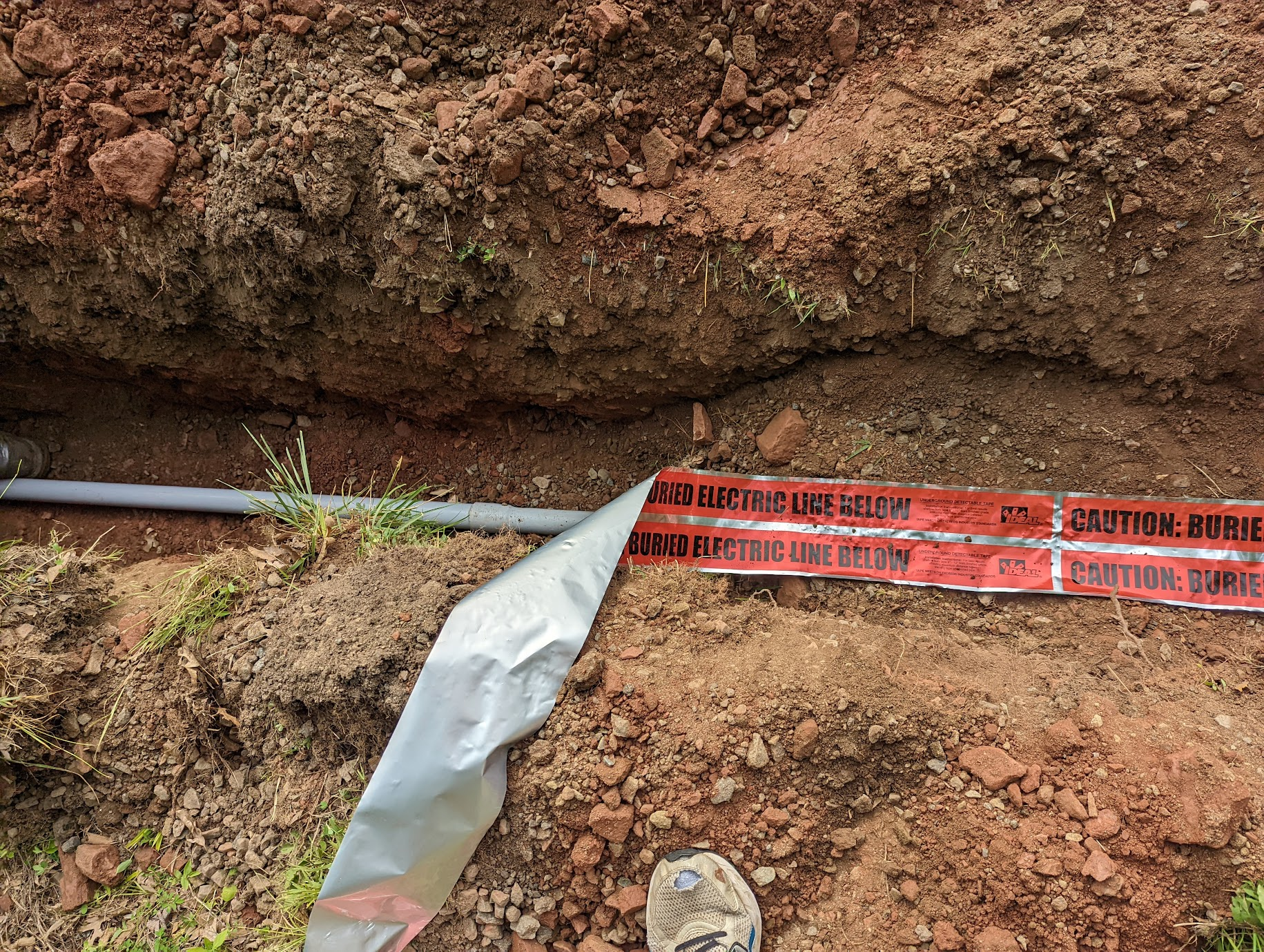
Detectable tape, here used to mark the location of a plastic pipe containing electrical wires.

Detectable tape or Underground warning tape is a conductive tape typically applied over buried utilities made of non-conductive materials such as plastic, fiberglass, or cement. It is used because most utility location methods work best on conductive objects, and hence may easily miss structures made of non-conductive materials.

The tape also serves as a physical warning. If uncovered during digging, it alerts the user to an underground object that might be damaged by further excavation. To aid in this, it is typically colored to reflect the nature of the buried object that it is protecting.

It is common for construction specifications to mandate the use of such tape.

The conductive material in detectable tapes is typically aluminium, but there have been studies investigating replacing this with a material which is both magnetic and conductive, to make it detectable to a wider variety of utility location techniques.

== See also ==
- Underground Service Alert, an organization that specializes in marking underground utilities.
