= MGC =

MGC can refer to:

- Machine Gun Corps
- Malvern Girls College
- Massachusetts General Court, legislature of that U.S. state
- Media Gateway Controller, a device in Voice over IP networks
- Medical Grade Cannabis
- Megestrol caproate, a progestin
- Mekong-Ganga Cooperation
- Melbourne Girls' College
- MGC, a British sports car.
- Michael Gordon Clifford
- Middle Georgia College
- Midsize Gas Carrier, a type of ship
- Midwest Gaming Classic, video game trade show in Wisconsin
- Mississippi Gulf Coast
- Mitsubishi Gas Chemical Company, Inc.
- Museums and Galleries Commission
- The Mircom Group of Companies
- Mekong–Ganga Cooperation, an intergovernmental organization in South Asia
- The unofficial short-form for the British Columbia Medal of Good Citizenship. Note that this initialism is purely for administrative convenience and the award does not convey the right to post-nominal initials.
