= Death of Shane Todd =

2012 death of an American engineer in Singapore

Shane Todd
- Died: Singapore
- Cause of death: Asphyxia
- Education: University of Florida, University of California, Santa Barbara
- Parent(s): Mary Todd and Rick Todd

Shane Todd was an American engineer who died under disputed circumstances in Singapore in June 2012. Local authorities said Todd had committed suicide, though his family insists that he was murdered, possibly in connection with the work he had been doing at the Institute for Micro Electronics ("IME"), part of the Singaporean government-run Agency for Science, Technology and Research ("A*STAR") involving a gallium nitride-based semiconductor amplifying device purportedly for the Chinese telecom company Huawei.

Todd's death was the subject of a major investigative report in February 2013 by the Financial Times newspaper. The article carried the Todd family's claim that Singapore Police Force had not properly investigated Todd's death, and also contained their allegations that the IME was collaborating on a project with potential military implication with Huawei, a major Chinese electronics and telecommunications company. Both Huawei and A*STAR's IME institute subsequently denied that their work had progressed beyond the discussion stage. Ex-colleagues of Todd also testified that there had been no such collaborations. The police also defended their role in the investigation.

The Todd family's suspicions of foul play stemmed from various pieces of circumstantial evidence. For instance, they alleged that the Singapore Police had failed to properly investigate the scene of the crime, that the police neglected to dust for fingerprints, that the suicide notes ostensibly left by Todd were out of character, that the crime scene did not match the description given by authorities, and that a pathologist in the United States found that his body showed evidence of a struggle, rather than a suicide.

According to the Todd family, Shane Todd had told his family that he was increasingly anxious at work in the months leading up to his death. He worried the project he was working on with an unnamed Chinese company may have been endangering U.S. national security. He had also told his family that he felt he was under threat because of his work with the Chinese.

A coroner's inquiry was conducted over two weeks from 13 to 27 May 2013. Evidence was presented to show that multiple visits had been made to suicide websites from Todd's laptop and that he had been prescribed antidepressants by a psychiatrist. The finding by the Singapore government's forensic pathologist that no injuries to Todd's body indicated he was garotted or had put up a struggle was corroborated by two independent Chief Medical Examiners from the United States. No hacking attempts on Todd's laptop to upload suicide notes were found. On July 8, the coroner released the verdict which ruled the death as "asphyxia due to hanging".

== Background ==
Todd had earned his bachelor's and master's degree in electrical engineering at the University of Florida in 2003 and 2005, respectively. He then pursued doctoral studies at the University of California, Santa Barbara, where he researched silicon-based transmission lines. Upon completion of his PhD in 2010, he took a job offer to work for IME.

During this assignment, he worked on a project involving a proposed cooperation between A*STAR's IME institute and Huawei Technology. A project proposal outline recovered from Todd's external hard drive found in his apartment showed that there was a proposal for IME and Huawei to co-develop an amplifying device powered by gallium nitride (GaN). Such devices have both commercial as well as military applications. Todd's research in GaN also involved traveling to New Jersey to procure the TurboDisc® K465i™ GaN MOCVD System, equipment necessary to further the GaN research from Veeco, a U.S. publicly listed technology company.

As Todd worked on GaN research, he became increasingly anxious about his role. In conversations with his family, he said that he was collaborating with a Chinese company, and was "being asked to do things" that made him uncomfortable. Namely, his mother said that "he felt he was being asked to compromise American security." On one occasion, Todd told his mother that if she didn't hear from him every week, she should contact the American embassy. He turned to religion, and was prescribed antidepressants to help cope with the stress.

In late February 2012, Todd decided to leave IME and return to the United States. He put in 60 days' notice, then decided to stay an additional 30 days. As his time at IME ran down, he was offered a job with Nuvotronics, an American research firm. Friends and co-workers recalled that he was upbeat on his final day of work at IME on Friday, June 22.

Todd's girlfriend, Shirley Sarmiento, expected to hear from him on Friday or Saturday, but he did not respond to her messages. On Sunday, June 24, she went to his apartment. Finding the door unlocked, she entered, and discovered Todd's body hanging from a bathroom door. A chair was about five feet away. Sarmiento then contacted Todd's family in the United States to alert them to his death.

== Alleged inconsistencies ==
The Singapore Police were quoted as saying that Todd "drilled holes into his bathroom wall, bolted in a pulley, then slipped a black strap through the pulley and wrapped it around the toilet several times. He then tethered the strap to his neck and jumped from a chair." However, when Todd's family arrived at his apartment in Singapore after receiving news of his death, they noted that the scene was not as described: there were no holes in the marble walls of the bathroom, and neither were there bolts or screws. The location of the toilet was also not where the police report indicated it was. Furthermore, there were no signs of an investigation at the scene; police had not put up crime scene tape or dusted for fingerprints.

The Financial Times reported that Todd's home "looked like a snapshot of a man in the middle of a move". Before his death, Todd was in the middle of doing the laundry. He had packed boxes in preparation for his move back to the United States, and had clean clothes folded on the couch. He was also apparently in the middle of trying to sell his furniture, and had been writing out price tags. His airline ticket back to the United States was on the table, but his laptop and phone had been taken away by the police.

Police found several suicide notes allegedly left by Todd, but his family and girlfriend told the Financial Times that they did not seem to be Todd's writing. In one note, he apologized for being a burden to his family, but his mother said he had never been a burden; he had excelled at everything, she said. Another note praised the management of IME. His girlfriend was incredulous, noting that Todd "hated his job." After his mother read the notes, she told the police detectives, "My son might have killed himself, but he did not write this."

David Camp, a criminologist from Illinois, analyzed the suicide note side by side with a collection of Todd's other writings and told reporters that he held the opinion that the suicide note found by the police was not written by Todd. Camp concluded that it wasn't written by an American and wasn't typical of a suicide, that he felt the note was detached and unemotional, and did not match up with Todd's personality. He added that "everything about [the suicide note] was different: different format, different cultural backgrounds, different wording, different sentence length, everything about it was completely different, which leads to one conclusion; someone else wrote it."

Employees at IME were reportedly told not to speak to reporters about Todd's death. However, one of Todd's colleagues did reach out to his parents, telling them, "After collecting all information available, I cannot believe it is a suicide case. Actually, no one believes it...I truly hope that [the] FBI can be involved and perform further investigation."

The official autopsy report provided by the Singapore Police said that Todd's cause of death was "asphyxia due to hanging." But on his body, Todd's family found bruises on his hands and a bump on his forehead, neither of which was mentioned in the autopsy report. Suspecting foul play, they asked the mortuary to photograph Shane's body before burial, and send the photos to Edward Adelstein, a county-level deputy medical examiner in Missouri. Adelstein's initial theory was that Todd's wounds did not support the suicide hypothesis. Instead, it appeared Todd was involved in a fight with an attacker and died by "garrotting". The original pathologist in Singapore dismissed Adelstein's conclusions, stating that Adelstein had not seen the body and had mistaken the post-mortem pooling of blood in the hands for bruises.

== FBI involvement ==
The FBI offered assistance to authorities in Singapore to investigate Todd's death, but their help was initially refused. On 28 February 2013, Singapore Police requested help from the FBI on two specific areas regarding the case, namely (a) an external hard drive that contains some files related to a possible cooperation between Huawei and IME, and (b) Todd's medical records when he consulted a psychiatrist in 2002. This occurred after the Todd family did not respond to earlier requests by Singapore's police to share potential evidence. The Todds had found a hard disk in Shane's room and hired a private forensic investigator to investigate its contents. The investigator noted that the disk was accessed 3 days after Shane's death, opened a copy of a file related to his work, then deleted the copy. The Todds refused to hand it over to the Singapore's police directly and initially the FBI as well, stating: "It doesn't make sense for us to give information to the FBI until they're given full access to the investigation." In particular, the Todds claim that the Singapore's police prematurely concluded that Shane Todd's death was suicide.

Singapore's Minister for Foreign Affairs, K. Shanmugam pledged that Singapore Police would share evidence with the FBI, but stopped short of agreeing to the Todds' request for the FBI to lead the investigation. After the Todds turned the hard disk over to the FBI, the FBI issued a report on May 9 supporting the Singapore's police's claims that the hard disk was accessed by the police who were checking for evidence, and not some unknown third party. The report explained that the file in question was a temporary file that had been automatically created and deleted by the Microsoft software when the police investigator was accessing the hard disk. It also emerged that the hard drive was in fact handed over to the Todds by the Singapore police in the presence of U.S. embassy staff, even though the Todds claimed to have found it themselves.

== Publicity and response ==
A grassroots petition was started in 2013 on the White House website (whitehouse.gov) asking then President Obama to direct the Department of Justice to thoroughly investigate, under the federal witness murder statute, whether Todd was killed to keep him from talking to U.S. authorities about his work with the Chinese.

Shane Todd's parents raised their concerns and questions to the U.S. Embassy in Singapore, to the Singapore Police, to the Agency for Science, Technology and Research ("A*STAR") run IME institute, and also asked whether the FBI could join the investigation, which would require an agreement between the Singaporean and U.S. governments. Shane Todd's parents have also been pushing for a congressional investigation into their son's death. Starting from the original Financial Times investigative report, they received publicity on their son's case from several major news outlets. Max Baucus, a Democratic Montana senator, and Frank Wolf, a Republican member of the House of Representatives from Virginia, have both met with Shane's parents. Baucus has brought the case to the attention of the White House.

The Senate Finance Committee, which Max Baucus chaired, subsequently raised the issue surrounding Shane's death in face-to-face meetings with Singapore's U.S. Embassy staffers and Singaporean officials.

Following the conclusion of the coroner's inquiry into Todd's death, the U.S. embassy in Singapore issued a statement saying that the inquiry was "comprehensive, fair and transparent."

== Singapore Coroner Inquiry ==
An inquiry into the cause of Todd's death was launched on 13 May 2013 by Singaporean authorities. The Todd family was permitted to pose relevant questions, through a counsel or by themselves, to the witness about the investigation findings and the forensic medical reports. The Todd family appointed five lawyers from three Singapore law firms: Gloria James and Amarjit Singh of M/s Gloria James-Civetta & Co, Steven Lam of JTJB Lawyers, Peter Ong Lip Cheng and Foo Cheow Ming of M/s Peter Ong & Raymond Tan.

It is only after this process that the State Coroner reviewed the evidence adduced and determined the cause and circumstances connected with the death of Shane Todd.

=== Timeline ===
13 May, during the first day of the inquiry, the government's lawyer, Tai Wei Shyong, presented evidence that Todd's laptop revealed he had accessed suicide-related websites 19 times between 10 March 2012 and 23 May 2012. Todd had earlier consulted a psychiatrist and had been prescribed anti-depressants. The state counsel presented a report by the FBI verifying that the hard drive allegedly found by the Todds was the same one which the Singapore police had taken from the apartment and subsequently given to the Todds after they did not find suspicious material in it.

14 May, Montana's senators want U.S. research funds withheld from Shane Todd's Singaporean employer until the FBI has full access to evidence.

16 May, the 3rd day of the inquest, senior consultant forensic pathologist Wee Keng Poh of the Health Sciences Authority, who had supervised the post-mortem examination, refuted the October claim by Adelstein that Todd had been garrotted and reiterated that evidence on the case showed that Shane Todd's death was caused by hanging. This conclusion was supported by two U.S.-based medial examiners who had reviewed the autopsy reports: David Fowler, chief medical examiner for the State of Maryland; and Valerie Josephine Rao, chief medical examiner of District 4 and part of District 3, Jacksonville, Florida.

20 May, IME's Deputy executive director of research Patrick Lo was asked whether he had tried to influence the testimonies given by his employees, based on a recording made during a briefing he gave them. Lo said his objective was to inform them of their obligation to tell the truth to the police, as well as the company's obligation of confidentiality to its clients, including Huawei. On the Todds' claims that Todd had been ordered to handcopy gallium nitride (GaN) recipes when Todd was sent to a U.S.-based vendor for training, Lo said that "such a formula would be "useless", because even one for a simple LED light would have some 6,000 entries, and it would not have been possible to handcopy without inaccuracies." Lo also testified that IME does not conduct any classified military research. Employees of IME also testified that although there were meetings between their company and Huawei, including one where Todd and senior employees of Huawei were involved, nothing had been finalized.

21 May, the sixth day of the inquest, Adelstein, who had told the inquiry that he wasn't a qualified forensic pathologist, after reviewing new medical evidence, retracted his previous claim that Todd was garroted, and speculated instead that Todd could have been disabled with a taser, then killed with an armlock. His conclusions were based on reviewing photos of Todd's body and other circumstantial evidence. He also asserted that Todd was "a very dangerous person" to IME and Huawei Technologies, that "they had him killed" and well-trained "assassins" may have been involved, without offering evidence to support his claim. Todd's parents walked out of the inquest after complaining about what they called the introduction of a surprise witness—Luis Alejandro Andro Montes, who was an ex-colleague of Todd. Although the witness was named on 13 May, day 1 of the inquiry, Montes hadn't arrived in Singapore until 18 May, his written testimony was taken on 20 May and subsequently made known to the courts and the Todds on the morning of 21 May. Mary Todd told reporters that they did not believe the testimony, and wanted time to investigate. Todd's father said "The prosecution brings forth witnesses at the last minute and we have no chance to question it. Basically we actually have lost faith in the process". The Todds also claimed that neither they nor Todd's girlfriend Shirley Sarmiento recognized Luis.

22 May, chief medical examiners David Fowler (Maryland) and Valerie Josephine Rao (Florida) testified as independent experts and rejected Adelstein's murder theory from the day before. Fowler said that the marks on Todd's hands identified by Adelstein as bruises from a fight were actually "the most classical example of post-mortem lividities" in hanging cases and declared that "the cause of death was asphyxia due to hanging". Rao agreed that there were no injuries indicative of a struggle and cited suicide as the cause of death. The Todds discharged their lawyers, saying that they "no longer have confidence in the transparency and fairness of the system," and will no longer participate in the inquiry, and "will return to the U.S. as soon as possible and turn to the court of public opinion for judgment" on their belief that Todd was murdered.

23 May, Montes testified that he had last seen Shane on 23 June 2012, contradicting the Todds' claims that Shane had been killed before that date. He also contradicted the Todds' assertion that they did not know him, testifying that he had met them in their hotel room days after Shane's death, in the presence of other close friends of Shane's.

28 May, Inquiry Ended.

=== Verdict ===
The verdict on the inquiry was released on 8 July 2013, with the coroner ruling that Todd died of "asphyxia due to hanging" and said he was satisfied "there was no foul play".
