= SPX Technologies =

American manufacturing company

SPX Technologies, Inc.
- Formerly: SPX Corporation
- Type: Public
- Traded as: NYSE: SPXC; S&P 400 component
- Industry: Multi-industry
- Founded: 1912; 114 years ago in Muskegon, Michigan
- Headquarters: Charlotte, North Carolina, U.S.
- Key people: Eugene Joseph Lowe (CEO)
- Products: Cooling towers, boilers, cable locators, power transformers
- Revenue: $2.265 billion (2025)
- Number of employees: 4,300 (December 31, 2024)
- Website: www.spx.com

SPX Technologies, Inc. is an American manufacturing company, headquartered in Charlotte, North Carolina. The company operates within four markets: heating, ventilation, and air conditioning (HVAC), detection and measurement, power transmission and generation, and engineered solutions. Examples of SPX's products include cooling towers and boilers, underground pipe and cable locators, power transformers, and heat exchangers. Brands include Waukesha, Dielectric, Genfare, Fahrenheat, Radiodetection, and Pearpoint. SPX operates in 17 countries with a sales presence in 100 countries, and over 6,000 employees worldwide. In 2019, the company earned approximately $1.5 billion in annual revenue.

== History ==
SPX was founded on December 20, 1911, in Muskegon, Michigan, as the Piston Ring Company by Charles E. Johnson and Paul R. Beardsley. The company was entirely devoted to the production of piston rings of leading engine builders. In 1925, Piston Ring bought the No-Leak-O Piston Ring Company, allowing the company to increase production of engine components. After acquiring Accuralite Company in 1931, the company changed its name to Sealed Power Corporation and also started manufacturing piston rings, pistons and cylinder sleeves for various military applications.

Sealed Power Co.’s first plant opened outside Muskegon in 1946. In 1957, a Replacement Distribution Center was added in LaGrange, Indiana. The new distribution center serviced 33 smaller distribution outlets in major cities throughout the United States and Canada.

The company acquired Kent-Moore Corporation in 1982. Within its first year, Kent-Moore contributed $86 million to Sealed Power. In 1985, Sealed Power expanded even further by acquiring the Owatonna Tool Company (OTC) and its subsidiaries. That same year the V.L. Churchill Group of Daventry, England, was also acquired, giving Sealed Power an international overseas presence. Through its multiple acquisitions, the company broadened its production and market scope. In 1988, the company changed its name to SPX Corporation. For the next 10 years, they remained a U.S.-centric automotive component manufacturer with nearly $1 billion in sales. In 1998, General Signal Corporation was acquired for $2.3 billion, specializing in production of process control, electrical control, and industrial technological industries. United Dominion Industries Limited, a manufacturer of engineered products, was acquired in 2001. SPX's headquarters relocated to Charlotte, North Carolina, in 2002.

In 2012, SPX president Charles E Johnson II sold its Service Solutions business for approximately $1.15 billion to Robert Bosch GmbH.

In 2015, SPX Flow was founded, a spin-off from its parent company. Led by Chris Kearney and Jeremy Smeltser, SPX Flow supplies highly engineered flow components, process equipment, and turn-key systems to food and beverage, power and energy, and industrial end markets. After splitting from SPX Flow, SPX acquired both CUES Inc., a pipeline inspection manufacturer, and Schonstedt Instrument Co., a manufacturer and distributor of magnetic locator products, in 2018. TSPX Flow was acquired by Lone Star Funds for $3.8 billion in 2022.

In December 2015, SPX announced that it would also acquire the marine and aviation warning-light corporation Carmanah Technologies.

In 2019, the corporation acquired SGS Refrigeration Inc., a manufacturer and supplier of industrial refrigeration products, following its ongoing partnership since 2015. Patterson-Kelley was acquired that same year to join SPX's HVAC solutions division.

In September 2020, SPX acquired ULC Robotics Inc., a developer of robotics systems and inspection technology for natural gas networks, in a $135 million deal. Sensors & Software Inc. was also acquired by SPX in November 2020. Sensors & Software Inc. is an Ontario-based manufacturer and distributor of Ground Penetrating Radar (GPR) products used for geotechnical and geological investigations, unexploded ordnance detection, and locating underground utilities. The company joined SPX's Radiodetection business unit. From 2017 to 2020, SPX's earnings per share (EPS) has grown by 70% per year. Its revenue is up by 1.6% in 2020.

In February 2024, SPX expanded its HVAC business by acquiring, Ingenia Technologies, a Canadian manufacturer of custom commercial air quality systems, headquartered in Mirabel, Quebec, for $300 million.
