= Secutron =

Company in Vaughan, Ontario

Coordinates: 43°47′21″N 79°31′45″W

Secutron Inc.

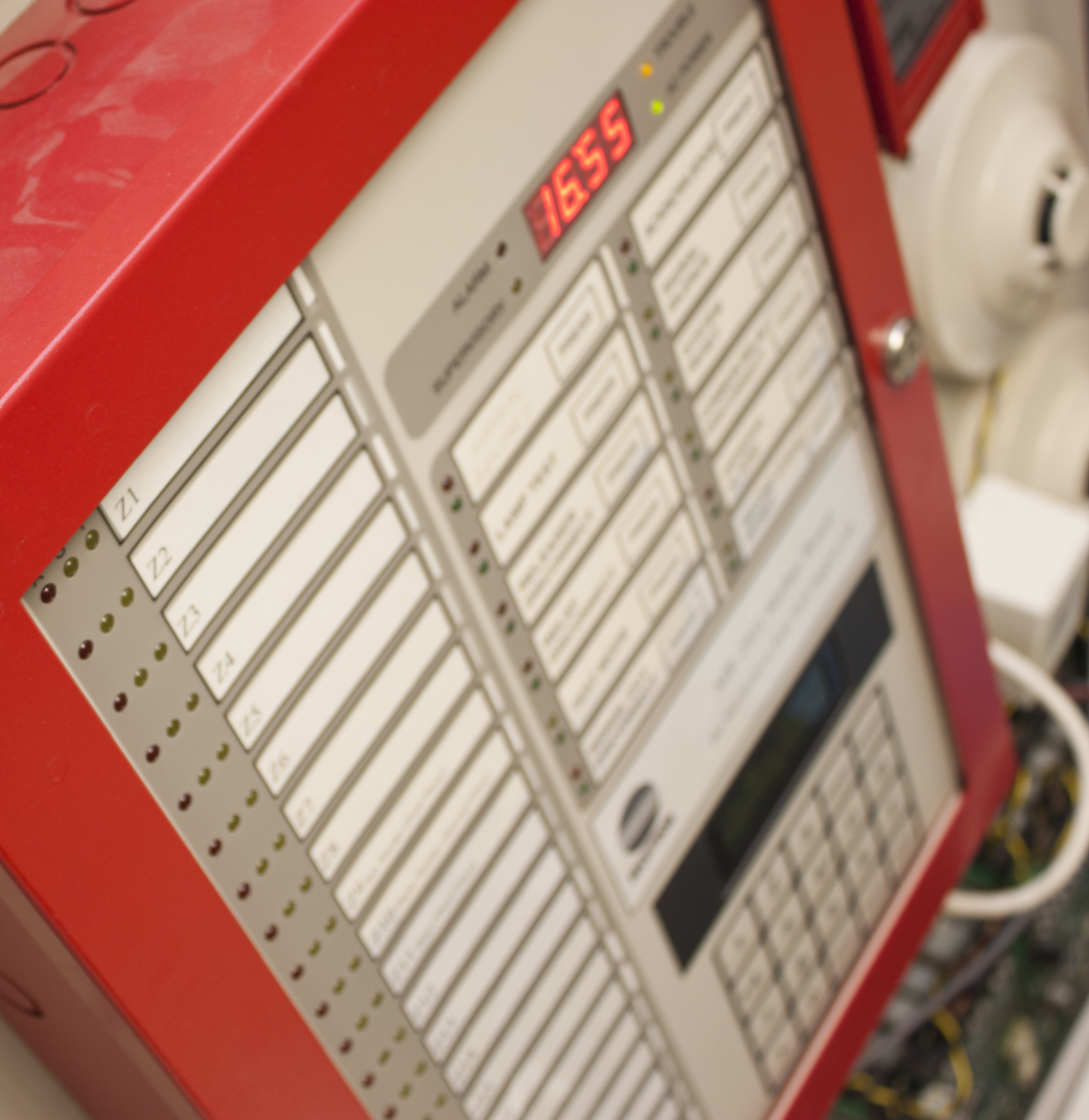
- Secutron Fire Alarm Control Panel from 2011
- Company type: Privately held company
- Industry: Electronics
- Founded: 1973; 53 years ago
- Headquarters: Vaughan, Ontario, Canada
- Key people: Tony Falbo (President & CEO)
- Products: Electronics, Fire alarm, Fire alarm control panel, Electronic Components
- Parent: Mircom
- Website: www.secutron.com

Secutron is a Canadian manufacturer of engineered fire alarm systems supported by a global network of authorized Engineered Systems Distributors. Secutron is registered trademark of Mircom Technologies Ltd. and part of the Mircom Group of companies.

Secutron has been manufacturing fire alarm systems since 1973, including conventional and intelligent fire alarm control panels, fire alarm networks, fire and security integration systems, and fire alarm accessories. Company is certified to the ISO 9001:2008 standards and guidelines.

== History ==
Secutron Old Logo

Secutron was founded in 1973. In 2004 Mircom acquired Secutron from Tyco Group.

== Standards ==
Secutron is a member of recognized industry organizations including:

- National Fire Protection Association (NFPA)
- California Automatic Fire Alarm Association (CAFAA)
- Security Industry Association (SIA)
- Fire and Security Association of India (FSAI)

Secutron products carry all the requisite regulatory agency approvals including Underwriters Laboratories (UL), Factory Mutual (FM), California State Fire Marshal (CSFM), City of New York (MEA), US Coast Guard, Loss Prevention Certification Board (LPCB) UK and American Bureau of Shipping (ABS).
