= Schonstedt Instrument Company =

American firm based in West Virginia

Schonstedt Instrument Company is an American firm, based in West Virginia and founded in 1953 by Erick O. Schonstedt.

Founder Erick O. Schonstedt designed his first instruments for use in the aerospace industry, outfitting over 400 satellites with magnetometers, along with the Hubble Space Telescope.

In 1995 Erick O. Schonstedt died and unexpectedly bequeathed the firm to Augustana College in Rock Island, Illinois — Schonstedt never attended the school, but was a trustee. Beginning in January 2007, Schonstedt has partnered with the United Nations Mine Action Service (UNMAS) to distribute free magnetic locators for use in needy countries with substantial mine fields.

In 1998 the company moved to its headquarters location in the Eastern Panhandle of West Virginia, about an hour's drive from Washington and Baltimore. Schonstedt Instrument Company's headquarters and manufacturing is located in Kearneysville, West Virginia.

In 2018, the company was acquired by SPX Corporation.
