= Leeds & Northrup =

Former United States electric technology company

Leeds & Northrup (L&N) was an American electric technology company founded in Philadelphia, Pennsylvania, in 1899. It was formed by Morris E. Leeds and Edwin Fitch Northrup.

L&N merged with General Signal in 1978. General Signal divested itself of its L&N unit in 1995 by selling it to Honeywell.
