= Morris E. Leeds =

American electrical engineer (1869–1952)

- Born: March 6, 1869; Philadelphia
- Died: February 8, 1952 (aged 82)
- Education: University of Berlin; Haverford College
- Awards: ASME Medal (1946); IEEE Edison Medal (1948)

Morris E. Leeds (March 6, 1869 in Philadelphia – February 8, 1952) was an American electrical engineer known for his many inventions in the field of electrical measuring devices and controls.

== Biography ==
Leeds was born into a staunch Quaker household in Philadelphia in 1869 to Barclay Robert and Mary (Maule) Leeds. After attending the Westtown School, he graduated with a B.S. from Haverford College in 1888. During 1892–93, he was a graduate student in physics at the University of Berlin.

After graduation in 1888, Leeds started working in industry and by 1899 Leeds was cofounder and managing partner of his own firm, Morris E. Leed's & Co., manufacturing electrical instruments. In 1903, he founded a second company called Leeds & Northrup with Edwin Fitch Northrup to manufacture electrical instruments and pyrometers. He served as president of Leeds & Northrup until 1939 and chairman of the board of directors until 1952. He remained an active Quaker his entire life.

Leeds was inducted into the Academy of Natural Sciences, the American Academy of Political and Social Science, the American Academy of Arts and Sciences, and the American Philosophical Society. He received the Edward Longstreth Medal from the Franklin Institute in 1920, the Henry Laurence Gantt Medal in 1936, the ASME Medal in 1946, and the IEEE Edison Medal in 1948.

== Patents ==
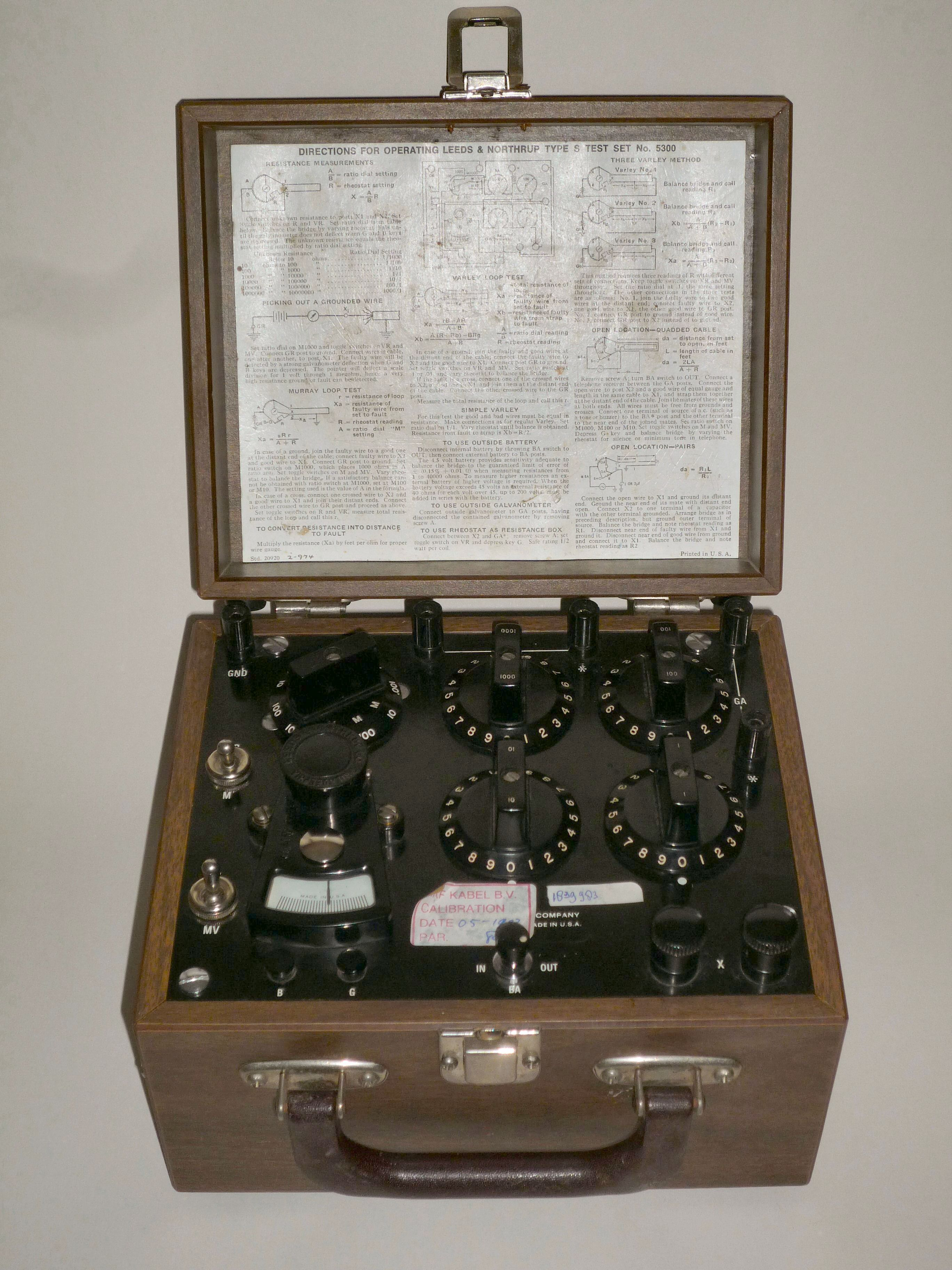
Test set to localize failures in (underground) cables, manufactured by the Leeds & Northrup company

- US Patent No. 965.824 - recorder, 1910.
- US Patent No. 1.057.416 - speed control apparatus, 1913.
- US Patent No. 1.097.651 - measuring apparatus, 1914.
- US Patent No. 1.125.699 - electrical recorder, 1915.
- US Patent No. 1.192.911 - composite resistance, 1916.
- US Patent No. 1.332.182 - automatic control, 1917
