= OTC Tool Company =

American tool and equipment manufacturer

OTC Tool Company logo

OTC Tools (originally Owatonna Tool Company) is a tool and equipment manufacturer. It was founded in Owatonna, Minnesota, by Godfrey Kaplan, who operated a small machine shop there. Kaplan's son Rueben, invented the "Grip-O-Matic" universal gear puller and received his first patent. The tool remains virtually unchanged to this day.

== History ==
By 1934, OTC was selling a variety of mechanic's tools to farmers and service stations. The tools were sold directly to the customer from makeshift display boards fitted into panel trucks or converted autos. When World War II broke out in 1939, the U.S. Army and Navy bought large quantities of OTC tools and by 1945, the company had doubled its staff. In 1950, Kaplan began work in ultra-high-pressure fluid power technology, a new technology for hydraulics manufacturers of the day. One development was a twin-cylinder ram that operated at 10,000 psi—much higher than any other devices of the day.

By 1985, OTC had an extensive line of tools and systems for both OEM and aftermarket customers. That success led to its acquisition by Sealed Power Corporation (now SPX Corporation) of Muskegon, MI. In December 2012 SPX was purchased by Robert Bosch GmbH and OTC became part of their Bosch Automotive Service Solutions division.

OTC is a global supplier of vehicle electronic diagnostic instruments; fuel systems service tools; special service tools; general purpose tools; pullers; heavy-duty tools; shop equipment and hydraulic components.
