= Axcelis Technologies =

American semiconductor equipment manufacturer

Coordinates: 42°34′33″N 70°54′18″W

Axcelis Technologies, Inc.

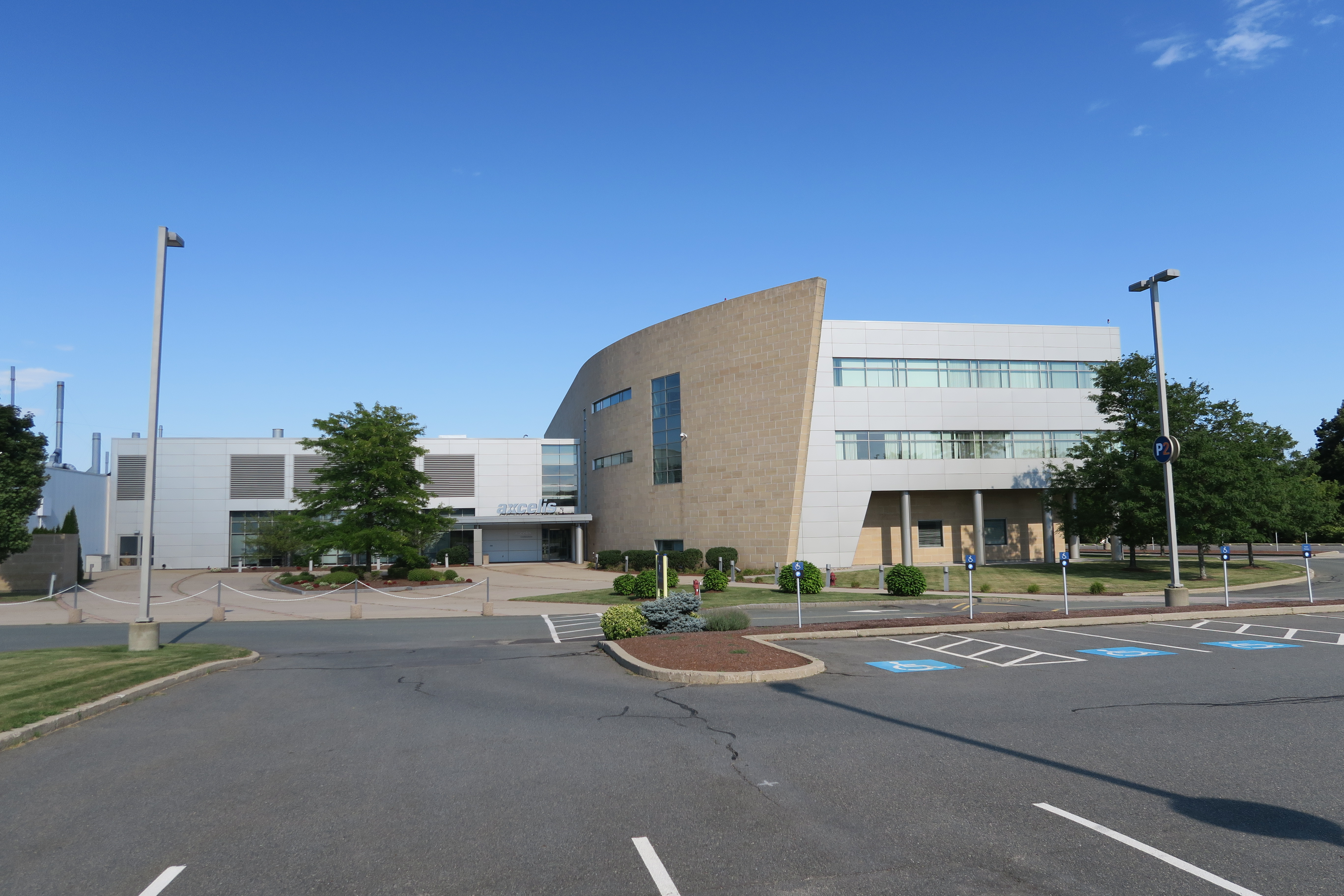
- Axcelis' headquarters
- Type: Public
- Traded as: Nasdaq: ACLS; S&P 600 component
- Industry: Semiconductor equipment
- Founded: 1995; 31 years ago
- Headquarters: Beverly, Massachusetts, United States
- Key people: Russell Low (president and CEO)
- Revenue: ▲$919.9 million (2022)
- Operating income: ▲$212,361 million (2022)
- Net income: ▲$183,079 million (2022)
- Number of employees: 1,004 (2020)
- Website: axcelis.com

Axcelis Technologies, Inc. is an American company engaging in the design, manufacture, and servicing of capital equipment for the semiconductor manufacturing industry worldwide. It produces ion implantation systems, including high and medium current implanters, and high energy implanters, and curing systems used in the fabrication of semiconductor chips. The company was incorporated in 1995 and is headquartered in Beverly, Massachusetts, United States.

In 2000, Eaton Corporation spun off its semiconductor manufacturing equipment business as Axcelis Technologies.

On December 4, 2012 Axcelis Technologies decided "...that it will exit the dry-strip business and divest its dry-strip intellectual property and technology, including the advanced non-oxidizing process technology of its Integra product line, to Lam Research,...Axcelis will continue to ship its 300 mm dry-strip products through August 2013..."

In 2015, Axcelis sold its headquarters in a leaseback agreement.

In October 2025, Axcelis and Veeco agreed to merge in an all-stock transaction valued at approximately $4.4 billion, with Axcelis shareholders owning about 58% and Veeco shareholders about 42% of the combined company.

== See also ==
- List of S&P 600 companies
