= Subsurface utility engineering =

Subsurface utility engineering (SUE) refers to a branch of engineering that involves managing certain risks associated with utility mapping at appropriate quality levels, utility coordination, utility relocation design and coordination, utility condition assessment, communication of utility data to concerned parties, utility relocation cost estimates, implementation of utility accommodation policies, and utility design.

The SUE process begins with a work plan that outlines the scope of work, project schedule, levels of service vs. risk allocation and desired delivery method. Non-destructive surface geophysical methods are then leveraged to determine the presence of subsurface utilities and to mark their horizontal position on the ground surface. Vacuum excavation techniques are employed to expose and record the precise horizontal and vertical position of the assets. This information is then typically presented in CAD format or a GIS-compatible map. A conflict matrix is also created to evaluate and compare collected utility information with project plans, identify conflicts and propose solutions. The concept of SUE is gaining popularity worldwide as a framework to mitigate costs associated with project redesign and construction delays and to avoid risk and liability that can result from damaged underground utilities.

== History ==
The practice of collecting, recording and managing subsurface data has historically been widely unregulated. In response to this challenge, in 2003, The American Society of Civil Engineers (ASCE) developed standard 38-02: Guideline for the Collection and Depiction of Existing Subsurface Utility Data, which defined the practice of SUE. Many countries followed the U.S. lead by creating similar standards including Malaysia, Canada, Australia, Great Britain and most recently, Ecuador. Developed and refined over the last 20 years, SUE classifies information according to quality levels with an objective to vastly improve data reliability. This provides project owners and engineers with a benchmark to determine the integrity of utility data at the outset of an infrastructure project.

== Governing standards ==
A number of standards for care have been developed to maintain the use of SUE.

=== ASCE 38-22 Standard Guideline for Investigating and Documenting Existing Utilities ===
The update to ASCE Standard 38-02 has been published by ASCE and is available from the ASCE library. The updated Standard contains significant commentary and examples, new and revised definitions, and new provisions for guidance in performing utility investigations, learned since 38-02 was released.

=== ASCE Standard 38-02 ===
In 2003, the American Society of Civil Engineers (ASCE) published Standard 38-02 titled Standard Guideline for the Collection and Depiction of Existing Subsurface Utility Data. The standard defined SUE and set guidance for the collection and depiction of subsurface utility information. ASCE involvement with SUE is substantially through Utility Engineering & Surveying Institute (UESI). The ASCE standard presents a system to classify the quality of existing subsurface utility data, in accordance with four quality levels:

- Quality Level D. QL-D is the most basic level of information for utility locations. It comes from existing utility records or verbal recollections. QL-D is useful primarily for project planning and route selection activities.
- Quality Level C. QL-C involves surveying visible above ground utility facilities (e.g., manholes, valve boxes, etc.) and correlating this information with existing utility records (QL-D information).
- Quality Level B. QL-B involves the application of appropriate surface geophysical methods to determine the existence and horizontal position of virtually all subsurface utilities within a project's limits.
- Quality Level A. QL-A, also known as "daylighting", is the highest level of accuracy presently available. It provides information for the precise plan and profile mapping of underground utilities through the actual exposure of underground utilities (usually at a specific point), and also provides the type, size, condition, material and other characteristics of underground features. Exposure is typically achieved through hand digging or Hydro-Vacuuming.

=== Malaysia Standard Guideline for Underground Utility Mapping ===
The Standard Guideline for Underground Utility Mapping in Malaysia was launched in 2006 to create, populate and maintain the national underground utility database. This standard addresses issues such as roles of stakeholders and how utility information can be obtained, and was a call to action from the Malaysian government due to increasing demands for improvements on basic infrastructure facilities including utilities. The Standard is similar to ASCE 38-02, using quality levels D-A as its basis. Although it does not classify utility definition, colours or symbols, the Malaysian standard does specify an accuracy ±10 cm for both horizontal and vertical readings. The Standard is supported by the Malaysian government but is not backed by an Association or governing body.

=== CSA Standard S250 ===
In 2011, the Canadian Standards Association (CSA) released Standard S250 Mapping of Underground Utility Infrastructure. The Standard is described as a collective framework for best practices to map, depict and manage records across Canada. CSA S250 complements and extends ASCE Standard 38-02 by setting out requirements for generating, storing, distributing, and using mapping records to ensure that underground utilities are readily identifiable and locatable. Accuracy levels expand upon ASCE 38-02 Quality Level A, prescribing a finer level of detail to define the positional location of the infrastructure.

=== Standards Australia Committee AS 5488-2013 ===
In June, 2013, the Standards Australia Committee IT-036 on Subsurface Utility Engineering Information launched Standard 5488-2013 Classification of Subsurface Utility Information to provide utility owners, operators and locators with a framework for the consistent classification of information concerning subsurface utilities. The standard also provides guidance on how subsurface utility information can be obtained and conveyed to users.

In 2019 the standard was split into:

- AS 5488.1 Classification of Subsurface Utility Information (SUI) Part 1: Subsurface Utility Information
- AS 5488.2 Classification of Subsurface Utility Information (SUI) Part 2: Subsurface utility engineering (SUE)

The standards was since revised in 2022.

=== British Standards Institute PAS 128 ===
An industry consultation event in January 2012 kicked off the development of a British SUE standard. The first technical draft was reviewed by the committee in December 2012 and it was released for public/general industry review in March 2013. PAS 128 applies to the detection, verification and location of active, abandoned, redundant or unknown underground utilities and associated surface features that facilitate the location and identification of underground utility infrastructure. It sets out the accuracy to which the data is captured for specific purposes, the quality expected of that data and a means by which to assess and indicate the confidence that can be placed in the data.

=== Ecuadorian Institute for Standardization NTE INEN 2873 ===
In March, 2015 the Ecuadorian Institute for Standardization (INEN) have published the Standard NTE INEN 2873 for the Detection and Mapping of Utilities and Underground Infrastructure. This Standard establishes procedures for the mapping of utilities for the purposes of reducing the uncertainties created by existing underground utilities. Its systematic use can provide both a means for continual improvement in the reliability, accuracy, and precision of future utility records; and immediate value during project development. It combines two basic concepts. The first concept is the means of classifying the reliability of the existence and location of utilities already installed and hidden in the ground. It is used during project development and is a major component of Subsurface Utility Engineering (SUE). The second concept is how to specify the recording of utilities exposed during their installation or during maintenance/repair operations so that future records are reliable. It is used primarily during utility installation. It is fundamentally a traditional survey and documentation function. Combining these concepts will lead to a continual reduction in the risks created by underground utilities during future projects involving excavation of any kind.

== Applications ==
SUE is mainly used at the design stage of a capital works project and when information is being collected for asset management purposes. In both situations, a similar process is followed but the scope of the work and presentation of the information may vary. When a SUE investigation is carried out for a capital works project prior to construction, the objective is generally to collect accurate utility information within the project area to avoid conflict at later stages of the project.

For initiatives involving asset management, project owners may be missing information about their underground utilities or have inaccurate data. In this situation a SUE provider would collect the required information and add it to the asset management database, according to the four quality levels prescribed by ASCE Standard 38-02.

== See also ==
- Utility location
