= Edwin Fitch Northrup =

American engineer, professor, and novelist

Edwin Fitch Northrup (born February 23, 1866 – May 13, 1940) was a professor of physics known for his contributions to the study of substances at high temperatures and electronic conductivity. He was a professor at Princeton University from 1910 to 1919, an officer and adviser of Ajax Electro-Thermic Corp for twenty years and was affiliated with Leeds & Northrup for seven years. He held 104 patents on high-temperature measurement for new methods and instruments for the production and measurement of high temperatures.

Northrup was born in Syracuse to Ansel Judd Northrup and Eliza Sophia Fitch Northrup. He graduated from Amherst College in 1892 and did some post-graduate studies at Cornell University before earning a Ph.D. in physics from Johns Hopkins University in 1895. He then became assistant to Prof. Henry Augustus Rowland (died 1901) in the development of telegraph systems and became chief engineer at the newly founded Rowland Printing Telegraph Company. In 1903 he co-founded Leeds & Northrup with Morris E. Leeds.

Northrup founded the Pyro-electric Instrument Company and served as its president from 1916 to 1920. From 1920 until his death in 1940 he served as vice president and technical adviser for Ajax Electro-Thermic Corp.

Northrup invented the Ajax-Northrup high-frequency induction furnace, which in 1931 produced a temperature of 3,600 degrees. That year he was awarded the Acheson Award by the Electrochemical Society.

In 1937, Dr. Northrup published the science fiction novel Zero to Eighty under the pseudonym of Akkad Pseudoman.

== Bibliography ==
- Methods of Measuring Electrical Resistance (McGraw-Hill, 1912) ISBN 9781358324970
- Laws of Physical Science (Knopf, 1917)
- Zero to Eighty (as Akkad Pseudoman) (Knopf, 1937) ISBN 9781625790248
