= Underground Service Alert =

American utility organization

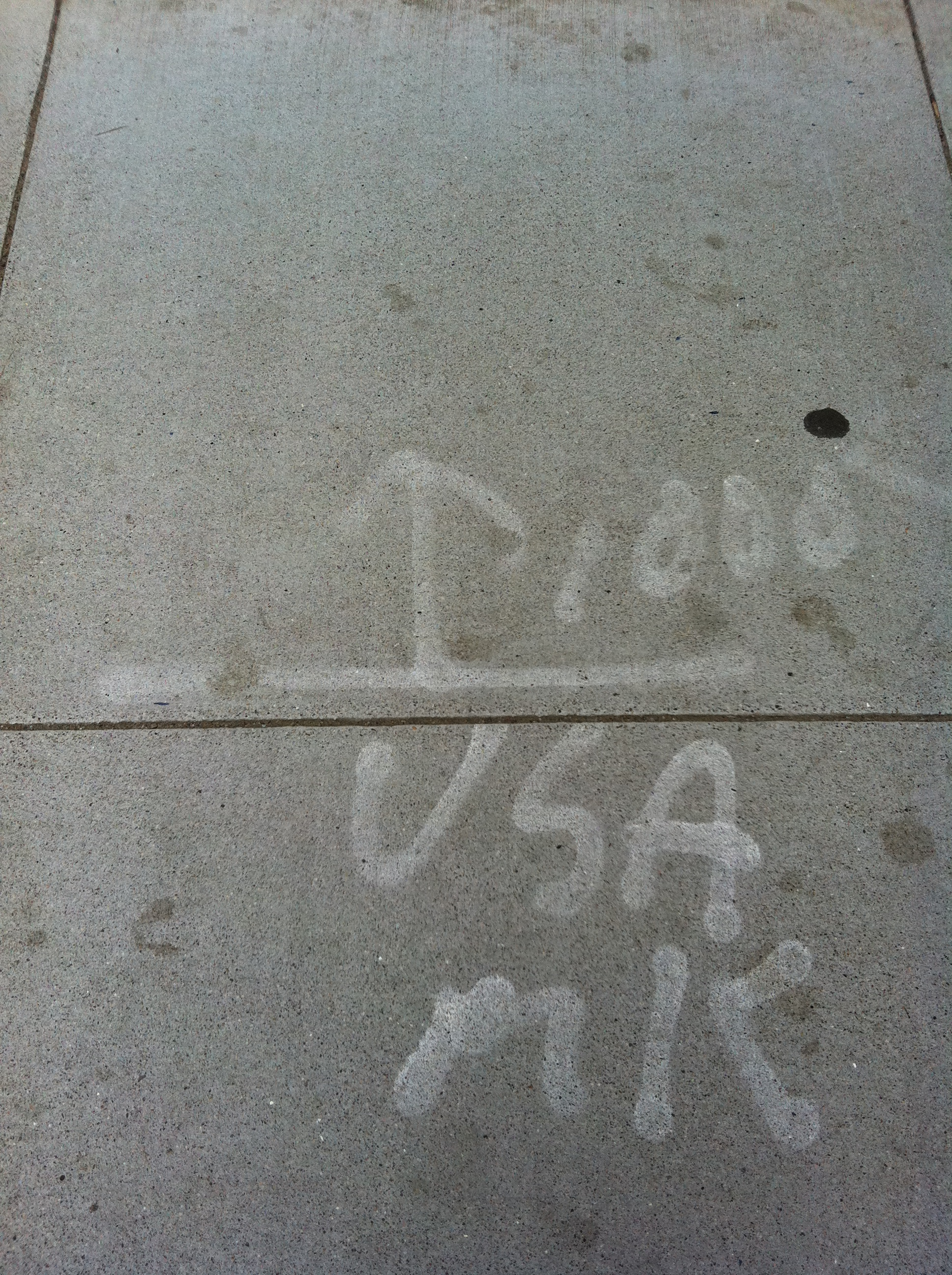
Underground Service Alert marking

Underground Service Alert (USA) is a shorten name that represents two separate non-profit mutual benefit organizations that links the excavation community and the owners of underground lines. Underground Service Alert of Northern California (USA North) and Underground Service Alert of Southern California (DigAlert). Although they are not affiliated and are ran by separate boards of directors, they share the common goal of safe digging. USA North handles Northern and Central California as well as Nevada. DigAlert handles nine Southern California counties. Calls to either center are free for all homeowners, excavators and professional contractors who are digging, blasting, trenching, drilling, grading, excavating, or otherwise moving any earth.

DigAlert began operation in 1974 in California and incorporated as a mutual-benefit nonprofit corporation in 1984. Each center receives planned excavation reports from public and private excavators and transmits those reports to participating members. Members include private companies and public agencies that have underground lines or facilities. The members will either mark or stake their facility, provide information or state their lines are not in conflict of the excavation site.

== See also ==
- DigAlert.org
- USANorth811.org
- Utility location
- 8-1-1
