= General Signal =

American equipment manufacturer

General Signal Corporation (formerly NYSE: GSX) was a publicly traded control equipment and systems company based in Stamford, Connecticut, and was listed in Standard & Poor's S&P 500 Composite Index of 500 of the largest public companies in the United States. It was a leading manufacturer of control systems technology primarily serving the transportation and telecommunication industries. In late 1998 it was bought for US$2 billion by a much smaller company, SPX Corporation.

== History ==
General Signal Technology Corp. was a technology manufacturing company making control equipment and systems. It traded on the New York Stock Exchange under the ticker symbol GSX.

In 1978, General Signal acquired Leeds & Northrup (L&N) through a merger.

In 1986, General Signal acquired Drytek, Inc., a plasma dry-etch company founded in August 1980 by Arthur W. Zafiropoulo. From that time he served as Drytek's President and CEO under General Signal as well.

In July 1987 Zafiropoulo also became President of Kayex, a semiconductor equipment manufacturer unit of General Signal.

In 1988, the company acquired Mirtone.

In February 1989, Zafiropoulo was promoted to become President of General Signal's subsidiary Semiconductor Equipment Group International, yet another semiconductor equipment company. He held the dual position of President of both that company and of Kayex at that time.

In September 1990, Zafiropoulo was promoted to President of General Signal's Ultratech Stepper Division.

In March 1993 Zafiropoulo acquired certain assets and liabilities of the Ultratech Stepper Division of General Signal, and the new company became independent, as Ultratech Stepper, Inc. Zafiropoulo became the President, CEO and Chairman of the newly independent Ultratech Stepper. Later it was renamed Ultratech, Inc.

In 1993 General Signal sold off Drytek, Inc. to Lam Research Corporation.

Through divestiture, General Signal became further streamlined in the mid 1990s. In 1995, it sold its L&N unit, part of the process controls sector, to Honeywell. It also sold Dynapower/Stratopower, part of the industrial technology sector.

In 1997 General Signal reported US$1.95 billion in sales. Electrical controls accounted for nearly half of 1997 revenues, with process controls making up a third, and industrial technology, less than a fifth.

General Signal was located at 1 High Ridge Park in Stamford, Connecticut. By 1997 the company had a presence on the internet which now redirects to the SPX website.

== SPX buyout ==
In 1995 SPX Corporation of Muskegon, Michigan, had been a slow growth Standard & Poor's SmallCap 600 company, primarily making tools for servicing automobile engine parts such as piston rings by vehicle dealers and service shops.

A former General Electric executive, John Blystone, then took over SPX as CEO and SPX's share price then rose almost fourfold during his two-and-a-half year tenure since late 1995.

By August 1998, with 1997 sales of just under US$1 billion, SPX moved to acquire General Signal Corp., a company twice its size, for US$45 per share in stock and cash, in a US$2 billion deal. With the acquisition SPX sought to enter the electrical and industrial controls business.

The deal was completed in the fourth quarter of 1998. General Signal shareholders ended up with 60% ownership of the combined entity, which retained the SPX Corporation name and headquarters. Michael Lockhart, General Signal's President and CEO, left upon completion of the acquisition, along with General Signal's other senior officers.

SPX expected to receive cost savings of US$55 million to US$60 million by 1999 in the first full year after the merger.
