= Mircom =

Life safety and communications systems manufacturer

Mircom Technologies Ltd.
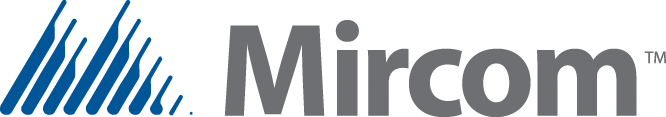
- Company type: Privately held company
- Industry: Fire Detection and Voice Alarm Notification Systems; Mass Notification Systems; Emergency Communication System; Fire Suppression Systems; Telephone Entry Communication Systems; Card Access Security Systems; Building Management Systems
- Founded: 1991
- Founder: Tony Falbo
- Headquarters: 43°47′21″N 79°31′45″W; Vaughan, Ontario, Canada
- Key people: Tony Falbo, CEO; Mark Falbo, President; Rick Falbo, VP Business & Market Development; Jason Falbo, VP Engineering
- Subsidiaries: Secutron
- Website: www.mircom.com

Mircom Technologies Ltd. is a manufacturer and distributor of life safety and communications systems including fire detection & alarm, voice evacuation, controlled access and security systems. The company is headquartered in Vaughan, Ontario, Canada.

== History ==
=== Mirtone ===
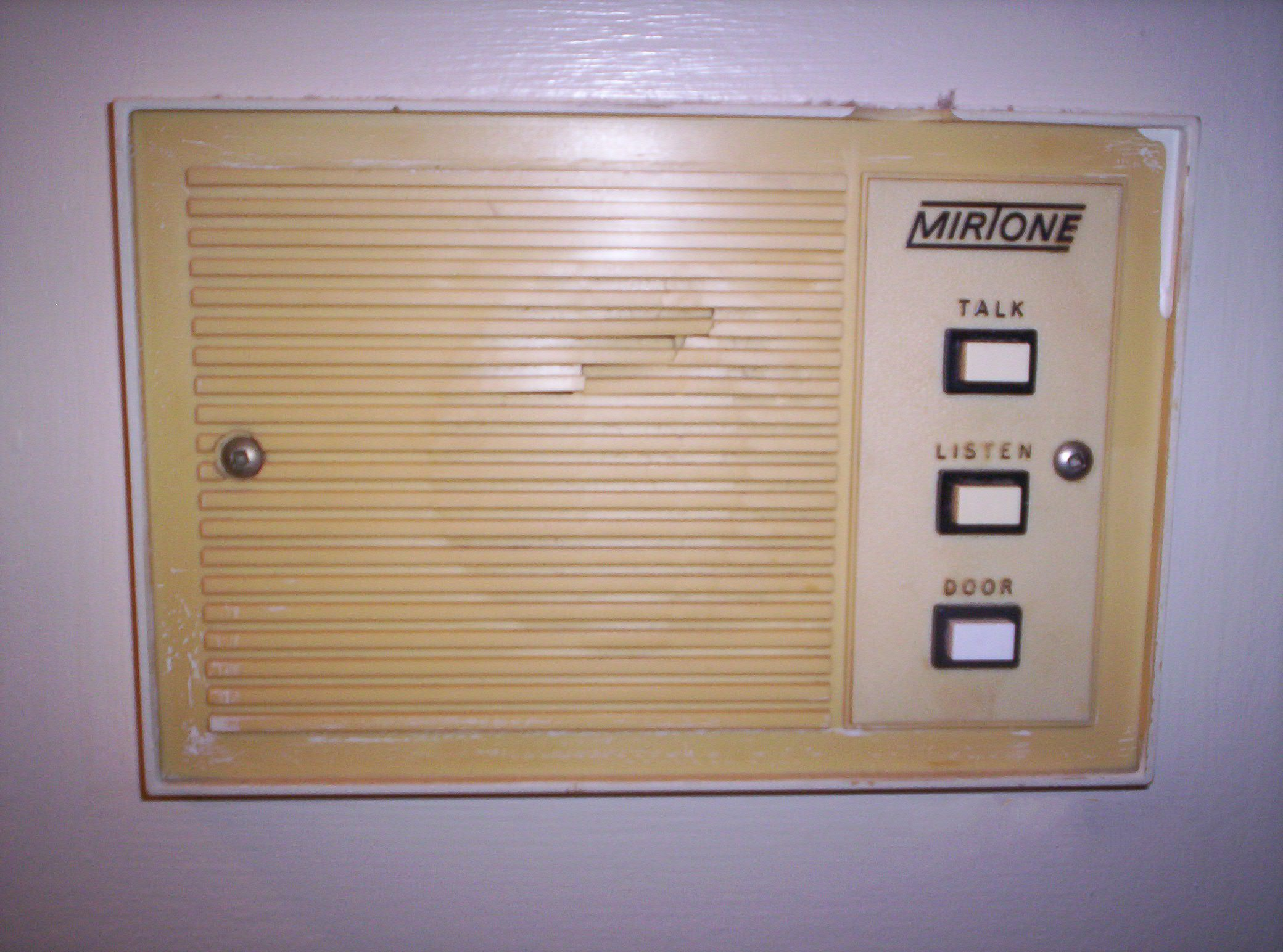
A 1980s Mirtone intercom system

Mirtone was founded by Manuel Mira in the early 1960s. The company started out manufacturing apartment intercoms in Toronto. The company expanded and started producing fire alarm systems and became the 2nd largest fire alarm manufacturer in Canada. Mirtone was bought by General Signal in 1988.

=== Mircom ===
Mircom was founded in 1991 by Tony Falbo in Ontario. In 1998 the company launched the FA-1000 Series Alarm Control Panel followed by the TAS-2000 and FX-2000 in 2000. In 2003, the company relocated to their current 82,000 ft^{2} (7,600 m^{2}) headquarters in Vaughan, Ontario. In 2004, the company launched their international sales department and acquired Secutron from SimplexGrinnell, a part of Tyco International. In 2005, the company acquired the PRO-2000 product line from Securiplex Inc. In 2006, the company become ISO 9000 certified and launched their Summit Systems Technologies. In 2007, the company opened an office in India. In 2008, the company expanded by opening their United States warehouse and facility in Niagara Falls, New York and opening a sales office in Los Angeles. The same year, the company opened branches in Alberta and British Columbia. In 2011, the company acquired Kost Fire Safety Limited in British Columbia, Murray Electronics Inc. in Ontario and opened a new office near Vancouver. In 2016, the company released QX-Mini and acquired Durham Central Fire Systems.

== Brands ==
=== Mircom ===
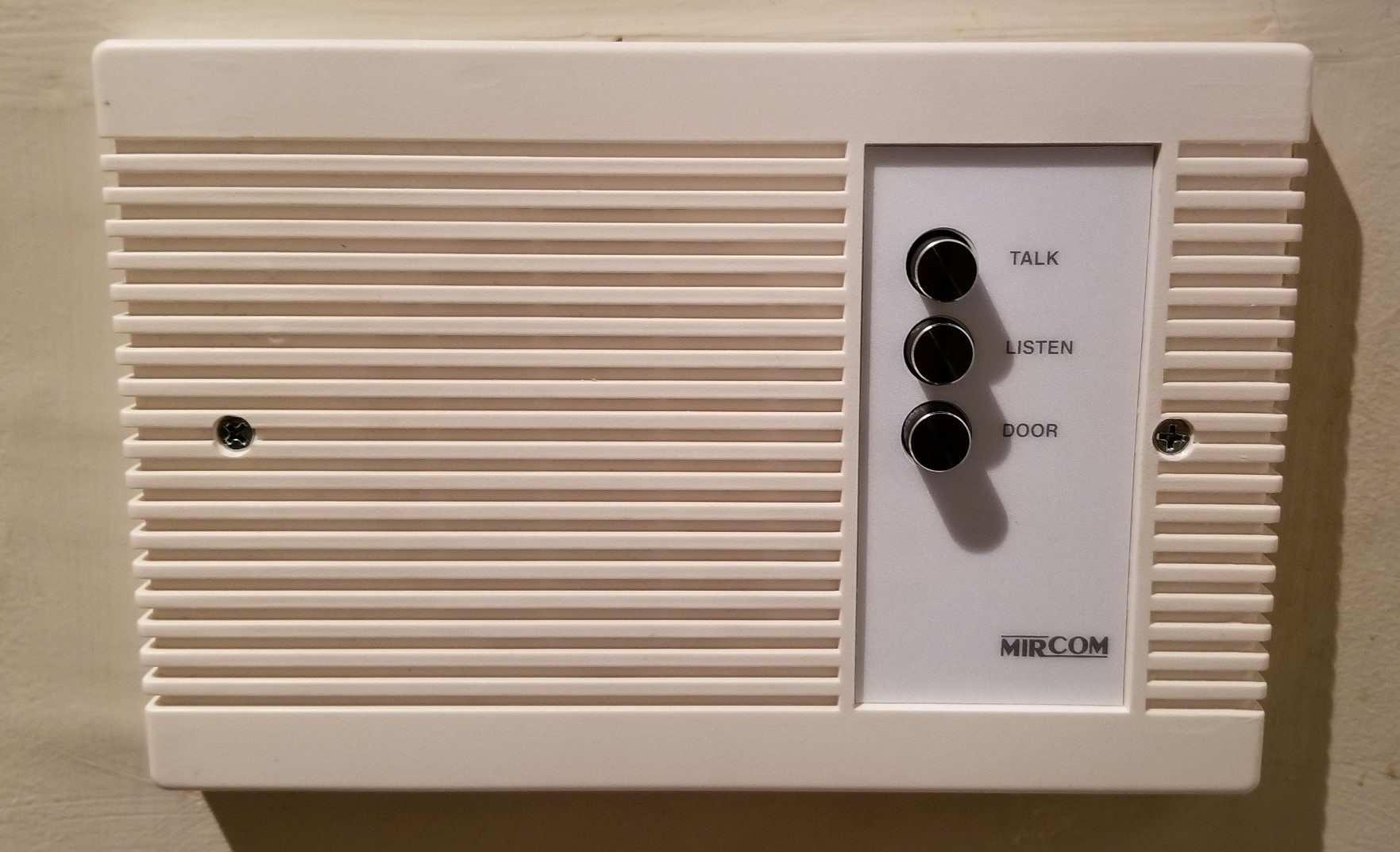
A Mircom IS-401B

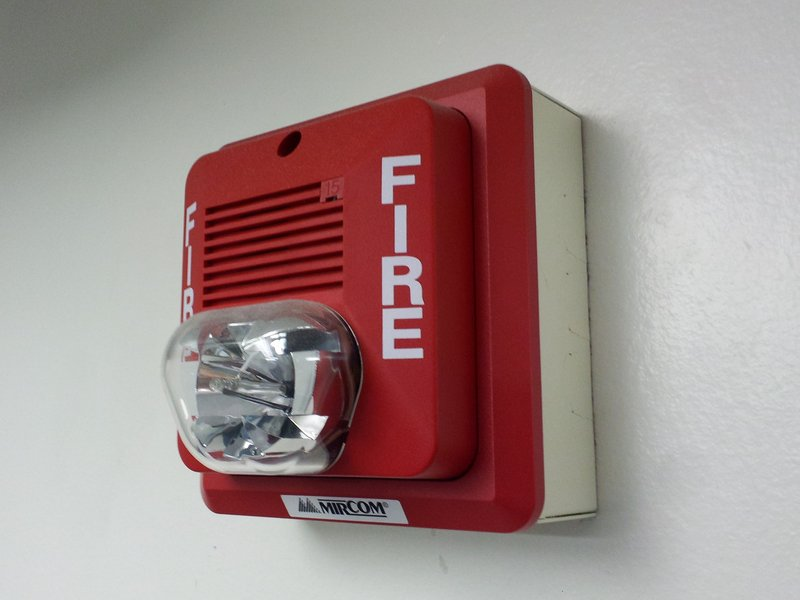
A Mircom Fire Alarm

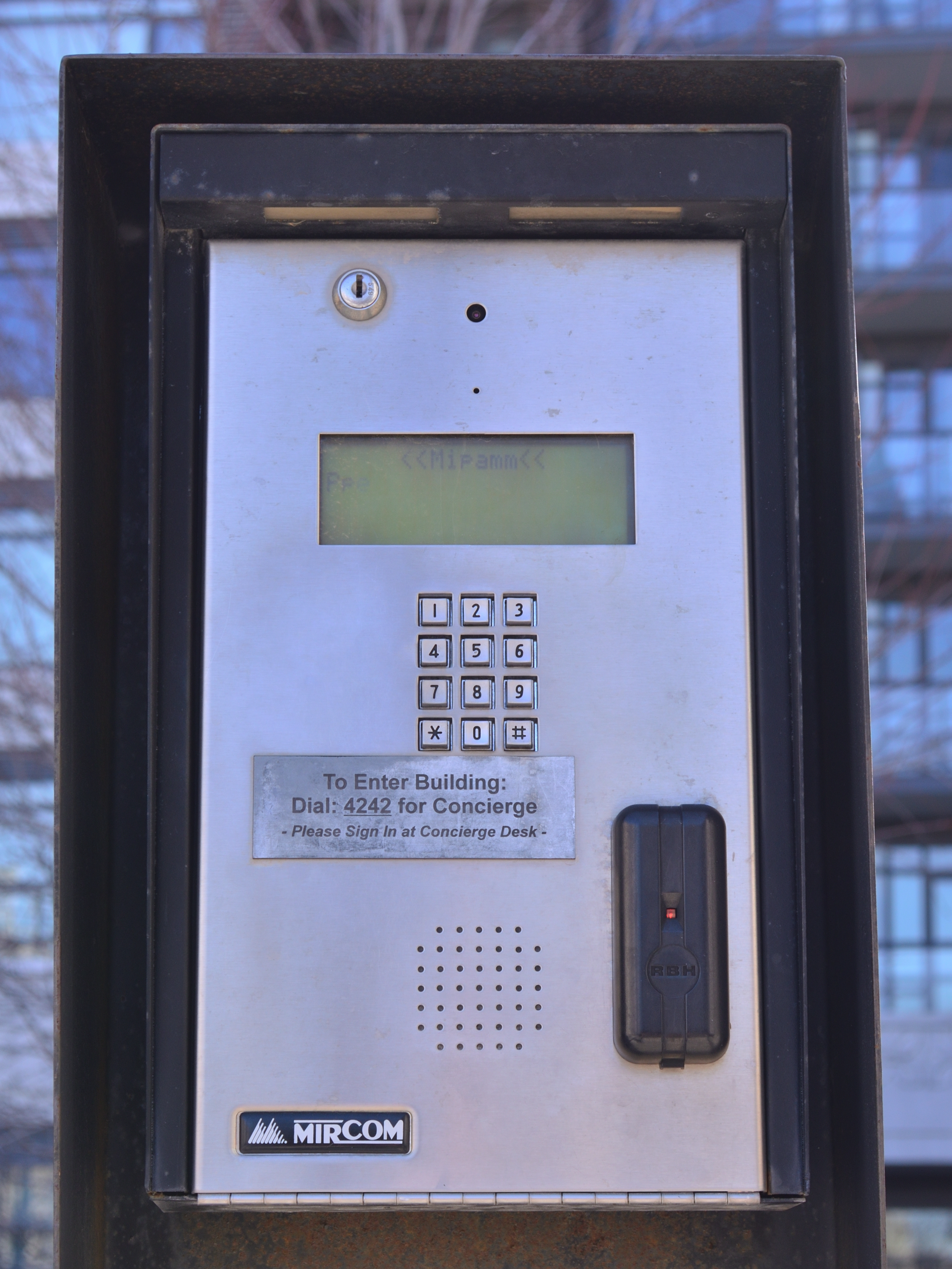
Mircom intercom

Mircom is the principal brand. Its product line is split into fire alarm, communications, security and automation systems.

=== Secutron ===
Secutron has been manufacturing fire alarm systems since 1973, including conventional and intelligent fire alarm control panels, fire alarm networks, fire and security integration systems, and fire alarm accessories.

Secutron products are approved by Underwriters Laboratories (UL), Factory Mutual (FM), California State Fire Marshal (CSFM), City of New York (MEA), US Coast Guard, Loss Prevention Certification Board (LPCB) UK and American Bureau of Shipping (ABS).

=== Summit ===
Summit Systems Technology was a global brand that focused on the requirements of low voltage system installers and electrical contractors.

== Operations ==
The Mircom Group of Companies is headquartered in Vaughan, Ontario, Canada, with regional offices located in Niagara Falls, New York, USA; Mexico City, Mexico; Buenos Aires, Argentina; Bangalore, India; Dubai, UAE; and Singapore.

Mircom employs over 500 people worldwide.

=== North American operations ===
Mircom operates a dedicated network of sales and service branch offices under its Mircom Engineered Systems service brand across North America. Mircom's US headquarters is located in Niagara Falls, New York.

==== Canadian branch locations ====
- Victoria, BC
- Maple Ridge, BC (Vancouver, BC)
- Kelowna, BC
- Calgary, AB
- Edmonton, AB
- London, ON
- Vaughan, ON
- Ottawa, ON
- Montreal, QC
- Quebec, QC
- Halifax, NS
- Moncton, NB

==== American branch locations ====
- Los Angeles, CA
- Chicago, IL
- Niagara Falls, NY
- Raleigh-Durham, NC
- Miami, FL
- Cedar Grove, NJ

=== International operations ===
MGC Systems International Limited supports the sale and installation of Mircom systems in more than 95 countries worldwide, with regional offices located in Bangalore, India and Dubai, UAE. Under its U.E.C. (United Export) service brand, Mircom distributes a range of fire protection equipment to more than 70 international markets.

==== International branch locations ====
- Mexico City, Mexico
- Buenos Aires, Argentina
- Bangalore, India
- Dubai, UAE
- Riyadh, Saudi Arabia
- Singapore, Singapore

== See also ==
- Fire alarm
- System Sensor
- Fire alarm control panel
- Manual pull station
- Emergency communication system
