= Cable locator =

Instrument used for detecting underground cables

A cable locator or cable avoidance tool (CAT) is an instrument used for detecting the presence and approximate location of buried services in advance of undertaking excavation works. It aims to avoid accidents while excavating. A number of types of detecting technology can be employed by such instruments, including use of magnetic fields, radio frequencies, signal generation, metal detectors, ground-penetrating radar and RFID.

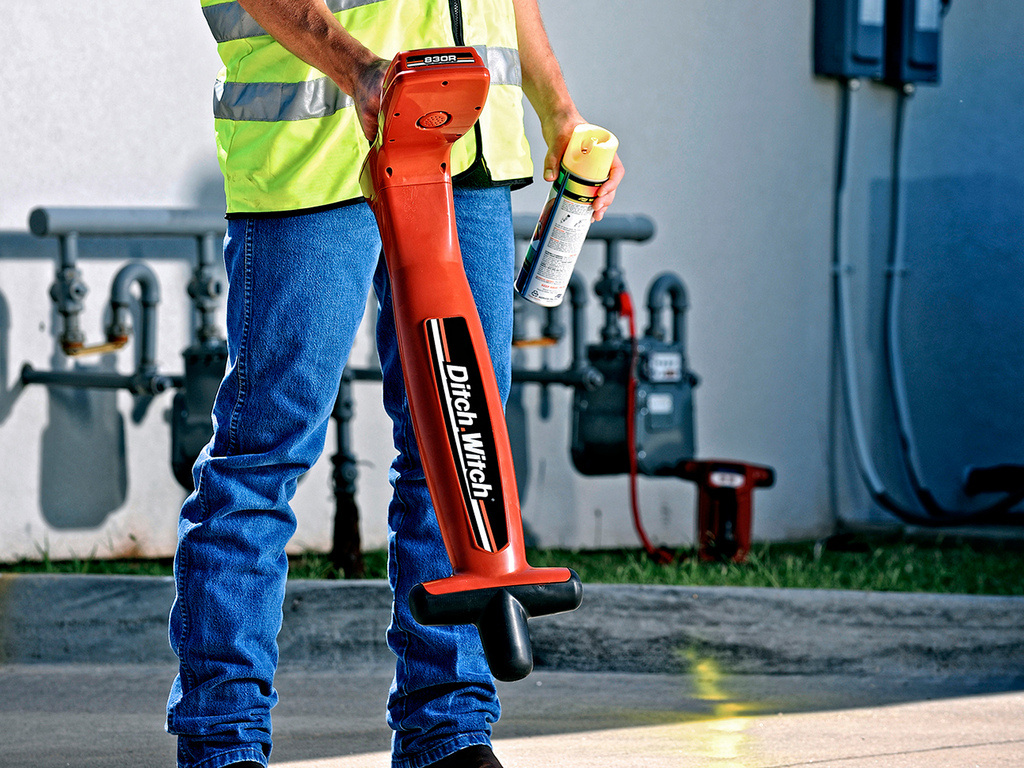
Cable locator tool in use with spray marking can for marking location

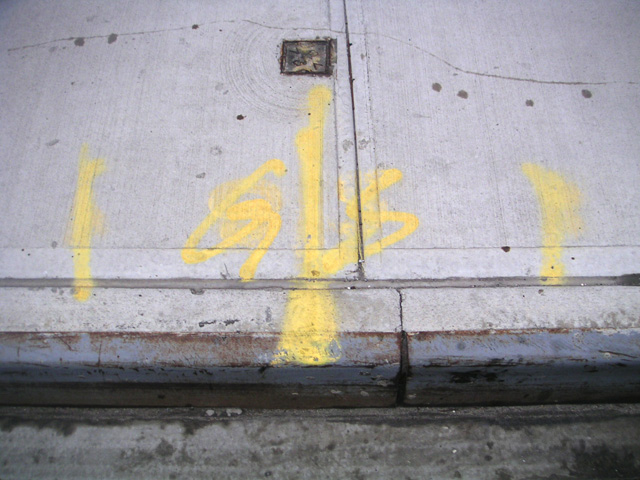
Survey marking

== Description ==
Underground cables are one of the things that enable telecommunication and power transmission. They are especially beneficial to densely populated areas, particularly those locations where overhead cable posts are unavailable or are not ideal.

Locating underground cables—as well as other underground facilities—is an integral pre-excavation process mandated by laws and guided by a number of industry standards. During excavations, underground cables become at risk of getting damaged. In fact, utility strikes are a common occurrence on construction sites, resulting in compromised worker and public safety, repair costs, and work delay, among others.

Based on the 2018 Damage Information Reporting Tool (DIRT) Report of the Common Ground Alliance (CGA), some of the most common root causes of utility strikes include failure to call 811 before digging, improper excavation practices, and inaccurate marking of underground facilities.

Furthermore, the CGA also noted that locator errors are one of the common causes of strike incidents. This emphasizes the need for understanding how cable locators work as well as how different cable types can be most accurately detected.

== Detection Methods ==
Different cable locators employ different methods to function. The two known methods, Passive Utility Detection locating naturally present or naturally produced signals known as a passive signal. The other is to locate a signal that is applied AKA an Active signal , are called the Passive Utility Detection and Active Utility Detection.

It’s important to note, however, that while both methods can help locators distinguish an underground utility, they do not confirm its presence nor its absolute location. Furthermore, an unmarked ground is not a guarantee that there are no utilities underground.
