= Grade II* listed buildings in Calderdale =

There are over 20,000 Grade II* listed buildings in England. This page is a list of these buildings in the metropolitan borough of Calderdale in West Yorkshire.

== List ==
Name	Location	Type	Completed (Note: The date given is the date used by Historic England as significant for the initial building or that of an important part in the structure's description.)	Date designated	Grid ref. (Note: Sometimes known as OSGB36, the grid reference is based on the British national grid reference system used by the Ordnance Survey.) Geo-coordinates	Entry number (Note: The "List Entry Number" is a unique number assigned to each listed building and scheduled monument by Historic England.)	Image
The Old Bridge over the Hebden Water	Hebden Bridge, Hebden Royd	Packhorse bridge	c.1510	19 July 1963	SD9921727294; 53°44′31″N 2°00′48″W	1228914	The Old Bridge over the Hebden Water More images
Barn 15 metres to north of Lower Hathershelf	Luddendenfoot, Hebden Royd	Barn	Late 16th century or early 17th century	19 July 1963	SE0262225258; 53°43′25″N 1°57′42″W	1229380	Upload Photo
Brearley Hall	Luddendenfoot, Hebden Royd	House	Late 16th century	19 July 1963	SE0303725929; 53°43′47″N 1°57′20″W	1229035	Upload Photo
Luddenden Foot United Reformed Church, the Manse and Chapel House	Luddendenfoot, Calderdale	Manse	1859	11 July 1980	SE0398424477; 53°43′00″N 1°56′28″W	1134555	Luddenden Foot United Reformed Church, the Manse and Chapel House More images
Birchen Lee Carr and attached barn	Mytholmroyd, Hebden Royd	House	Mid-17th century	19 July 1963	SE0142226694; 53°44′12″N 1°58′48″W	1230186	Upload Photo
Broad Bottom Old Hall	Mytholmroyd, Hebden Royd	House	Mid-16th century	19 July 1963	SE0078926591; 53°44′09″N 1°59′22″W	1279330	Broad Bottom Old Hall
Great Burlees	Mytholmroyd, Hebden Royd	House	Late 16th century	19 July 1963	SE0000327029; 53°44′23″N 2°00′05″W	1279349	Upload Photo
Little Burlees Farmhouse and attached barn	Mytholmroyd, Hebden Royd	House	1637	19 July 1963	SE0013727108; 53°44′25″N 1°59′58″W	1279350	Little Burlees Farmhouse and attached barn
Mytholmroyd Farmhouse	Mytholmroyd, Hebden Royd	House	Early–mid-17th century	19 July 1963	SE0123525755; 53°43′41″N 1°58′58″W	1230315	Mytholmroyd Farmhouse More images
Redacre House	Mytholmroyd, Hebden Royd	House	Late 16th century	19 July 1963	SE0118826273; 53°43′58″N 1°59′00″W	1229121	Redacre House
Stoney Royd Farmhouse	Mytholmroyd, Hebden Royd	House	1715	21 June 1984	SE0212926632; 53°44′10″N 1°58′09″W	1299703	Stoney Royd Farmhouse More images
Wadsworth Banks Farmhouse	Raw Lane, Mytholmroyd, Hebden Royd	House	17th century	19 July 1963	SE0150826763; 53°44′14″N 1°58′43″W	1278733	Wadsworth Banks Farmhouse More images
Windle Hill	Mytholmroyd, Hebden Royd	House	Late 16th century	21 June 1984	SE0132624646; 53°43′06″N 1°58′53″W	1230058	Upload Photo
Church of St Thomas	Heptonstall	Church	1850–54	1 November 1966	SD9864528006; 53°44′54″N 2°01′19″W	1226171	Church of St Thomas More images
Church of St Thomas a' Becket	Heptonstall	Church	1260	1 November 1966	SD9867528058; 53°44′56″N 2°01′18″W	1226170	Church of St Thomas a' Becket More images
Greenwood Lee	Heptonstall	Clothiers house	1712	1 November 1961	SD9703329562; 53°45′45″N 2°02′47″W	1226793	Greenwood Lee More images
Barn 10 metres to north-west of Greenwood Lee	Heptonstall	Aisled barn	Late 16th century	1 November 1966	SD9699829578; 53°45′45″N 2°02′49″W	1265719	Upload Photo
Wesleyan Methodist Chapel	Heptonstall	Wesleyan methodist chapel	c.1764	1 November 1966	SD9877128160; 53°44′59″N 2°01′12″W	1226441	Wesleyan Methodist Chapel More images
Field Head	Colden, Heptonstall	House	Late 17th century	12 December 1984	SD9538528585; 53°45′13″N 2°04′17″W	1225892	Upload Photo
Colden Great House	Colden, Heptonstall	Clothiers house	Second half of 16th century	1 November 1966	SD9595928776; 53°45′19″N 2°03′46″W	1226080	Colden Great House
Old Edge	Colden, Heptonstall	House	Early 17th century	1 November 1966	SD9563929243; 53°45′34″N 2°04′03″W	1226099	Upload Photo
Great Greave	Soyland, Ripponden	Aisled house	Late 16th century	15 August 1966	SE0177720653; 53°40′56″N 1°58′28″W	1277380	Great Greave More images
Great House	Great House Lane, Soyland, Ripponden	House	1624	15 August 1966	SE0244219262; 53°40′11″N 1°57′52″W	1278210	Upload Photo
Lower Moor Farmhouse and attached barn	Ripponden	Clothiers house	2nd quarter of 17th century	16 July 1984	SE0321420050; 53°40′37″N 1°57′10″W	1277496	Upload Photo
Ripponden Old Bridge	Ripponden	Bridge	1533	15 August 1966	SE0406219781; 53°40′28″N 1°56′24″W	1232463	Ripponden Old Bridge More images
Swift Cottage and gate piers in inner courtyard, Swift Mews & Swift Place	Rochdale Rd, Ripponden	House	1626	15 August 1966	SE0264418888; 53°39′59″N 1°57′41″W	1277094	Upload Photo
Upper Cockcroft	Rishworth, Ripponden	House	1642	15 August 1966	SE0239618091; 53°39′33″N 1°57′55″W	1277194	Upper Cockcroft
Upper Cockcroft Farmhouse	Rishworth, Ripponden	House	1607	15 August 1966	SE0241718101; 53°39′34″N 1°57′54″W	1231972	Upper Cockcroft Farmhouse
Wormald Farmhouse	Barkisland, Ripponden	House	Mid-17th century	12 October 1978	SE0602018985; 53°40′02″N 1°54′37″W	1231233	Wormald Farmhouse More images
Bean Hole Head Farmhouse and attached Barn	Todmorden	House	1638	22 November 1966	SD9501624961; 53°43′16″N 2°04′37″W	1133763	Bean Hole Head Farmhouse and attached Barn More images
Dobroyd Castle	Todmorden	Country house	1866–69	22 November 1966	SD9296223809; 53°42′38″N 2°06′29″W	1134570	Dobroyd Castle More images
Higher Ashes Farmhouse	Todmorden	Clothiers house	1691	22 November 1966	SD9481425402; 53°43′30″N 2°04′48″W	1133774	Upload Photo
Lower Ashes Farmhouse and attached gate piers	Todmorden	House	1610	26 November 1966	SD9494225318; 53°43′27″N 2°04′41″W	1133773	Upload Photo
Lower East Lee and attached barn	Todmorden	Farmhouse	1610	22 November 1966	SD9601225461; 53°43′32″N 2°03′43″W	1134577	Upload Photo
Stansfield Hall	Todmorden	House	1640	19 April 1974	SD9407524675; 53°43′06″N 2°05′29″W	1230848	Upload Photo
Steanor Bottom Toll House	Todmorden	Toll house	1824	22 November 1966	SD9451619835; 53°40′30″N 2°05′04″W	1230648	Steanor Bottom Toll House More images
Swallowshaw and attached barn	Todmorden	Clothiers house	1663	22 November 1966	SD9503425660; 53°43′38″N 2°04′36″W	1134568	Swallowshaw and attached barn More images
Todmorden Hall	Todmorden	House	Early 17th century	5 May 1972	SD9354424085; 53°42′47″N 2°05′57″W	1228983	Todmorden Hall More images
Upper Shaw	Langfield, Todmorden	Farmhouse	Mid-17th century	22 November 1966	SD9599324256; 53°42′53″N 2°03′44″W	1278750	Upload Photo
Woodhouse Mill, engine house and detached chimney 20 metres to south	Todmorden	Steam mill	1832	22 February 1984	SD9515324438; 53°42′59″N 2°04′30″W	1278321	Woodhouse Mill, engine house and detached chimney 20 metres to south More images
Akroyd Farm Cottage/Akroyd Farmhouse	Pecket Well, Wadsworth	Clothiers house	Late 17th century	1 November 1966	SD9958429157; 53°45′32″N 2°00′28″W	1226935	Akroyd Farm Cottage/Akroyd Farmhouse More images
Wainsgate Baptist Church and attached Sunday School	Wadsworth	Sunday school	1859	29 April 1982	SD9982828798; 53°45′20″N 2°00′15″W	1227399	Wainsgate Baptist Church and attached Sunday School More images
6 cast-iron urns on pedestals to terrace in People's Park	Halifax	Urn	c.1856	23 November 1973	SE0843824942; 53°43′15″N 1°52′25″W	1242836	6 cast-iron urns on pedestals to terrace in People's Park
8 statues to terrace in People's Park	Halifax	Statue	c.1856	23 November 1973	SE0843924925; 53°43′14″N 1°52′25″W	1261517	8 statues to terrace in People's Park
Fountain and basin in People's Park	Halifax	Fountain	c.1856	23 November 1973	SE0851624875; 53°43′13″N 1°52′21″W	1254010	Fountain and basin in People's Park More images
Steps to centre of terrace in People's Park	Halifax	Steps	c.1856	23 November 1973	SE0846324870; 53°43′13″N 1°52′24″W	1261518	Steps to centre of terrace in People's Park More images
Northern bridge in People's Park	Halifax	Footbridge	c.1856	23 November 1973	SE0856724930; 53°43′15″N 1°52′18″W	1254014	Northern bridge in People's Park More images
Southern bridge in People's Park	Halifax	Bridge	c.1856	23 November 1973	SE0858824868; 53°43′13″N 1°52′17″W	1254015	Upload Photo
Pavilion with screen walls and fountain pools in People's Park	Halifax	Pavilion	c.1856	23 November 1973	SE0842824868; 53°43′13″N 1°52′26″W	1242770	Pavilion with screen walls and fountain pools in People's Park More images
Platform at north end of terrace with urn in People's Park	Halifax	Balustrade	c.1856	23 November 1973	SE0843024965; 53°43′16″N 1°52′25″W	1254008	Upload Photo
Platform at south end of terrace with urn in People's Park	Halifax	Balustrade	c.1856	23 November 1973	SE0844624772; 53°43′09″N 1°52′25″W	1242811	Upload Photo
Allangate	Halifax	Country house	c.1810	14 December 1992	SE0739324303; 53°42′54″N 1°53′22″W	1330019	Upload Photo
Somerset House	Halifax	Detached house	1766	3 November 1954	SE0916325082; 53°43′19″N 1°51′45″W	1133901	Somerset House More images
Staups House	George St, Halifax	House	1664	3 November 1954	SE1063026389; 53°44′02″N 1°50′25″W	1261494	Staups House More images
Steeple of Square Congregational Church	Halifax	Church	1855	2 March 1950	SE0961325064; 53°43′19″N 1°51′21″W	1258888	Steeple of Square Congregational Church More images
White Swan Hotel	Halifax	Hotel	1858	31 July 1963	SE0929325268; 53°43′25″N 1°51′38″W	1258062	White Swan Hotel More images
1 Woolshops	Halifax	Jettied house	Late 16th century to early 17th century	3 November 1954	SE0939425235; 53°43′24″N 1°51′33″W	1272942	1 Woolshops More images
Town Hall	Halifax	Town hall	1863	31 July 1963	SE0928725345; 53°43′28″N 1°51′39″W	1314024	Town Hall More images
Wainhouse Tower	Halifax	Belvedere	1871–75	3 November 1954	SE0781023999; 53°42′44″N 1°52′59″W	1133900	Wainhouse Tower More images
Shaw Lodge Mill chimney	Halifax	Textile mill	1855	3 April 2007	SE0971224235; 53°42′52″N 1°51′16″W	1391916	Shaw Lodge Mill chimney More images
Shaw Lodge Mill engine house and boiler house	Halifax	Boiler house	1855	3 April 2007	SE0973324151; 53°42′49″N 1°51′14″W	1391915	Shaw Lodge Mill engine house and boiler house More images
Shaw Lodge Mill former combing shed	Halifax	Fireproof building	1876	3 April 2007	SE0966624278; 53°42′53″N 1°51′18″W	1391913	Upload Photo
Shaw Lodge Mill office building	Halifax	Textile mill	1865	3 April 2007	SE0962424250; 53°42′52″N 1°51′20″W	1391914	Shaw Lodge Mill office building
Shaw Lodge Mill warehouse and mills	Halifax	Spinning mill	1830	3 April 2007	SE0970324197; 53°42′51″N 1°51′16″W	1391936	Upload Photo
Shaw Lodge Mill weaving sheds and clock tower	Halifax	Worsted mill	1876	3 April 2007	SE0965824060; 53°42′46″N 1°51′19″W	1391911	Shaw Lodge Mill weaving sheds and clock tower
Coley Hall	Hipperholme	House	Late 17th century	3 January 1967	SE1291226942; 53°44′19″N 1°48′21″W	1183818	Coley Hall More images
Archway to Coley Hall	Hipperholme	Gate	1649	3 January 1967	SE1290726905; 53°44′18″N 1°48′21″W	1133869	Archway to Coley Hall
Bank House	Salterhebble	House	17th century and earlier	3 November 1954	SE0955022595; 53°41′59″N 1°51′25″W	1313994	Bank House More images
Shibden Hall Museum	Shibden Park, Shibden	House	Later 16th century	3 November 1954	SE1066925750; 53°43′41″N 1°50′23″W	1254036	Shibden Hall Museum More images
Barn to Shibden Hall Museum	Shibden Park, Shibden	Museum	Early 17th century	3 November 1954	SE1065625774; 53°43′42″N 1°50′24″W	1254037	Barn to Shibden Hall Museum More images
Belle Vue (public Library)	Halifax	House	Early 19th century	3 November 1954	SE0845925068; 53°43′19″N 1°52′24″W	1133879	Belle Vue (public Library) More images
Borough Market with Shopping Arcade to North	Halifax	Market hall	1891–95	23 November 1973	SE0937425122; 53°43′21″N 1°51′34″W	1281516	Borough Market with Shopping Arcade to North More images
2–5 Backhold Lane	Halifax	House	17th century	3 November 1954	SE1011423043; 53°42′13″N 1°50′54″W	1314032	Upload Photo
Congregational Sunday School	Halifax	Sunday school	1772	3 November 1954	SE0962425035; 53°43′18″N 1°51′20″W	1254043	Congregational Sunday School More images
Church of St Paul	King Cross, Halifax	Church	1911–12	23 November 1973	SE0802024478; 53°43′00″N 1°52′48″W	1258113	Church of St Paul More images
Church of St Matthew	Rastrick	Church	c.1796	3 January 1967	SE1385421578; 53°41′26″N 1°47′30″W	1183810	Church of St Matthew More images
Cross base in churchyard of St Matthew's Church	Rastrick	Cross	10th century	3 January 1967	SE1383121596; 53°41′26″N 1°47′31″W	1314049	Cross base in churchyard of St Matthew's Church More images
Church of All Saints	Elland	Church	1896	6 June 1983	SE1075020462; 53°40′50″N 1°50′19″W	1133954	Church of All Saints More images
The Fleece Inn	Elland	House	Early 17th century	24 January 1968	SE1055220998; 53°41′07″N 1°50′30″W	1313985	The Fleece Inn More images
Sunny Bank	Elland	House	17th century	24 January 1968	SE0879321204; 53°41′14″N 1°52′06″W	1133970	Sunny Bank
Church of St Stephen	Greetland, Elland	Church	1863	6 June 1983	SE0847322321; 53°41′50″N 1°52′23″W	1133985	Church of St Stephen More images
Clay House	Greetland, Elland	Apartment	c.1650	24 January 1968	SE0974821445; 53°41′22″N 1°51′14″W	1184835	Clay House More images
Clay House Barn	Elland	Aisled barn	17th century	15 November 1977	SE0977621470; 53°41′23″N 1°51′12″W	1133992	Clay House Barn More images
Field House	Sowerby	House	1749	15 November 1966	SE0415422639; 53°42′01″N 1°56′19″W	1313736	Field House More images
The Wet Dock	Sowerby Bridge Canal Basin, Sowerby	Canal	c.1775	17 October 1975	SE0653223713; 53°42′35″N 1°54′09″W	1313744	Upload Photo
52 and 54 Town Gate	Sowerby	House	1662	15 November 1966	SE0399423283; 53°42′21″N 1°56′28″W	1319946	52 and 54 Town Gate More images
Former lockup	Illingworth, Calderdale	House	1823	3 November 1954	SE0707728395; 53°45′07″N 1°53′39″W	1314017	Former lockup More images
Giles House	Brighouse	House	1655	3 January 1967	SE1347224594; 53°43′03″N 1°47′50″W	1300213	Giles House
Haugh End House	Sowerby	House	Mid-18th century	16 November 1966	SE0528623104; 53°42′16″N 1°55′17″W	1184180	Haugh End House
Highley Hall and Barn	Clifton	House	1632	3 January 1967	SE1595722979; 53°42′11″N 1°45′35″W	1314067	Highley Hall and Barn More images
Holdsworth House with wall and gateway to forecourt	Calderdale	House	1633	3 November 1954	SE0832229052; 53°45′28″N 1°52′31″W	1133873	Holdsworth House with wall and gateway to forecourt More images
Gazebo to Holdsworth House	Calderdale	Gazebo	17th century	3 November 1954	SE0828529038; 53°45′27″N 1°52′33″W	1133874	Upload Photo
Lower Field Bottom Farmhouse	Shelf	House	Late 15th century	9 August 1966	SE1244627423; 53°44′35″N 1°48′46″W	1314057	Upload Photo
Lower Fold Farmhouse	Shelf	House	Mid-17th century	1 November 1956	SE1320328484; 53°45′09″N 1°48′05″W	1133767	Upload Photo
Lower Old Hall and Lower Old Hall Cottage	Norland	House	1634	15 November 1966	SE0693122973; 53°42′11″N 1°53′47″W	1184892	Lower Old Hall and Lower Old Hall Cottage More images
Lumb Mill	Wainstalls	Cotton mill	1803	20 May 1998	SE0470428866; 53°45′22″N 1°55′48″W	1119751	Lumb Mill More images
Marlborough Hall	Halifax	Shop	Mid/later 19th century	23 November 1973	SE0926925268; 53°43′25″N 1°51′40″W	1314023	Marlborough Hall More images
Marsh Hall	Northowram	House	Dated 1626	3 November 1954	SE1082427839; 53°44′49″N 1°50′14″W	1203782	Marsh Hall More images
Mount Sion Methodist Church and House attached	Illingworth	Chapel	1773	23 November 1973	SE0680329695; 53°45′49″N 1°53′54″W	1254018	Mount Sion Methodist Church and House attached More images
No. 39, Albany Club and two pairs of gate piers to forecourt	Halifax	House	Mid/Later 18th century	3 November 1954	SE0945424682; 53°43′06″N 1°51′30″W	1314020	No. 39, Albany Club and two pairs of gate piers to forecourt
Old Lane Mill, or Rawson's Mill	Halifax	Fireproof factory	1825–28	12 April 1994	SE0861726341; 53°44′00″N 1°52′15″W	1244144	Old Lane Mill, or Rawson's Mill More images
Former boiler house and attached chimney to north of Old Lane Mill	Halifax	Boiler house	1827–28	12 April 1994	SE0860826394; 53°44′02″N 1°52′16″W	1272533	Former boiler house and attached chimney to north of Old Lane Mill More images
Ovenden Hall	Ovenden	House	Later 17th century	3 November 1954	SE0827527022; 53°44′22″N 1°52′34″W	1242456	Ovenden Hall
Scout Hall	Calderdale	House	Later 17th century	3 November 1954	SE0949927708; 53°44′44″N 1°51′27″W	1203783	Scout Hall More images
Two-cell house, Home Farm building number 6	Kirklees Park	House	Early 17th century	3 January 1967	SE1743122202; 53°41′45″N 1°44′15″W	1314059	Two-cell house, Home Farm building number 6
Home Farm building number 7, L-shaped aisled barn	Kirklees Park	Cow house	Early 16th century	3 January 1967	SE1745222190; 53°41′45″N 1°44′14″W	1133808	Upload Photo
Kirklees Priory Gatehouse	Kirklees Park	Gatehouse	Early 16th century	3 January 1967	SE1745022110; 53°41′43″N 1°44′14″W	1314039	Kirklees Priory Gatehouse More images
Single-aisled cow house	Kirklees Park	Cow house	Early 17th century	3 January 1967	SE1746222159; 53°41′44″N 1°44′13″W	1133805	Upload Photo
Well Head	Halifax	House	Later 18th century	3 November 1954	SE0909224535; 53°43′02″N 1°51′49″W	1259124	Upload Photo
1 and 3 Upper Green Lane	Calderdale	House	Late 17th century	2 December 1983	SE1351024315; 53°42′54″N 1°47′48″W	1314090	Upload Photo

== See also ==
- Grade I listed buildings in West Yorkshire
- Grade II* listed buildings in West Yorkshire
  - Grade II* listed buildings in Bradford
  - Grade II* listed buildings in Kirklees
  - Grade II* listed buildings in Leeds
  - Grade II* listed buildings in Wakefield
