= Halifax Town Hall =

Municipal building in West Yorkshire, England

Coordinates: 53°43′28″N 1°51′38″W

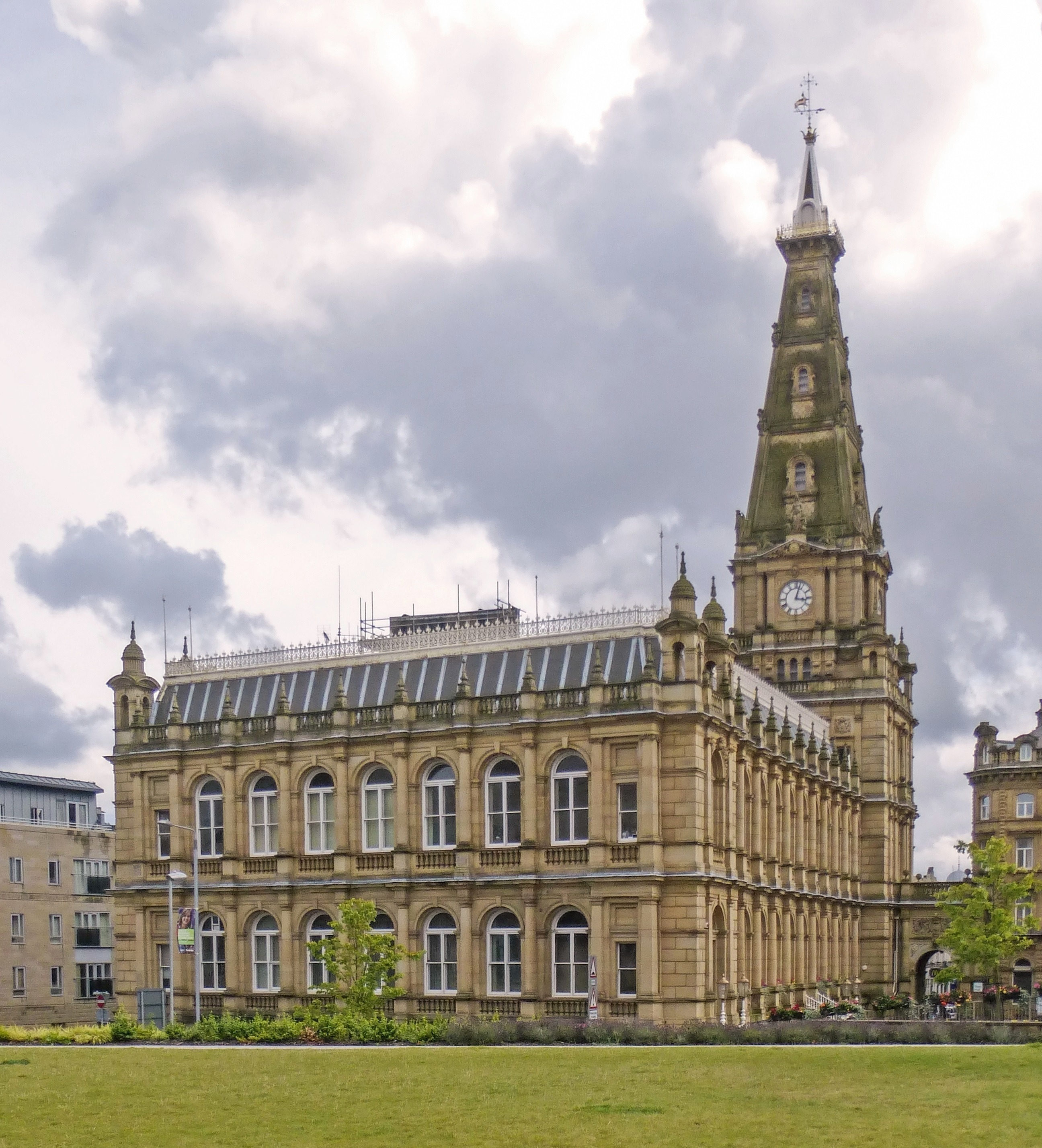
- Viewed from the north
- Interactive map of the Halifax Town Hall area

General information
- Architectural style: Classical style
- Classification

Listed Building – Grade II*
- Designated: 31 July 1963
- Reference no.: 1314024
- Location: Halifax, England
- Construction started: 1861
- Completed: 1863
- Cost: £50,126
- Client: Halifax Corporation

Height
- Height: 180 feet (55 m)

Technical details
- Structural system: Sandstone

Design and construction
- Architects: Charles Barry; Edward Middleton Barry

Halifax Town Hall is a 19th-century town hall in Halifax, West Yorkshire, England. It is a grade II* listed building. It is notable for its design and interiors by Charles Barry and his son, Edward Middleton Barry, and for its sculptures by John Thomas. The town hall is the headquarters of Calderdale Metropolitan Borough Council.

== History ==
The Mayor and corporation first proposed that they build a new town hall in 1847. They suggested it again in 1853 after the town had become a municipal borough five years earlier but still had no central offices. They proposed it again in 1856. The later proposals were prompted by the 1853 Improvement Act, which allowed the borough to borrow £15,000 to build a town hall, courthouse and police station. The 1856 proposal was also prompted by John Crossley, who was at that time developing Princess Street and Crossley Street, using the architects Lockwood and Mawson who later designed Bradford City Hall. This may explain why the town hall blends in with several Crossley Street buildings, which are now listed as a group.

The council, Edward Akroyd and John Crossley requested that Charles Barry judge the design entries; he disliked all three entries and was asked in turn to submit his own design. His design was accepted, but he died in 1860. His son, Edward Middleton Barry, completed the design which was erected on a 148 x 90 ft plot on John Crossley's land. The foundation stone was laid in 1861. Whiteley Brothers were the builders. It was listed on 31 July 1963.

=== Opening ===
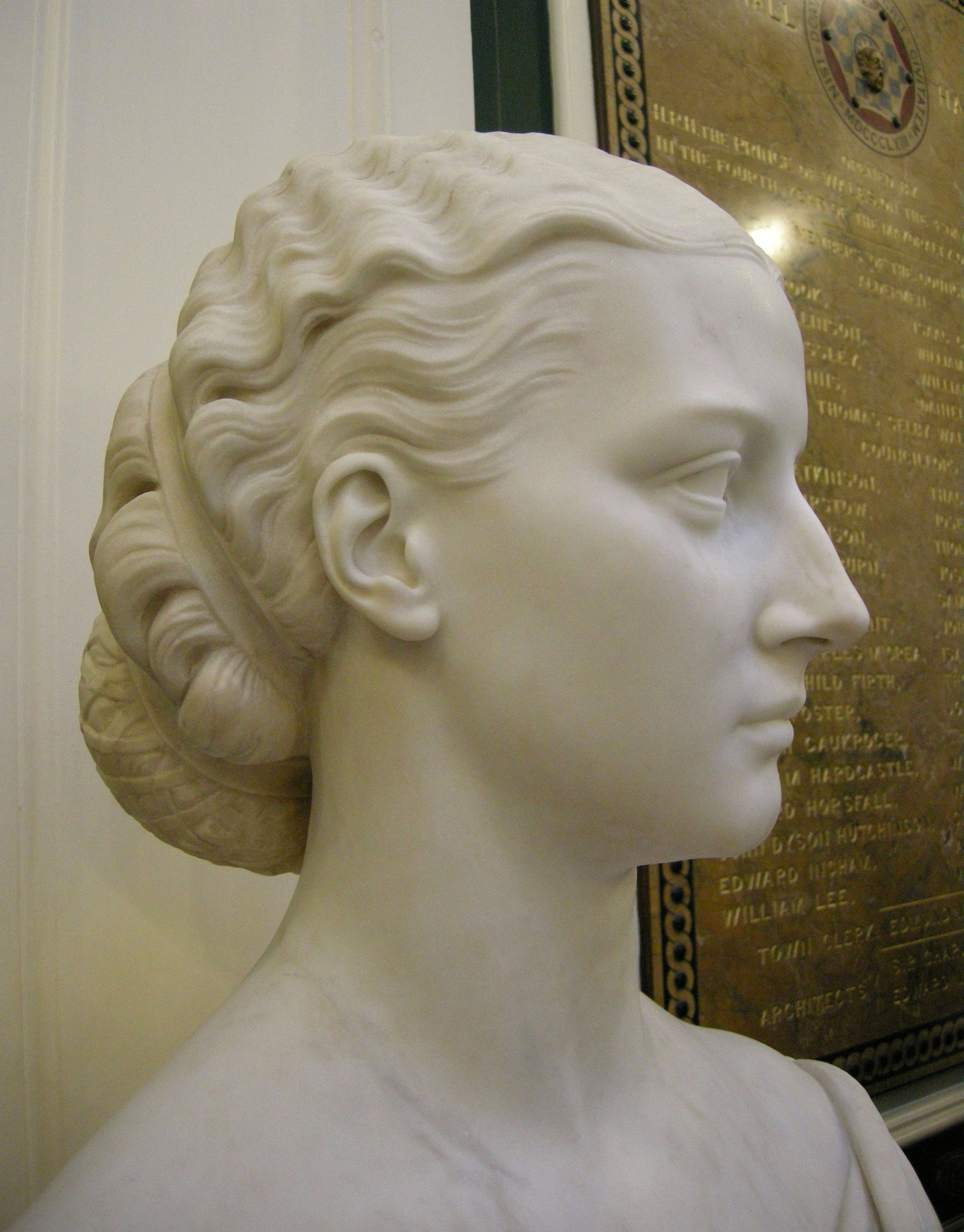
Alexandra, Princess of Wales, 1863

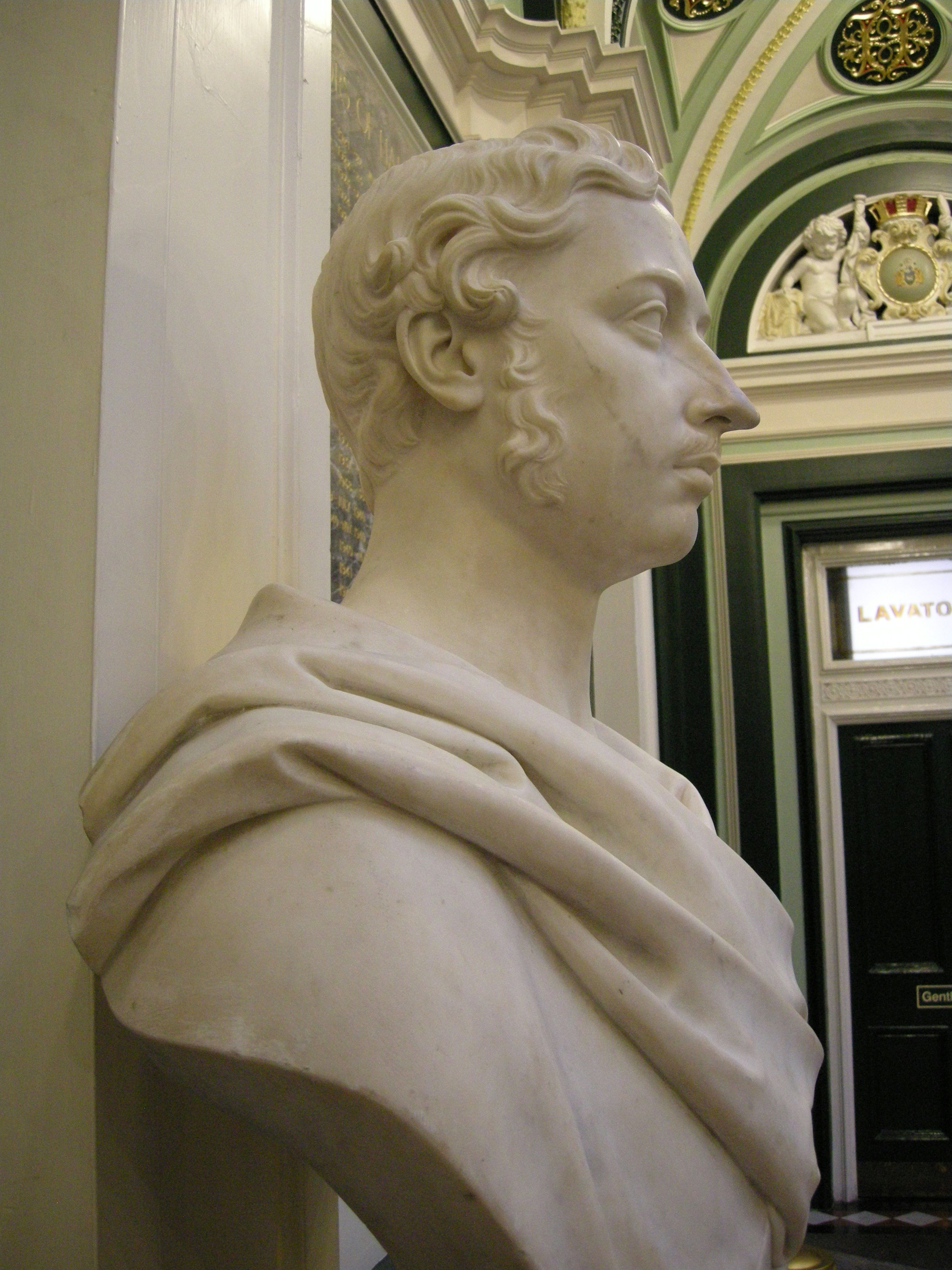
Prince Edward, Prince of Wales, 1863

Three hundred and fifty-eight trains brought 70,000 people, and thousands more walked, to attend a two-day session of openings and visits in Halifax by Prince Albert Edward (the future King Edward VII) on 3 and 4 August 1863. There was a grand procession to the town hall on 4 August, through decorated streets. This was followed by a service in the Piece Hall at which thousands of children sang hymns while 870 police controlled the crowd. Perhaps Victoria herself might have opened the town hall, but for her widowhood in 1861 and her subsequent retirement from public life. Edward was 22 years old and had married the 18-year-old Princess Alexandra in March of that year. However, by 4 August, she was four months pregnant with the future Duke of Clarence, pleaded illness and did not join her husband for the opening, to much public disappointment. It rained:

"Even though shorn of its principal attraction through the unfortunate absence of the Princess of Wales, and though dimmed as regards its pomp and circumstance owing to the rain which fell at so very inconvenient a time, the opening of the new town hall by the Prince of Wales is still an event of which Halifax may well be proud ... The enthusiasm and almost unbounded devotion of a people to their future monarch has been symbolised in every form of decorative skill and beauty, by gay banners, many coloured flags and the ornamentations of the designers, vying with nature, ever profuse in her lovely gifts, to form floral designs of the most varied, chaste and unique description. Our very streets were redolent with the fragrance of the flower garden ... The rain began to fall somewhat heavily by eleven o'clock on Monday night and, as far as we can learn, continued to fall all night. From a very early hour in the morning it descended literally in torrents, ceaselessly, pitilessly. It would be impossible to calculate the amount of real misery experienced here." Halifax Courier, August 1863.

When Edward arrived by royal train on 3 August, he was greeted with a salute by two guns on Beacon Hill, and a guard of honour comprising 300 soldiers. There was a banquet at Manor Heath, where 100 people serenaded him in the rain, then there was a balloon ascent and a firework display. Hundreds of men had to be drafted in to control crowds arriving at Halifax railway station, and more were placed along the line to control the hundreds of extra trains. When the town hall was opened to the public on 11 August, the mayor presented four marble busts of Victoria, Albert, Edward, and Alexandra. These were put in storage from 1954 after redecoration and restored to public view on 6 September 2008.

=== Town hall today ===
King George VI and Queen Elizabeth visited the town hall in October 1937 and met civic leaders. In 1958, the film Room at the Top was filmed in the town hall, at All Souls' Church and at Halifax railway station. In 1994–95 the offices on the ground floor were double-glazed. In 2006–07 the carved, wooden Overgate Hospice panel was presented to the town hall by local woodcarvers. In 2008 the town hall was judged one of the ten most spectacular in Britain by Architecture Today magazine. Groups can visit the town hall by arrangement.

== Description ==
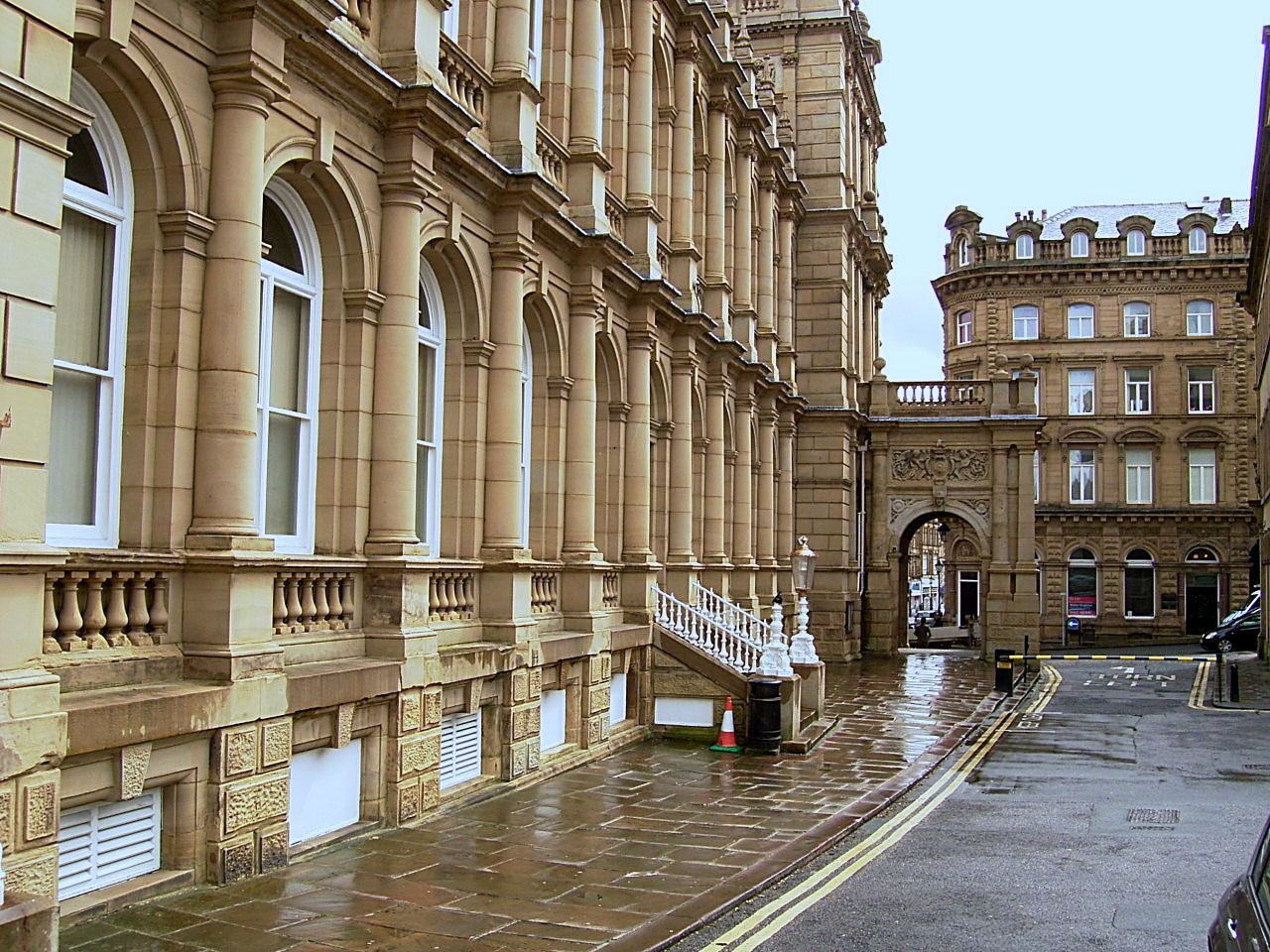
West elevation

=== Exterior ===
==== Structure ====
The building is detached and built of sandstone in the classical style, with a tower and steeple at the corner. There is a rusticated basement and two storeys above with arcades, columns and arches. Around the top of the walls there is a balustrade with finials. There is a metal roof with skylights. The steeple is 180 feet high, metal-covered and decorated by John Thomas with statues representing the four continents. The entrance has a porch with an arch and balustrade with ball finials. The other entrances on the west side have old iron lamp standards and new lanterns, and one has an iron balustrade. This building should be understood in the context of the whole group of buildings in Crossley Street, which are all listed.

24,000 tons of local Ringby sandstone from Swales Moor was used for the building. The portico has the old Halifax coat of arms over its arches, with the heads of Wisdom, Justice and Mercy.

==== Tower and spire ====
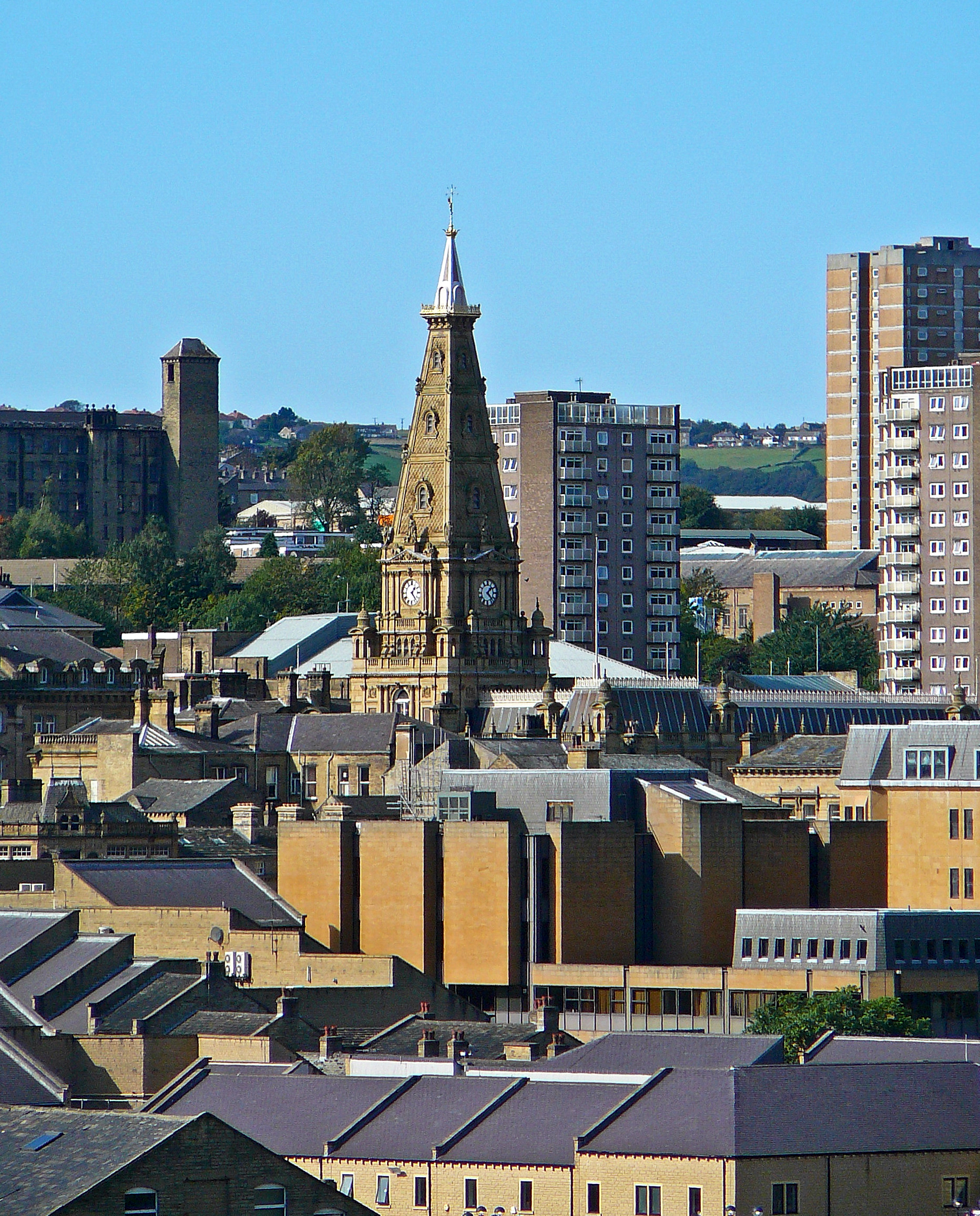
The spire within Halifax's townscape

This structure is 180 feet (55 m) high, with a carved tile effect on the stone of spire. It features four statues by John Thomas representing continents: Africa faces away from Crossley Street and consists of an ancient Egyptian and two boys; North America, above the tower portico, is a Native American with two small figures holding a paddle and a roll of tobacco; Europe, at the front of the tower in Crossley Street, has emblems of civilisation and refinement. After sculpting these, Thomas died, and Asia was carved under the supervision of Daniel Maclise. Asia faces down Crossley Street, on the opposite side of the tower from the portico, and is a figure with a Chinese boy and tea chest and a child with flowers. On the corners of the spire are four seven-foot angels.

==== Clock and bells ====
The tower contains five bells by John Taylor & Co of Loughborough, the largest of which weighs 3 tons. The bells have not rung at night since 1918 when Dame Nellie Melba complained that they disturbed her at Halifax's Princess Hotel.

A chiming clock was installed in the tower by John Moore & Sons of Clerkenwell in 1863; this was replaced by a new Cambridge-chiming clock by Potts & Sons of Leeds in 1922, which was converted to automatic winding in 1965; prior to this date the clocks had been hand-wound for over a century. The four clock faces have mottos carved over them, such as "Delay not to do well".

=== Interior ===
Victoria Hall: a glass-roofed atrium

Inside there is a branching staircase; one wall painting is by Daniel Maclise who had previously worked with Charles Barry on the House of Commons, and two are by J. C. Worsley. The main hall is galleried with a stained glass roof. The council chamber was built in c. 1900 in the upper half of the old magistrates' court. The Victoria Hall has mosaic flooring and ornate plasterwork. The hall was last decorated in 1996.

==== Victoria Hall ====
This is 51-foot (16 m) by 43-foot (13 m) by 43-foot (13 m) high. The building's mansard roof incorporates a twelve-sectioned blue and green glass ceiling, surrounded by yellow painted glass coving, for this room.

===== Ground floor =====
The ground floor is paved with stone, encaustic tiles and marble. The old Halifax coat of arms is carved on the walls, and the new, College-of-Heralds-approved 1948 coat of arms appears in mosaic on the floor. There are plaques listing mayors, freemen, town clerks and recorders on the walls, and the room contains the Prince of Wales chair, made for the future Edward VII in 1863, carved with the Royal coat of arms of the United Kingdom and Halifax arms. The Calderdale coat of arms is carved above the doors, and above the doors painted ribs connect with the gallery balustrade above. The Committee Room with its decorated plaster ceiling leads off the ground floor hall.

===== Gallery and upper hall =====
The balustrade is decorated with ironwork and the face of John the Baptist, because Halifax possibly means "holy face". There is a second gallery of doorways here, with decorative plaster panels above, and fluted pilasters between. There are repetitions of the "H" motif. Between the tops of the doors and the glass ceiling coving are cherubs supporting devices for England, Northern Ireland, Scotland and Wales. One wall is mirrored to make the hall look longer, and all the arches have carvings above, representing the industry, the arts and law. There are photographs of past and present mayors of Calderdale on the wall.

==== Council chamber ====
Council chamber, 1901

This leads off the gallery and was built over the high court room in 1901, taking the upper half of the room and its original stained glass ceiling. The centre of the glass ceiling has the pre-1948 coat of arms and, round the edge, are the four parts of the Royal Standard of the United Kingdom. The glass coving contains panels on the themes of justice and industry. The Coat of arms of Calderdale is on the wall above the mayoral chair.

The mahogany fittings date from 1901, and include carved chairs for mayor and aldermen. It was last redecorated in 1997. The art nouveau stained glass door panels feature the "holy face" motif, as on the balustrade ironwork in the Victoria Hall, but in this case the face is of Viking appearance, perhaps reflecting the 19th century Viking revival and the perceived local genetic legacy.

==== Staircase ====
Entrance stairwell

The staircase is lit by daylight through the blue glass dome above, but the tower, spire and bell chamber are adjacent; the bells resonate powerfully in the stairwell. There is ornamental plasterwork including gilt lion-heads on the second landing and arches around the three paintings on the first landing. These paintings, by J. C. Horsley and Daniel Maclise, were presented by Sir Savile Crossley in 1911, the coronation year of George V. The Maclise painting has an Arthurian theme, perhaps emphasising the moral connection made at the time between gothic revivalism and chivalry of local government. The lift beside the staircase contains doors at right angles to each other, due to awkward access.

==== Mayor's Parlour ====
Accessed from the Victoria Hall gallery, this was originally designed as a reception room, so it has a grand, pink-painted, coffered ceiling, last painted in 1997. It is now the mayor's office and contains two oak mayoral chairs by Jackson of Coley, 1958 and 1960. The mace on the table came from Brighouse Town Hall after the council reorganisation of 1974. Some of the Calderdale official silver is displayed in this room, and it is carpeted by Sir John Crossley and Sons Ltd, because the company's namesake originally provided the land for the town hall, and financial backing. This room can sometimes be seen by appointment.

==== Committee room D ====
This is next door to the Mayor's Parlour, and contains another pink, decorative ceiling, because it was originally designed as the council chamber. It was last decorated in 1997.

==== Basement ====
This was the police station and cells until 1900, when premises in Harrison Road became the police station. Now the basement contains store rooms, strong room and staff canteen, although original Victorian cell doors are still present. The present strong room was the Air Raid Precautions control room in the Second World War. The basement is not open to the public.

== Picture gallery ==
Exterior

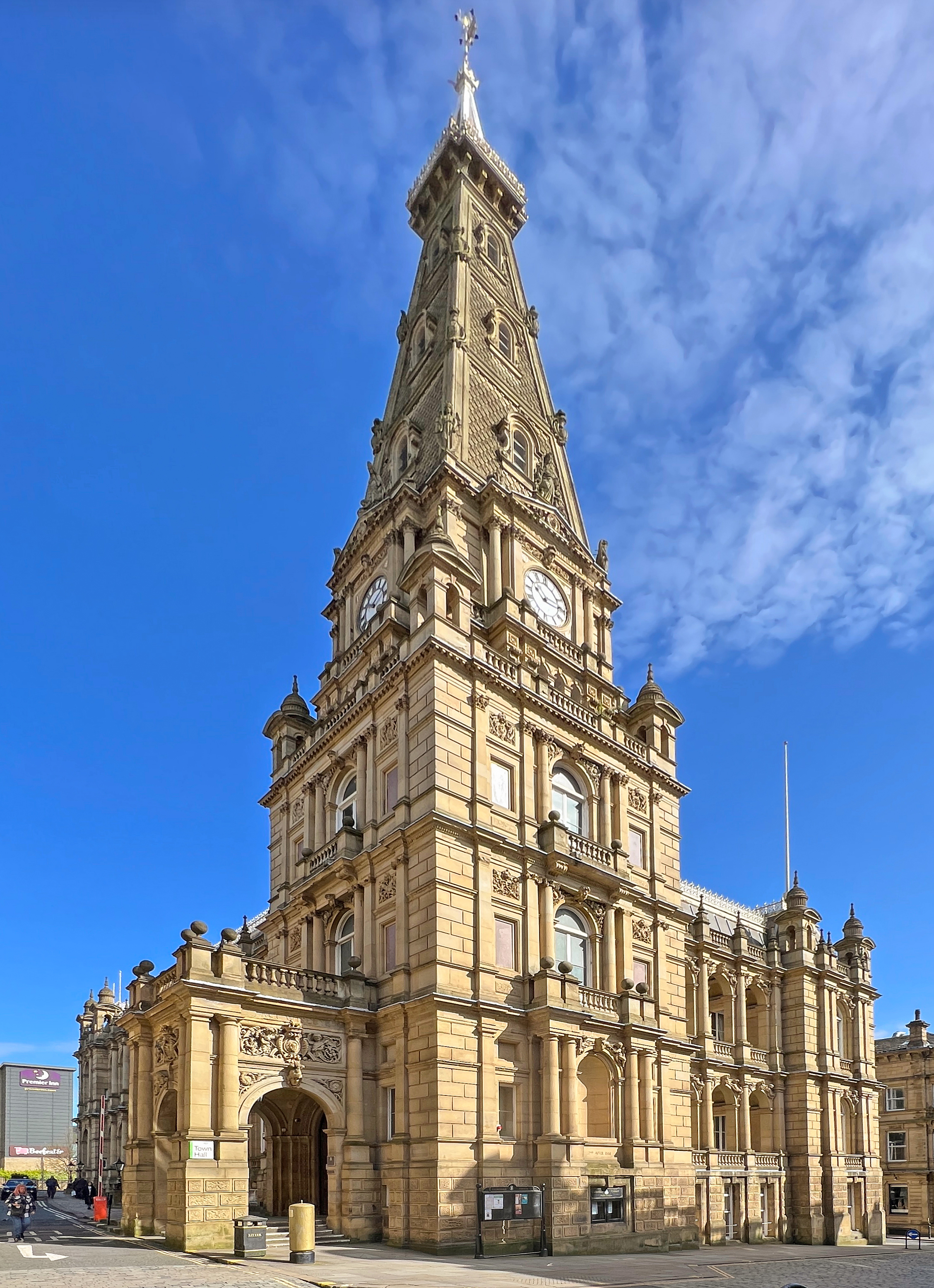
Main front on Crossley Street

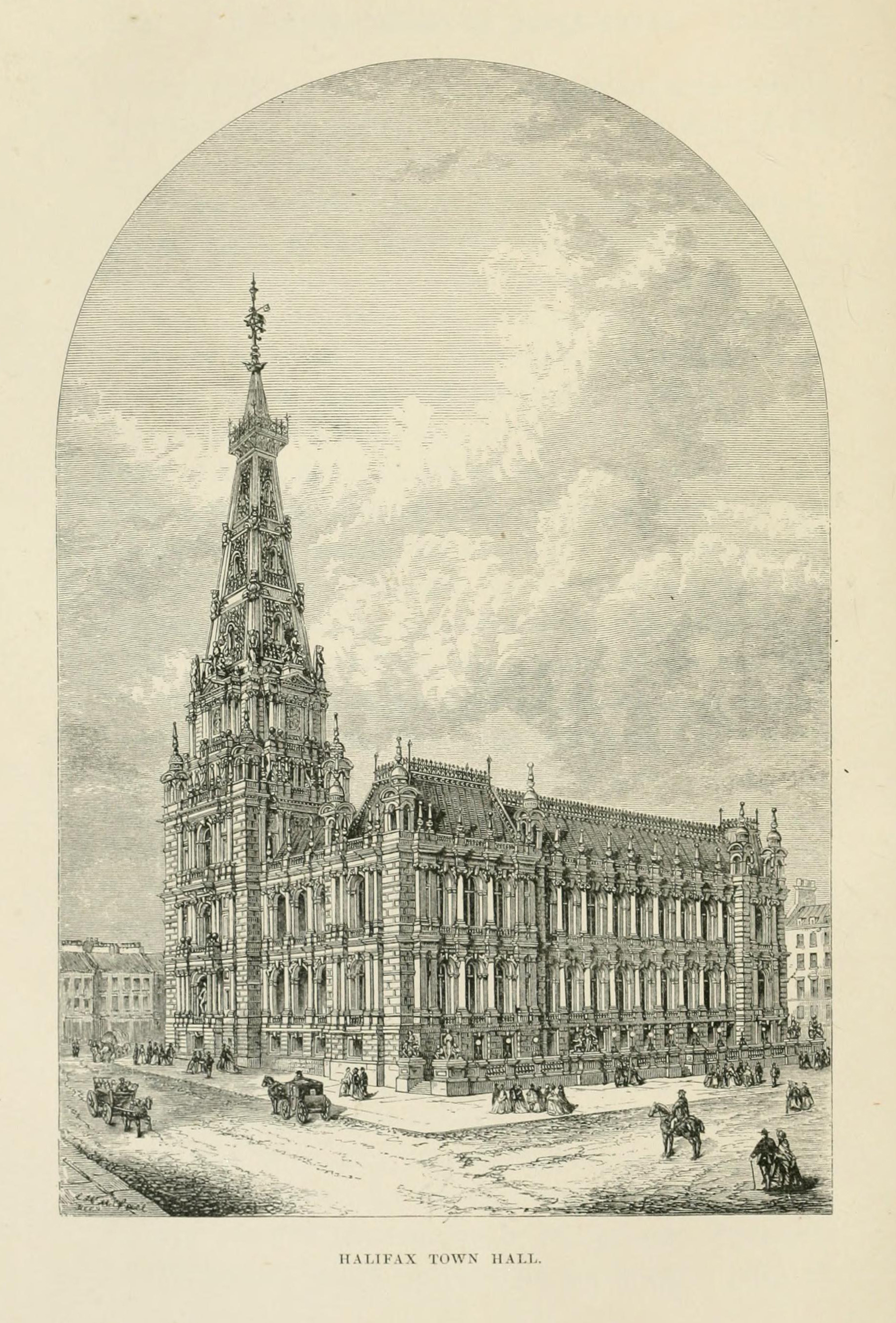
Victorian drawing of the building

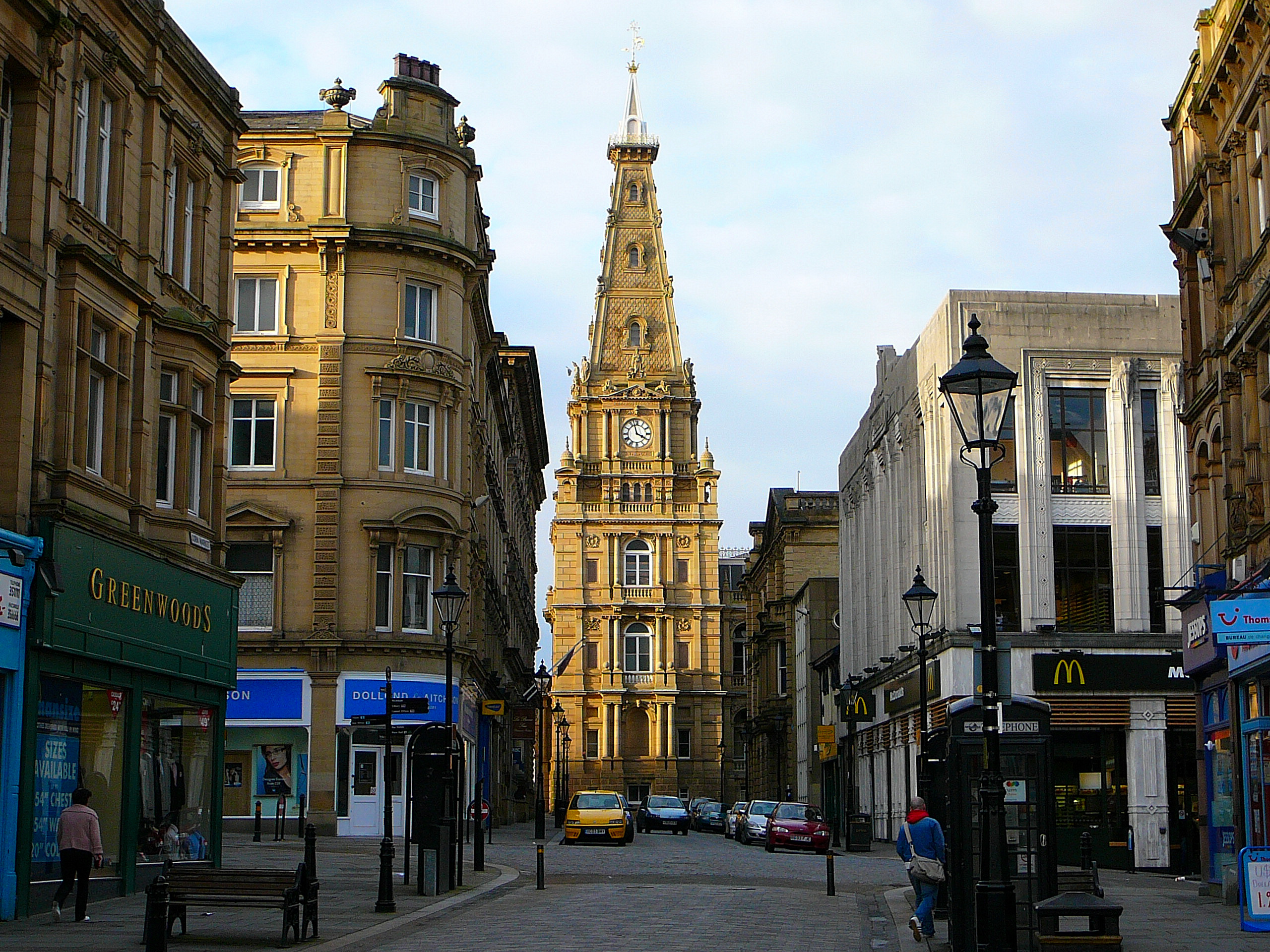
View of the tower terminating Princess Street

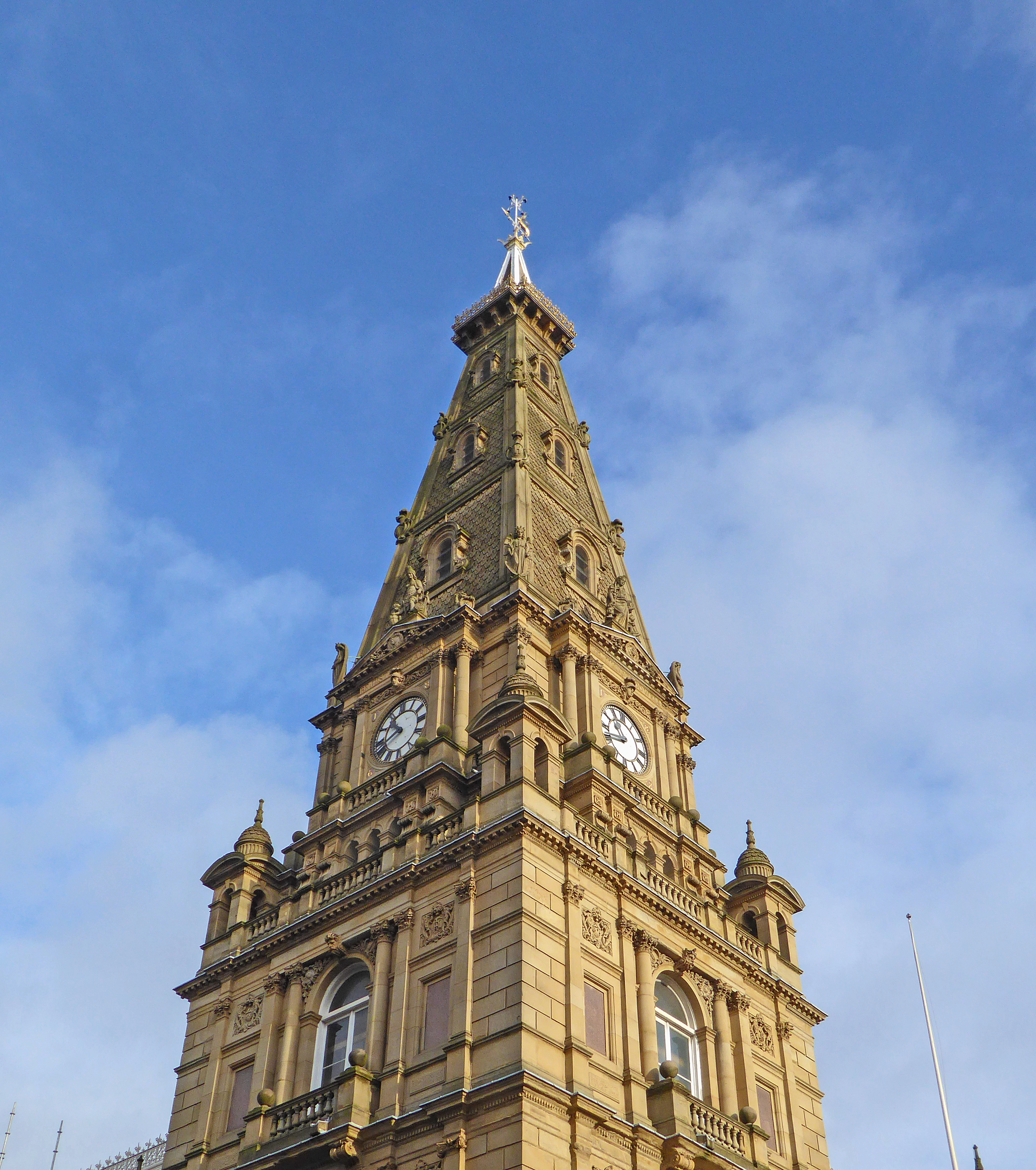
Town hall spire

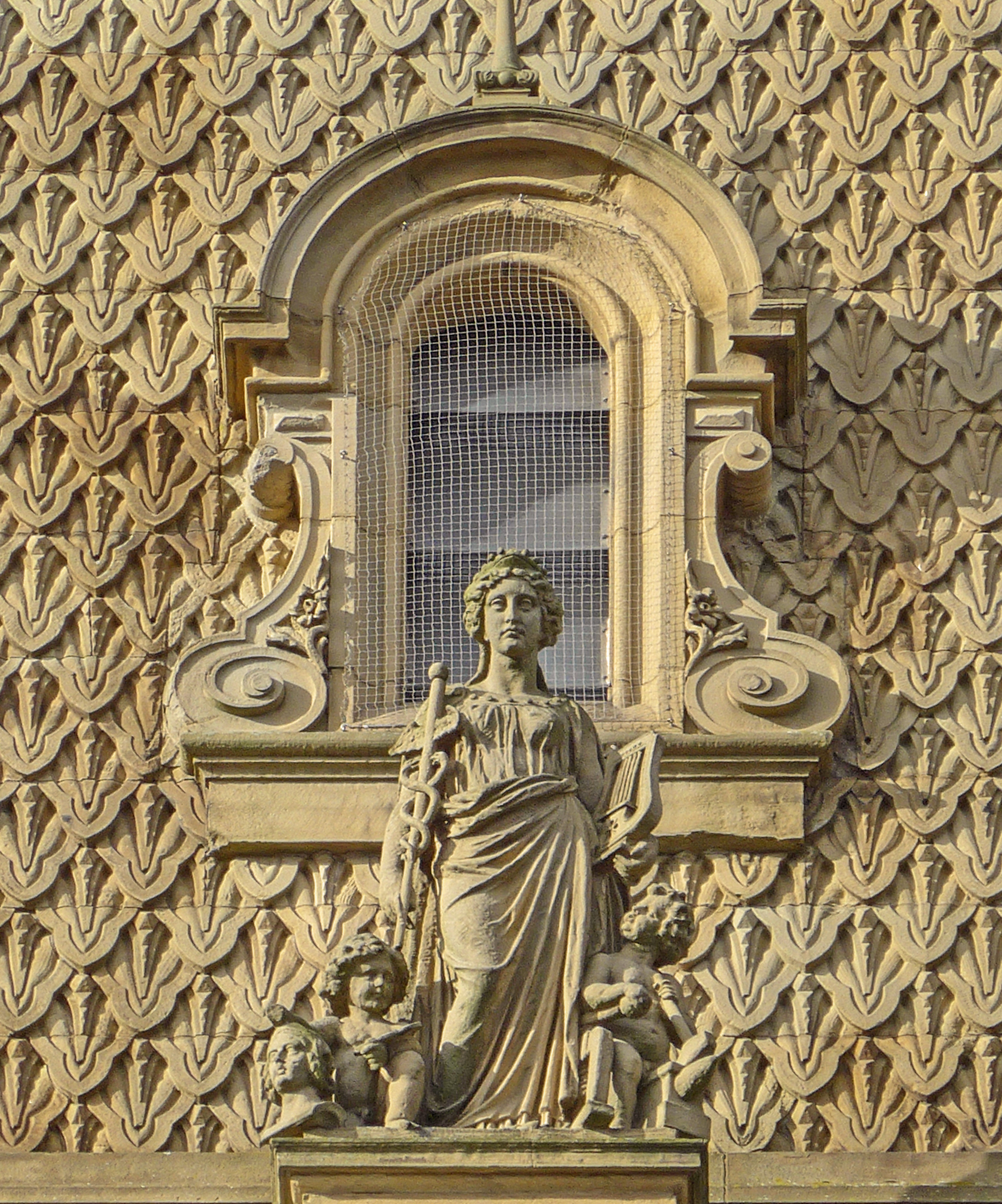
External carved decoration
Interior

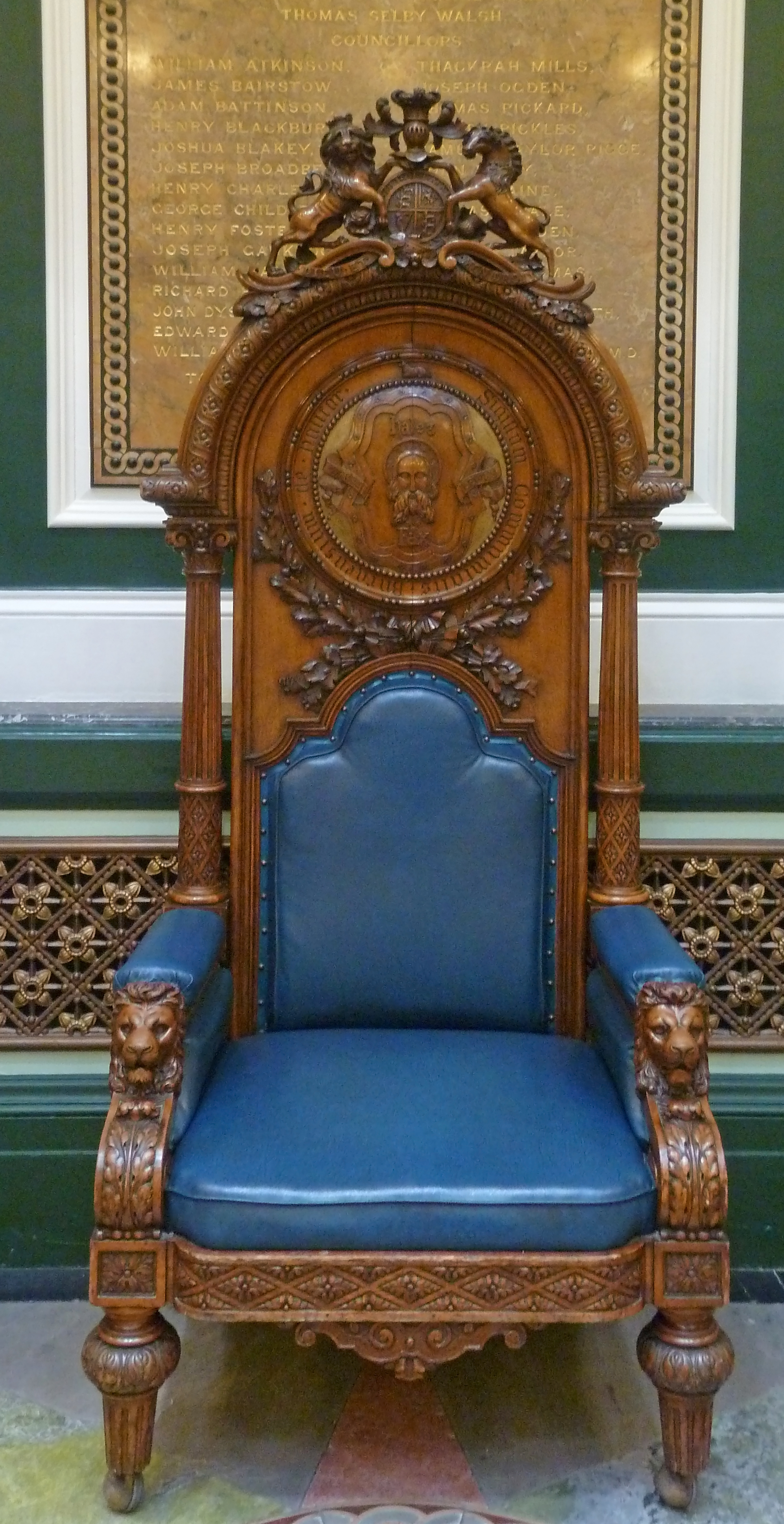
Prince of Wales's chair, made 1863

Mayor's Parlour

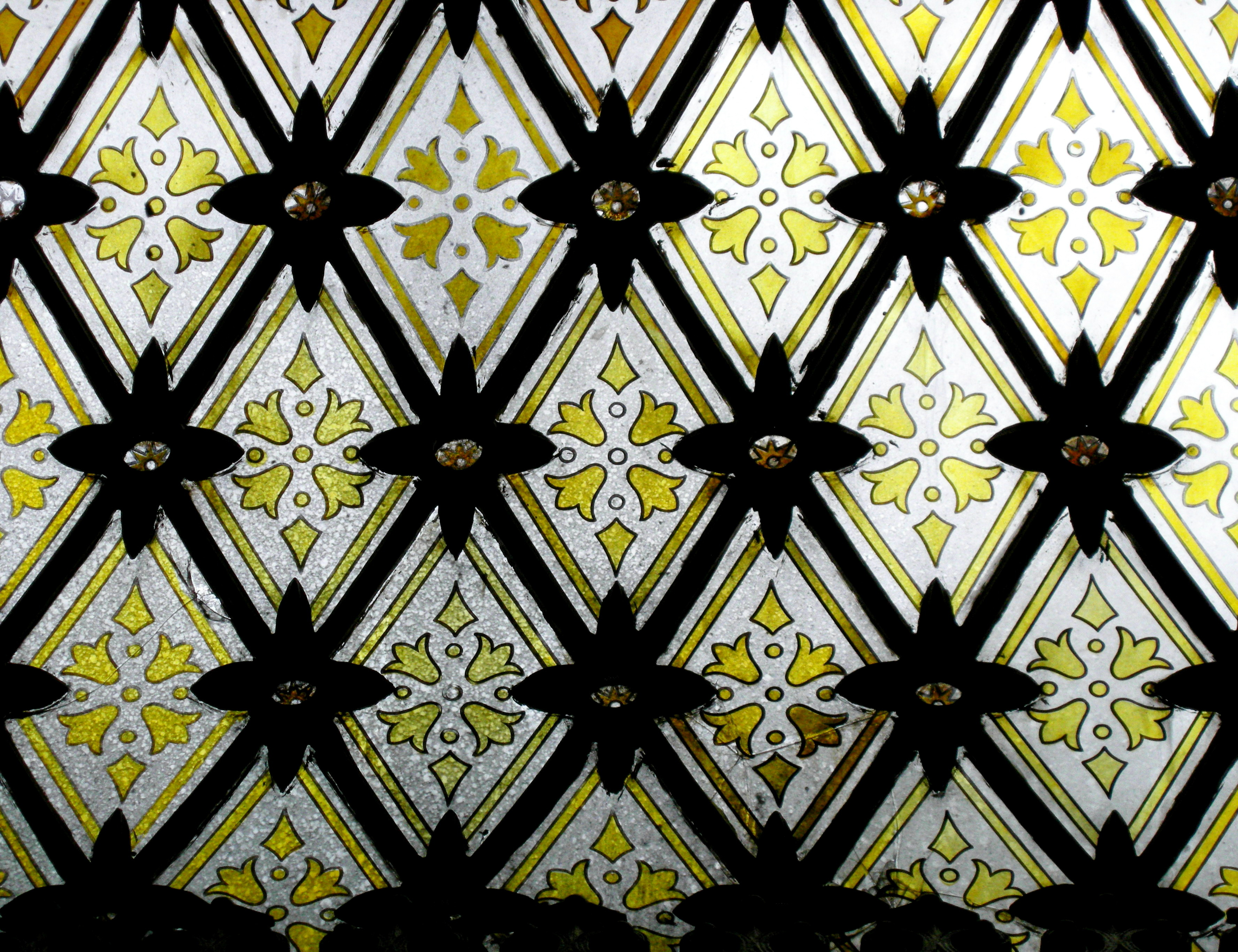
Victoria Hall, glass ceiling panel, made 1863

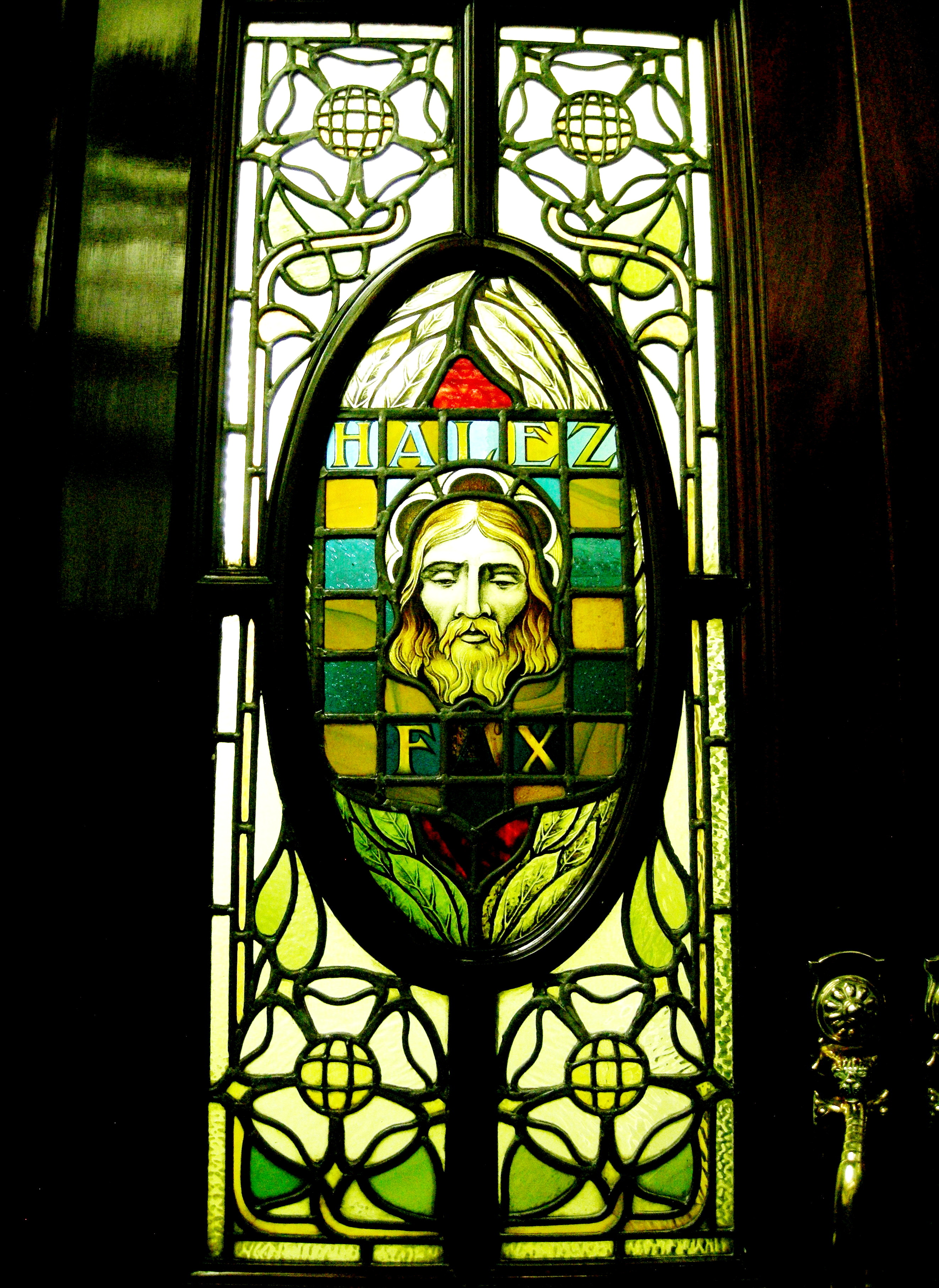
Committee room door panel made 1901, with face of John the Baptist

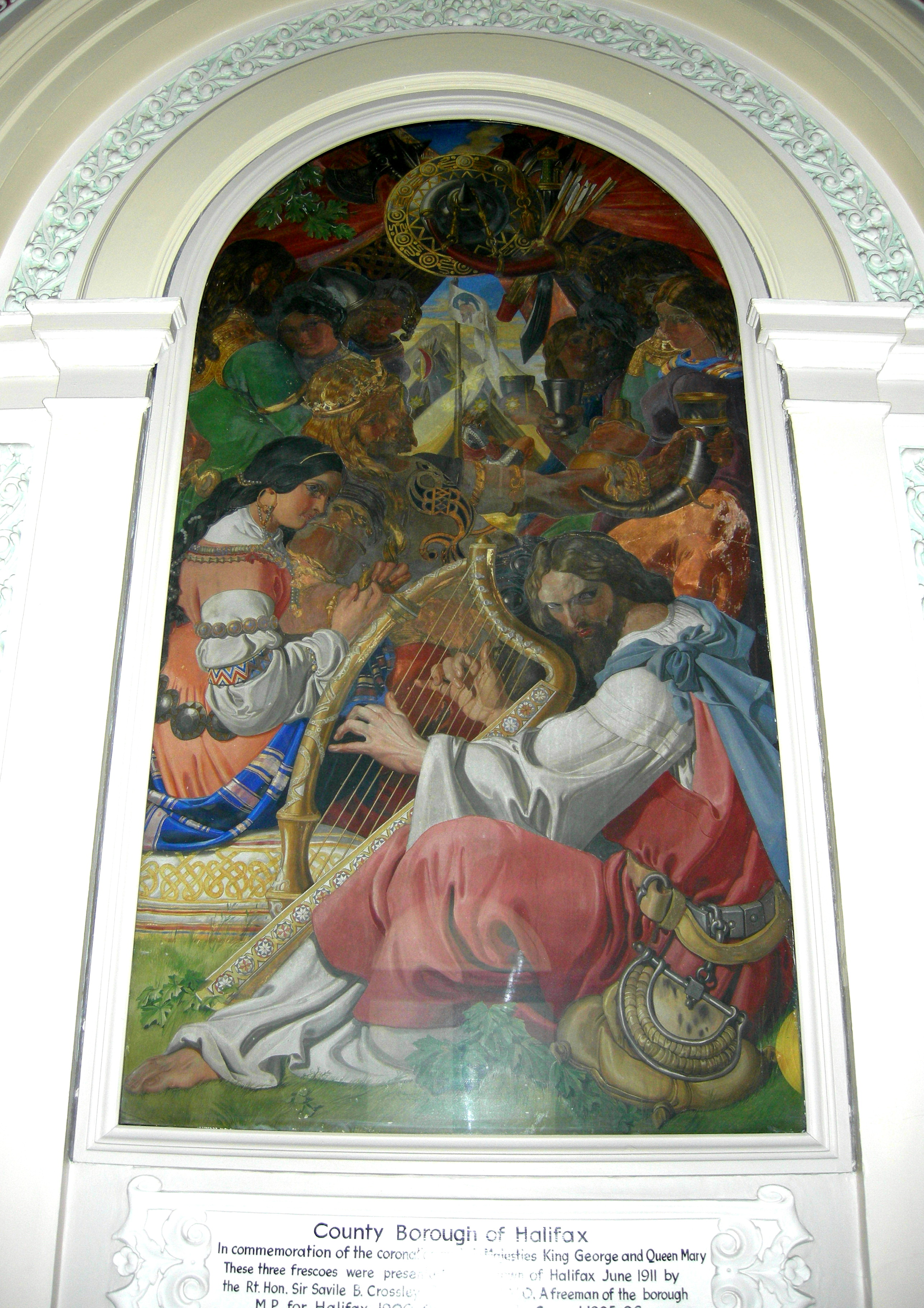
Daniel Maclise painting in stairwell

=== More images ===
==== Exterior ====
- 1863–2001 | 1886–1891 | 1893 | 1900 | 1960 | 21st century

== See also ==
- Grade II* listed buildings in Calderdale
- Listed buildings in Halifax, West Yorkshire
- Bradford City Hall
- Leeds Town Hall
- Morley Town Hall
- Wakefield County Hall
