= Grade II* listed buildings in West Yorkshire =

West Yorkshire shown within England

The county of West Yorkshire is divided into five metropolitan boroughs. The metropolitan boroughs of West Yorkshire are Leeds, Wakefield, Kirklees, Calderdale and Bradford.

As there are 413 Grade II* listed buildings in the county they have been split into separate lists for each borough.

- Grade II* listed buildings in Leeds
- Grade II* listed buildings in Wakefield
- Grade II* listed buildings in Kirklees
- Grade II* listed buildings in Calderdale
- Grade II* listed buildings in Bradford

== See also ==
- Grade I listed buildings in West Yorkshire
