= Shibden =

Village in West Yorkshire, England

Coordinates: 53.726324°N 1.838612°W

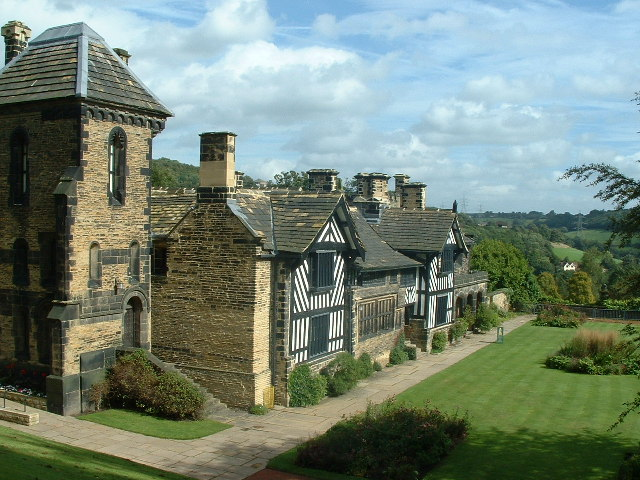
- Shibden Hall

- Location within West Yorkshire
- Population: 300 (c.)
- OS grid reference: SE107255
- Metropolitan borough: Calderdale
- Metropolitan county: West Yorkshire
- Region: Yorkshire and the Humber
- Country: England
- Sovereign state: United Kingdom
- Post town: HALIFAX
- Postcode district: HX3
- Police: West Yorkshire
- Fire: West Yorkshire
- Ambulance: Yorkshire

Shibden is a small dispersed community in Calderdale, West Yorkshire, England. It lies to the east of Halifax.

Shibden Hall has a north-west driveway to its lake, café and miniature railway; an adjoining driveway runs up a landscaped garden to the hall which hosts the West Yorkshire Folk Museum. The land sits on a north–south rise (gentle escarpment) between deep brooks, shared with more populous Southowram to the south.

== History ==
=== Name and economy ===
The name of this valley and village is a simplification and Great Vowel Shift sound shift from s(h)cep(e) den(e) (sheep dene). A brief mention in Edward III of England's Calendar of Close Rolls has the place as Shipen. It has, as manorial records equally attest, long been farmed. In the many centuries of the main English wool trade the manor prospered from wool production, with incident (largely subsistence) crop farming and offshoot lamb and mutton meat produce.

Halifax's own, chief, highly skilled manufacture of wool products began in 1414 ascribed to the settlement of certain emigrants from the Spanish Netherlands, who sought refuge from the persecutions under the government of the Duke of Alva. At this time there were about 13 houses in Halifax, but it soon began to increase in extent and population; in 1540 it contained 520 houses, and it has progressively advanced to its 18th century and early 19th century level of importance, as one of the main global sites of woollen manufacture (woollen-cloths, kerseymeres, shags, coatings, baizes, carpets, shalloons, tammies, corduroys, calimancoes, everlastings, moreens, crapes, bombasines, and damasks).

Under the manor park passes an early 19th century-built regular line rail tunnel. At a similar time parts of the wider manorial land were dug for underlying coal seams, which after some stealing from the owner were successfully tapped by contractors appointed by landowner, entrepreneur and private diarist Anne Lister (1791–1841) of Shibden Hall, after whom a local nickname of the time "Gentleman Jack" arose. Then in the 21st century a prominent book and a BBC six-part drama (Gentleman Jack) of that name were made, after an earlier two-part drama featuring Maxine Peake (The Secret Diaries of Miss Anne Lister), with associated modern folk song.

In 1600 a house with lands straddling Northowram and Shibden passed from Richard Northend to his kinsmen of the same surname (with usual fines being paid to the Crown).

Ecclesiastically in the Church of England it remains an eastern manor (with hamlet) in parishes of Halifax, which Minster church is the place of worship for the northern corners of the park and few adjoining buildings, including petrol service station which proliferate beyond Shibden Brook to the east, but which marks the western limit of Northowram (but not of Southowram to the south, being on the Shibden side of that powerful brook). Most of the buildings are today in the Halifax daughter parish of St Anne-in-the-Grove, Halifax, the church of which is in Southowram. The brook has been dammed and tapped much further north for a reservoir.

=== Local government ===
The land was part of the County Borough of Halifax (formed 1889) until its 1974 abolition.

== Landmarks ==
Scout Hall, a subinfeudated manor house, was built in 1681. Shibden Hall, the parent manor house, was built in the 15th century. The Hall hosts the West Yorkshire Folk Museum and has a lakeside café and miniature railway.
