= Wainhouse Tower =

Folly in Halifax, England

Coordinates: 53.7125°N 1.8825°W

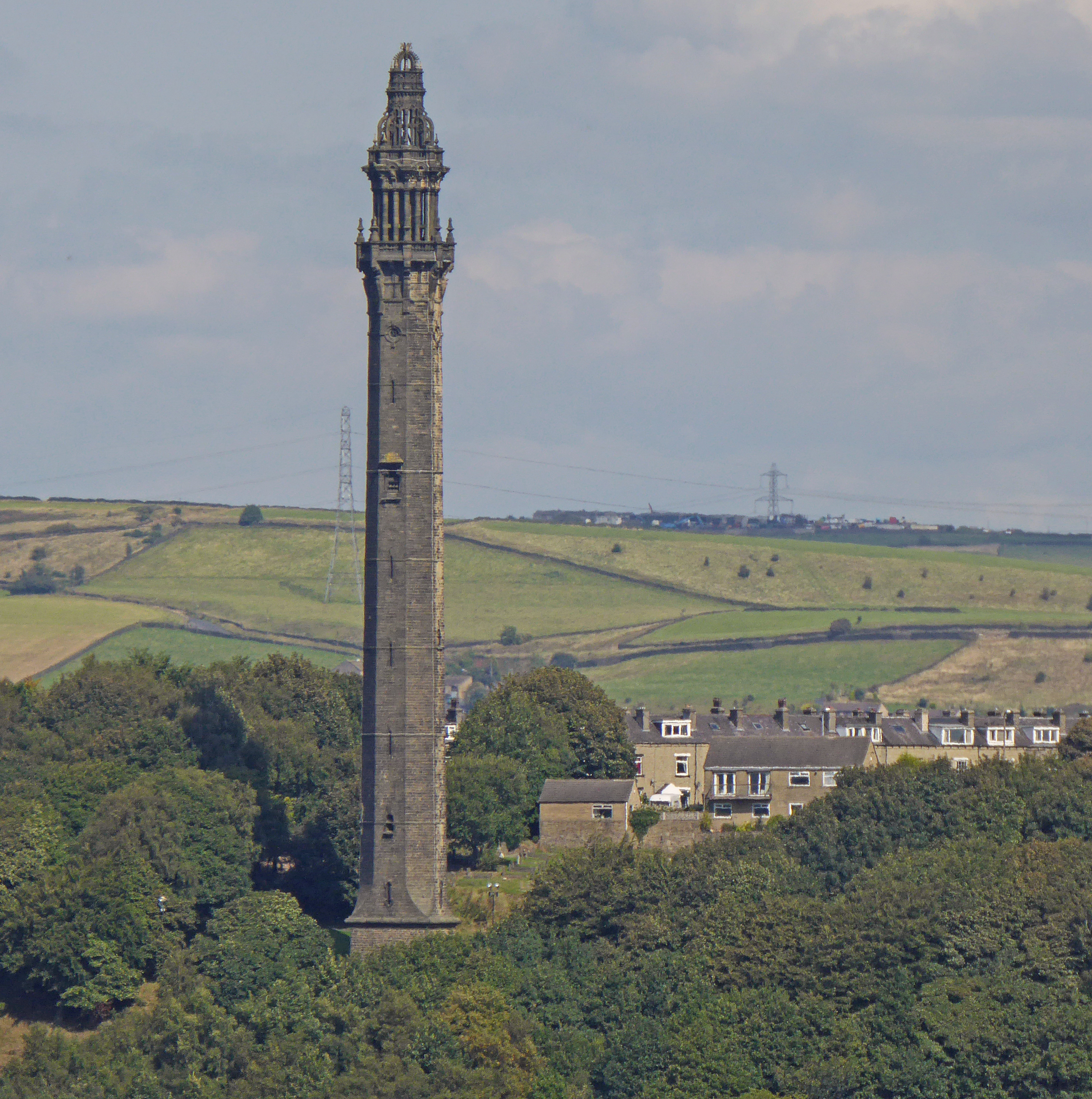
Wainhouse Tower

Wainhouse Tower, sometimes called the "Tower of Spite", is a folly in the parish of King Cross, on the south-west side of Halifax, Calderdale, West Yorkshire, in England. At 275 feet (84 m), it is the tallest structure in Calderdale and the tallest folly in the world, and was erected between 1871 and 1875. The main shaft is octagonal in shape and has a square base and 369 steps leading to the first of two viewing platforms which is open to the public, and a total of 405 to the top viewing platform which is usually closed to the public. The tower is open to the public during bank holidays, and is a Grade II* listed building.

== History ==
One driving force behind the erection of the viewing platforms was a long-standing feud between landowning neighbours John Edward Wainhouse (1817–1883) and Sir Henry Edwards (1812–1886). Edwards had boasted that he had the most private estate in Halifax, Pye Nest (demolished 1925–30), into which no one could see. As the estate was on land adjacent to the chimney's site, following the opening of the viewing platforms, Edwards could never claim privacy again.

The tower was designed by architect Isaac Booth as a chimney to serve the Washer Lane dye works owned by Wainhouse. The height of the chimney was to satisfy the Smoke Abatement Act 1870 which required a tall chimney to carry smoke out of the valleys in which the factories were built. A much simpler chimney would have satisfied the requirements but Wainhouse insisted that it should be an object of beauty.

In 1874, John Wainhouse sold the mill to his works manager, who refused to pay the cost of the chimney's construction, so Wainhouse kept the tower for himself and used it as an observatory. Booth left after a dispute and was replaced by another local architect, Richard Swarbrick Dugdale, who is responsible for the elaborate galleries and the corona dome at the top. The tower was completed on 9 September 1875, at a cost of £14,000 (equivalent to £1,700,000 in 2023).

In 1918, an appeal was started to raise money to purchase the tower for the local community, with a target of £1,000.

== Restoration ==
In 2006, Wainhouse Tower was closed because of safety problems. Work to repair it began in July 2008 and took about five months. During the restoration, the top section of the tower was partly dismantled and rebuilt, decorative sections and part of the main shaft were repointed, missing stone finials replaced, the drainage system improved, corroded ironwork replaced and cracks at the base of the tower fixed. The tower reopened to the general public on 4 May 2009. The restoration cost was £400,000.

In 2011, the Huffington Post included the tower in its list of the "Top 10 Pieces of Folly Architecture", and The Telegraph included the tower on their top 15 list of "Britain's Best Architectural Follies".

== See also ==
- Grade II* listed buildings in Calderdale
- Listed buildings in Sowerby Bridge
