= Edward Akroyd =

British politician

Coat of arms of Edward Akroyd
| Crest In front of a stag’s head proper three spear heads Sable encircled by a wreath of oak Escutcheon Azure a chevron and in base a stag’s head erased Argent on a chief of the last two stags' heads erased of the field. Motto In Veritate Victoria (Victory in Truth) |

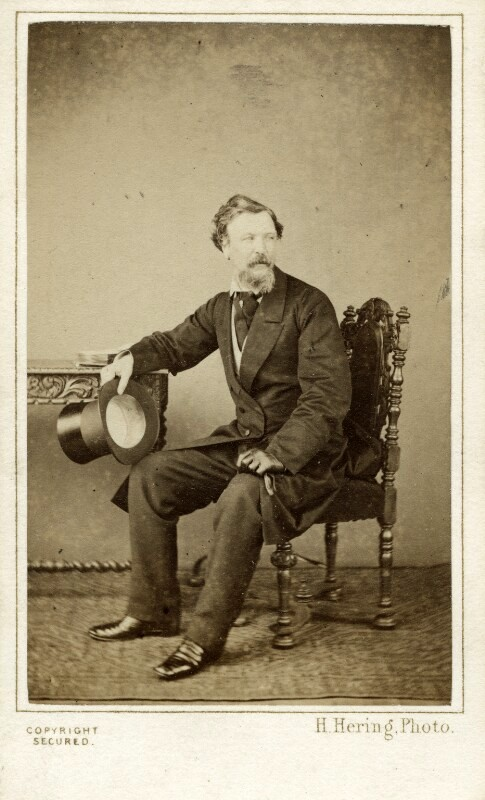
Edward Akroyd bt Henry Hering

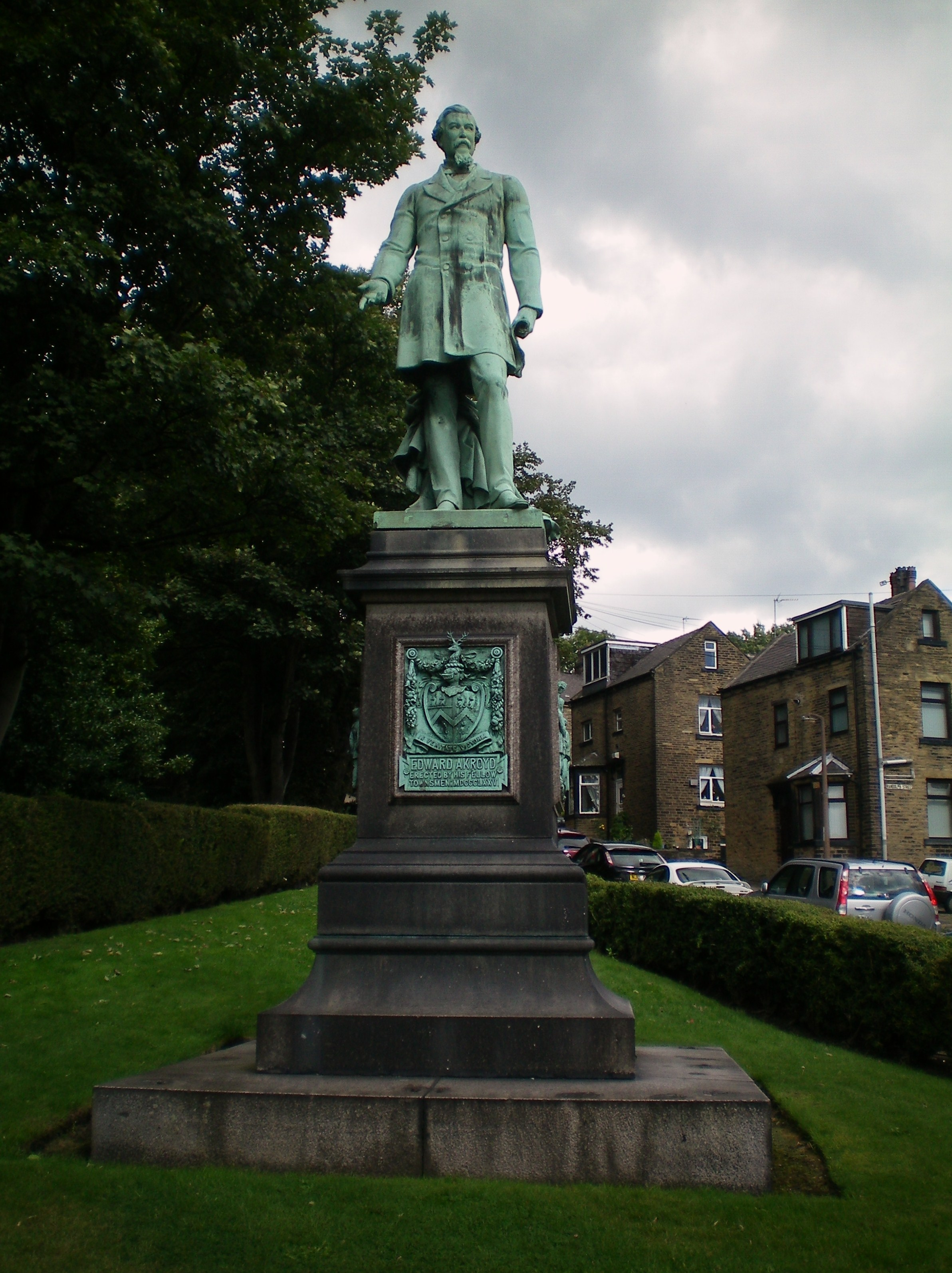
Statue of Edward Akroyd at All Souls Church, Haley Hill

Lieutenant Colonel Edward Akroyd (1810–1887), English manufacturer, was born into a textile manufacturing family in 1810, and when he died in 1887, he still owned the family firm. He inherited "James Akroyd & Sons Ltd." from his father in 1847, and he became the owner of one of the country's largest worsted manufacturers.

He established mills at Haley Hill in Halifax and then at Copley, two miles or so to the south. He proved to be a very successful businessman, and his firm made him very prosperous. At Haley Hill, not far from his mills, he extended a large mansion, Bankfield, and then went to live there.

Akroyd was well read and concerned about the fortunes of Halifax and the terrible social conditions that grew out of the Industrial Revolution. He funded and supported a local allotment society and many institutions for the working classes, a school for child labourers, a workers' pension scheme, several churches (he was a staunch Anglican) and a cemetery. He founded a Working Men's College, the first outside London.

In the mid-1850s, he helped found the Yorkshire Penny Bank (to encourage workers to save), and he worked closely with the Halifax Permanent Building Society (later the Halifax Building Society) to promote home ownership through his model village Akroydon. This was built after his initial housing development, which he had undertaken with his brother at Copley, to show people how housing conditions could be improved. He was partly responsible for bringing the railway to the town.

Edward Akroyd became a Lieutenant Colonel of the 4th Yorkshire West Riding (Halifax) Rifle Volunteers in 1861, and served as a member of Parliament.

Akroyd's kindness was well known, and many had cause to be grateful to him. They felt his problems as keenly as their own when some of his overseas investments failed and he suffered great financial loss. The unkindest cut of fate, however, was when he fell from his horse and received severe head injuries. After this, his failing health caused him to leave Halifax for a secluded life at St Leonards-on-Sea, attended by only one manservant, and it was there that he died in 1887. At his funeral, 15,000 mourners crowded outside All Souls' Church and many businesses closed for a few hours as a mark of respect. On his death, he left an estate of £1,234 1s. 10d.

Now that the Akroyd business empire has passed well into history, what remains of it in Halifax is something of the architectural heritage to remind one of the scope of Akroyd's vision. The small church at Copley survives (without the colossal mill which stood nearby). At Haley Hill the mill survives in multiple occupation as part of the Dean Clough business park; the Akroyd mansion, Bankfield, which has been a municipal museum for many years still stands on the edge of the gothic-style, stone-built model village, which survives more or less intact. The crowning feature of the scheme, Sir George Gilbert Scott's white limestone All Souls' Church (1856-8) still dominates the area, its lofty spire reaching 236 feet into the Yorkshire sky: the second tallest in the county (Wakefield Cathedral has the highest spire). Both St Stephen's Copley and All Souls itself are now vested in the Churches Conservation Trust, All Souls' having been rescued from demolition by a continuing programme of restoration initially organized by a board of Trustees assembled for the purpose. No regular services have been held at All Souls' Haley Hill since 1977.

A blue plaque commemorating Akroyd was erected by the Halifax Civic Trust at Dean Clough.

Parliament of the United Kingdom
| Preceded by Sir James Stansfeld and Charles Wood | Member of Parliament for Halifax; 1865–1874; With: Sir James Stansfeld | Succeeded by Sir James Stansfeld and John Crossley |
