= Shibden Valley =

Coordinates: 53.726°N 1.839°W

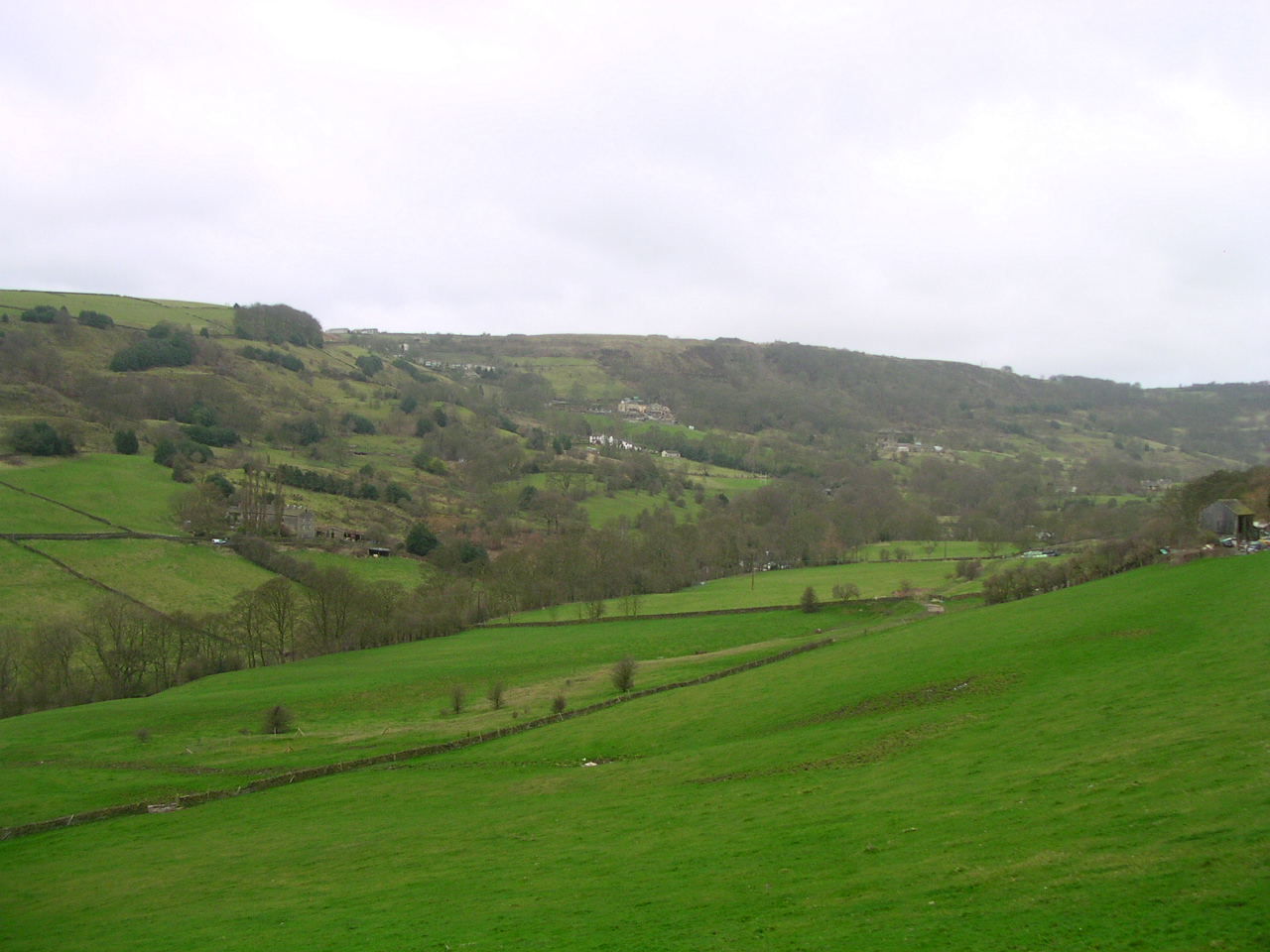
Shibden Valley

Shibden Valley (also known as Shibden Dale) is to the east of Halifax, West Yorkshire, England, where the community of Shibden lies. The name of the Shibden valley comes from scepe dene meaning "sheep valley" or "Sheep Vale". The area was heavily involved in wool production but was also a site of much coal production and flagstones from Northowram, Southowram and Hipperholme areas.

The Red Beck stream flows down the valley, joining the River Calder at Brookfoot. It runs for 6 miles (10 km) and drains an area of 6 square miles (16 km^{2}).

Southowram stands on the southern side of the valley, and Northowram stands on the northern side of the valley. Shibden Valley stretches from Halifax through to Queensbury in the south-west of Bradford. A medieval road, the Magna Via, crosses west to east in the lower part of the valley over Beacon Hill. This was an ancient road between Halifax and Wakefield and the road still retains its Hollow way character with stone setts for some of the route. The A58 also crosses the valley as does the Caldervale line between Bradford Interchange and Halifax, though this is in a 1,105-yard (1,010 m) tunnel under Beacon Hill.

Shibden Hall lies in the valley set in the grounds of Shibden Park which is accessible to the public and has walks, a boating lake and a miniature railway.
