= St Stephen's Church, Copley =

Coordinates: 53.6972°N 1.8731°W

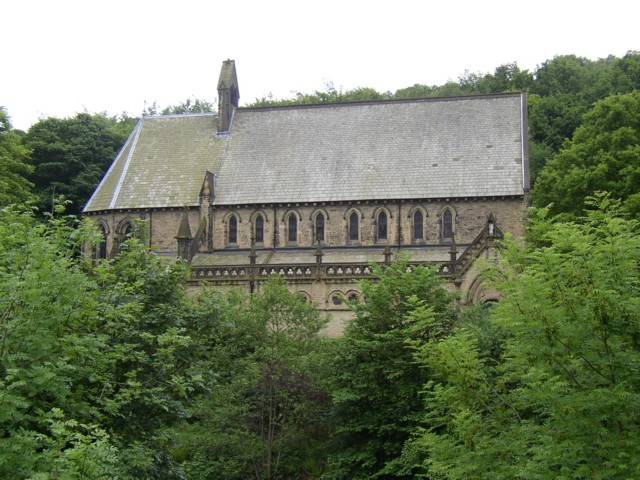
- St Stephen's Church, Copley, from the south

- Location in West Yorkshire
- OS grid reference: SE 084 223
- Location: Copley, West Yorkshire
- Country: England
- Denomination: Anglican
- Website: Churches Conservation Trust

History
- Founder: Edward Akroyd
- Dedication: Saint Stephen

Architecture
- Functional status: Redundant
- Heritage designation: Grade II*
- Designated: 6 June 1983
- Architect: W. H. Crossland
- Architectural type: Church
- Style: Gothic Revival
- Completed: 1863

Specifications
- Materials: Stone, slate roof

St Stephen's Church is a redundant Anglican church in the village of Copley, West Yorkshire, England. It is recorded in the National Heritage List for England as a designated Grade II* listed building, and is under the care of the Churches Conservation Trust.

== History ==
The church was built in 1863 for the industrialist Edward Akroyd, and designed by W. H. Crossland. It stands on a wooded hillside in the Calder Valley opposite a model village built by Akroyd for his employees.

== Architecture ==
=== Exterior ===
St Stephen's is constructed in stone and has a slate roof. Its plan consists of a five-bay nave with a clerestory, north and south aisles, a chancel with a five-sided apse, a south porch, and a north chapel acting as a transept. In the clerestory are two lancet windows in each bay, and at the west end is a four-light window over which is a round window. Along the aisle walls are three cinquefoil windows in each bay; the bays are separated by buttresses surmounted by pinnacles. In the transept are two lancet windows, over which is a quatrefoil window. The apse also contains lancets. Above the walls of the aisles are pierced trefoil parapets. Over the join between the nave and the chancel is a double bellcote.

=== Interior ===
Inside the church, the nave has a waggon roof, while the chancel is tunnel vaulted. The arcades are of different design, one is supported by cylindrical piers, the other is on clustered colonnettes. The transept is occupied by the organ. The interior of the church is decorated with wall paintings. These include depictions of saints on the south wall of the chancel, and stencilled designs on the ceilings of the aisles. The pulpit is also highly decorated, with mosaic panels, and there is also mosaic in the reredos. The west window and in the windows of the apse contain stained glass. The glass in the apse was designed by Hardman & Co.

== See also ==
- List of churches preserved by the Churches Conservation Trust in Northern England
