= Borough Market, Halifax =

English Victorian covered market

Coordinates: 53.7223°N 1.8593°W

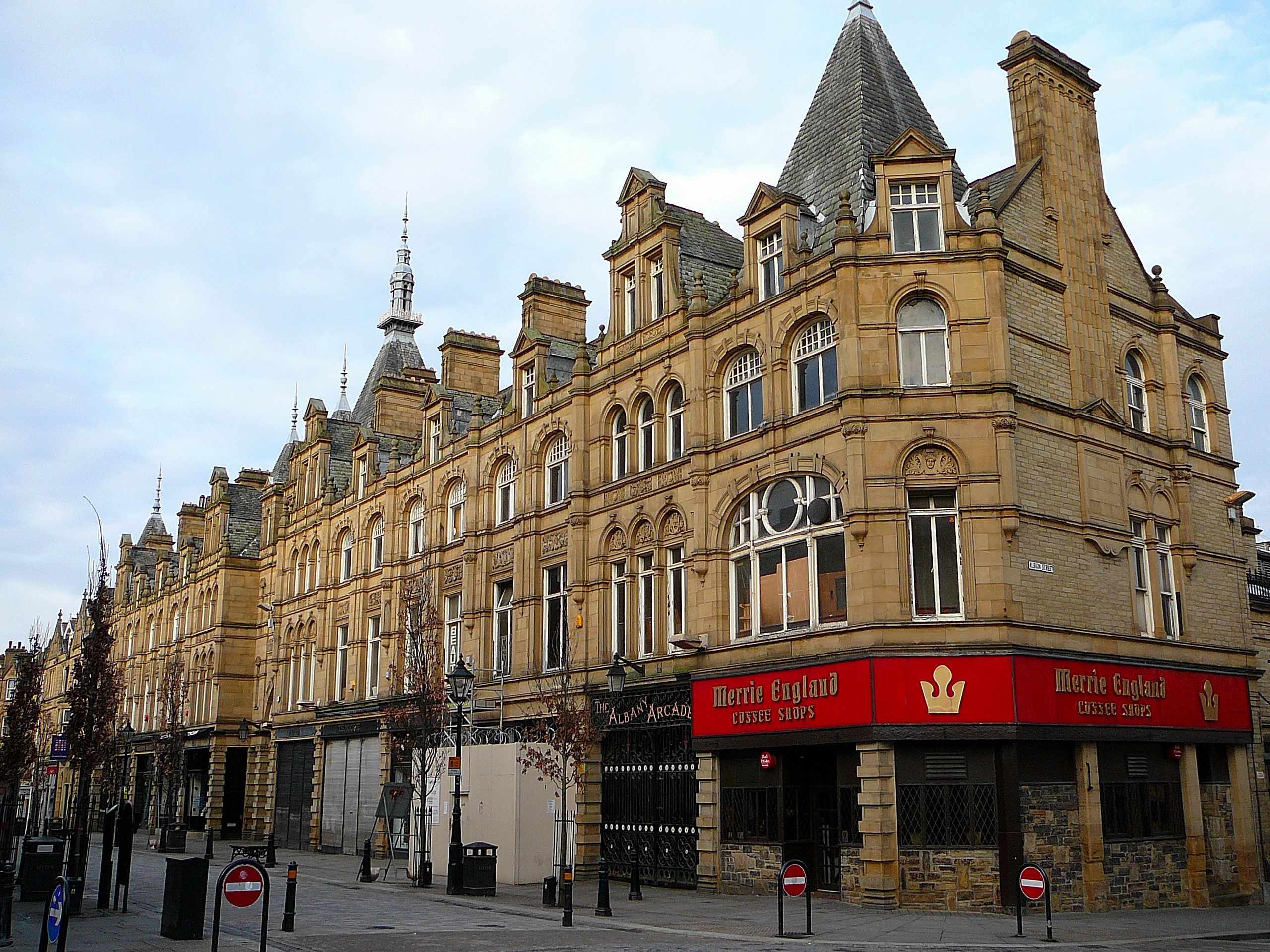
West side of the Borough Market viewed from Corn Market in 2008

Borough Market is a Victorian covered market in Halifax, West Yorkshire, England. The market occupies a town centre site between Southgate, Albion Street and Market Street. The glass and wrought iron covered marketplace, surrounded by stone built shops and accommodation, was built between 1891 and 1896 and opened by the future King George V and Queen Mary. The design included three public houses on the Market Street side and fishmongers' shops on Albion Street with the remaining exterior shops all being butchers' shops. The award-winning market is open six days a week with some 125 market stalls.

== History ==
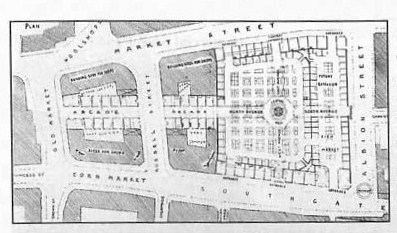
An original floor plan of the market

The site had previously been occupied by a red brick Georgian market place built in 1790. A nearby slaughterhouse had ended the practice of slaughtering animals in the street. Trade had been concentrated here since 1810 when an Act of Parliament had been obtained which forbade street trading in other parts of the town. Another Act of Parliament in 1853 allowed Halifax council to buy New Market, as it was known, from its private owners for a price of £7,700.

The Markets and Fairs Committee decided in 1890 to replace the overflowing market place with a new structure. Local architects Joseph and John Leeming were engaged to draw up plans. A £50,000 loan was obtained by the Corporation the following year, with the final cost rising to £130,000, which was £20,000 over budget. Work began in October 1892 and progressed slowly, until the market was officially opened on 25 July 1896 by the Duke and Duchess of York, who later became King George V and Queen Mary. They also opened the Royal Halifax Infirmary on the same day. Opening hours at the outset were 8 am to 8 pm on Mondays to Wednesdays, with half day closing on Thursdays, 8 am to 4 pm. Fridays were 8 am to 9 pm and Saturdays 6 am to 10.30 pm.

The building's stonework was cleaned in 1973, the same year that Southgate was made into a pedestrian area, with the road raised to pavement level.

The market has been Grade II* listed by Historic England since 1973.

In 1987 the Civic Trust gave the market an award for its renovated Victorian shop fronts, commenting that the market has "an elegance seldom seen on such a grand scale".

In 1993 the central clock, often used as a rendezvous point, was refurbished using more than fifty square feet of gold leaf.

In 1995 the Halifax Centre Strategy Report recommended moving the fishmongers on Albion Street inside the market and replacing them with shop units to improve attractiveness and rental income.

== Construction ==
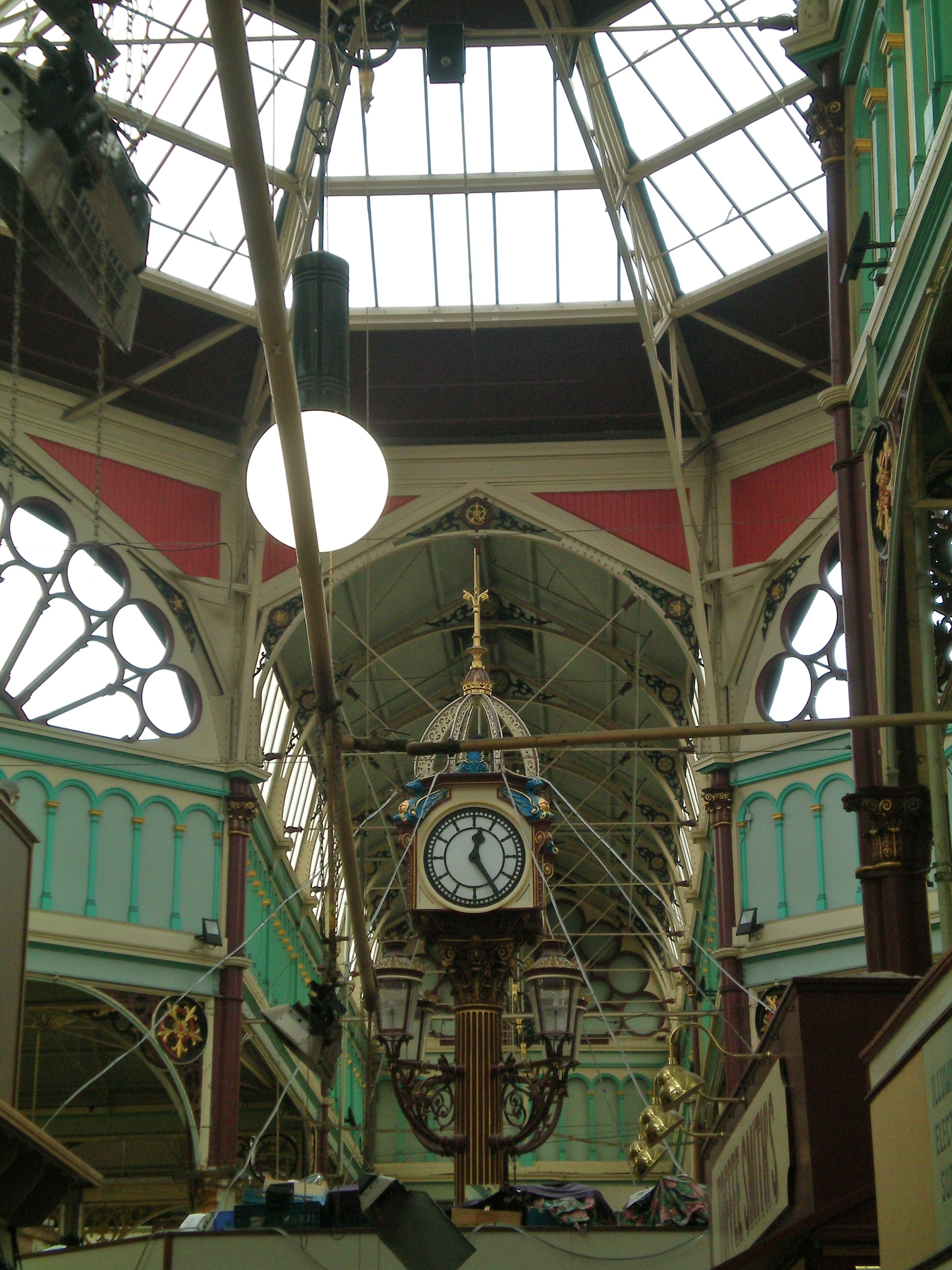
The clock under the octagonal lantern in 2009

A 5,850 m^{2} (7,000 square yard) canopy of glass and wrought iron covers the space between ornate four storey stone buildings, topped by baroque turrets, on Southgate and Market Street, and single storey stone shops on the other sides. The multi-storey buildings contain living quarters, originally for market traders and managers. Water was originally drawn from a well near the Market Street entrance. There were originally forty three outward facing shops, all butcher's, in the stone buildings, with the exception of Albion Street where there was a fish market, and three public houses on Market Street. The pubs were the Wheatsheaf, later renamed the Portman and Pickles, the Saddle and the Peacock. The Portman and Pickles was named after Eric Portman and Wilfred Pickles. At the centre of the market an 18-metre (60 ft) high octagonal lantern is supported by decorative cast iron columns. Below the lantern a decorative clock was originally visible from most parts of the market, although now obscured by taller stalls. Cruciform main passages are mirrored in the structure of the roof, with solid roofing above the passages creating four glass roofed quarters, each divided into three sections, glazed with rectangular panes. Flagstones used for flooring in the market, still in good condition, came from Solomon Marshall's quarry at Southowram, a business which has since grown into Marshalls plc. The slope of the site is accommodated without the use of steps.

== In modern times ==
The market operates six days a week with about 125 stalls and won the title of best market by the National Association of British Market Authorities in 2008. A centenary celebration was held in 1996, coinciding with Great British Market Week between 19 and 26 May.

== See also ==
- Listed buildings in Halifax, West Yorkshire
