= All Souls' Church, Halifax =

Coordinates: 53.7304°N 1.8628°W

All Souls Church, Halifax
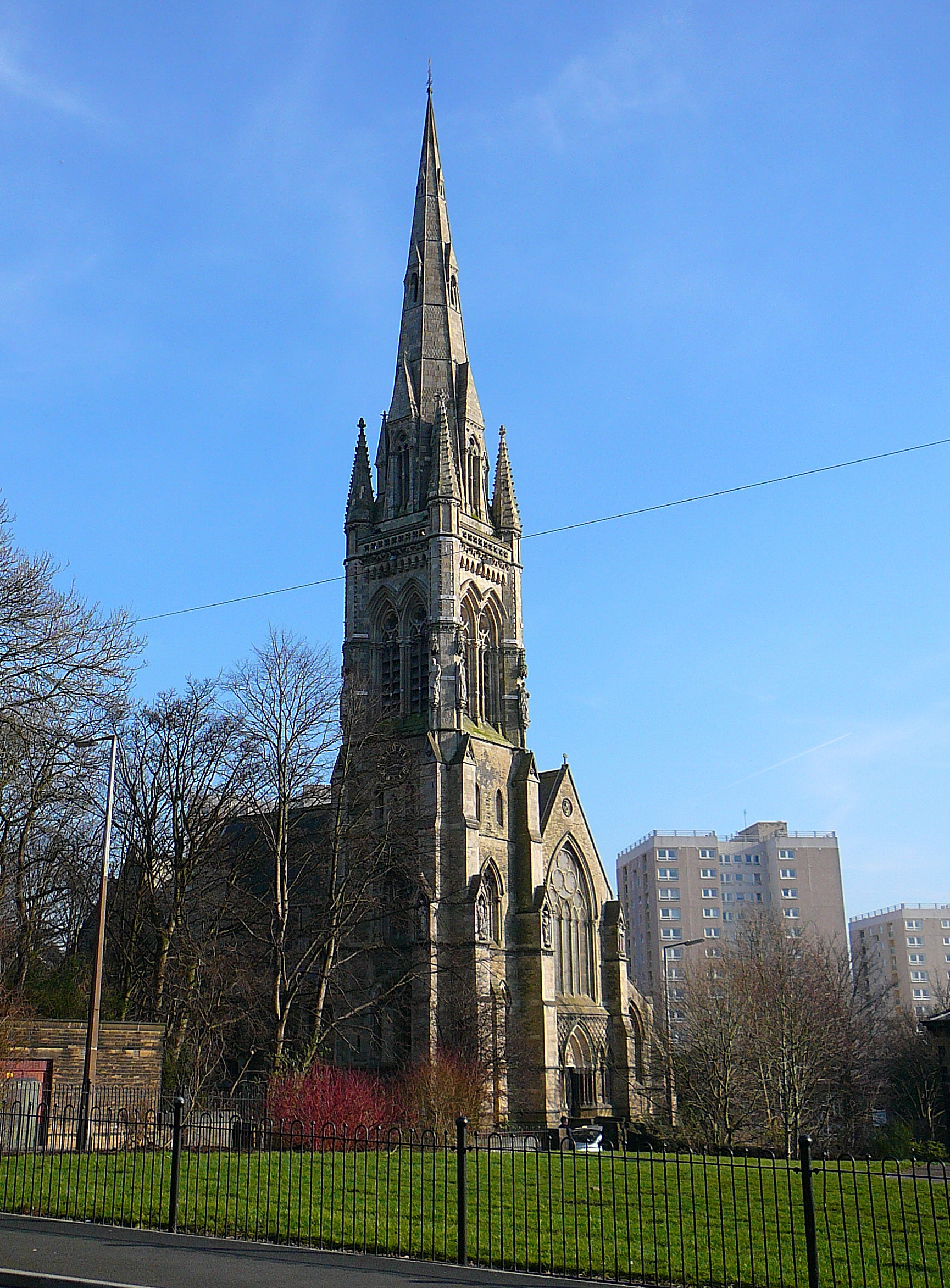
- All Souls Church, Halifax

- Location in West Yorkshire
- OS grid reference: SE 091 260
- Location: Haley Hill, Halifax, West Yorkshire
- Country: England
- Denomination: Anglican
- Website: Churches Conservation Trust

History
- Founder: Edward Akroyd
- Dedication: All Souls

Architecture
- Functional status: redundant, limited opening to visitors
- Heritage designation: Grade I
- Designated: 3 November 1954
- Architect: Sir George Gilbert Scott
- Architectural type: Church
- Style: Gothic Revival (13th–14th century)
- Groundbreaking: 1856
- Completed: 1859

Specifications
- Materials: Stone, slate roofs

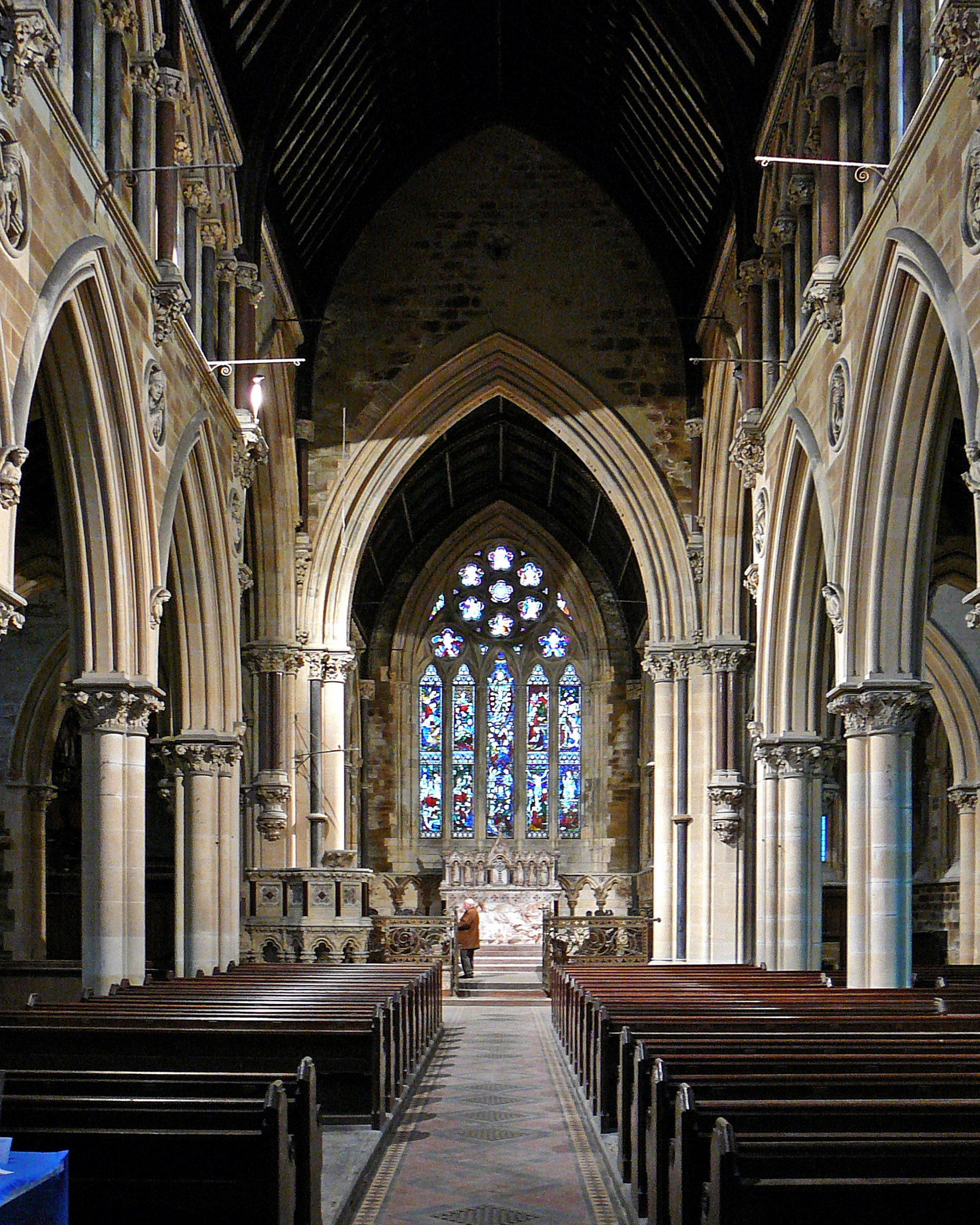
Interior of All Souls'.

All Souls Church, Halifax, is a redundant Anglican church in Haley Hill, Halifax, West Yorkshire, England. It is recorded in the National Heritage List for England as a designated Grade I listed building, and is under the care of the Churches Conservation Trust. The church is open to visitors at limited times.

== Early history ==
All Souls was commissioned and paid for by the local industrialist Edward Akroyd in 1856. The foundation stone was laid on 25 April that year. Akroyd appointed Sir George Gilbert Scott as architect, and the church was completed in 1859. Scott considered it to be his finest church. It was intended to be the centrepiece of the model village of Akroydon, and Scott also designed Akroyd's own house and garden, the vicarage and houses for his employees. There is a statue of Akroyd, in its own lawned enclosure, immediately adjacent to the church.

== Architecture ==
=== Exterior ===
The church is constructed in stone, with slate roofs. The dressings are in magnesian limestone. Its plan is cruciform and its architectural style is of the 13th–14th century. In detail, its plan consists of a nave with a clerestory and north and south aisles, north and south transepts, a chancel with chapels to the north and south, and a south porch. At the northeast corner is a vestry, and in the northwest angle is a tower and spire. Under the tower is a baptistry. The nave measures 87 feet 6 inches (26.67 m) by 54 feet (16.46 m), the transepts 22 feet 6 inches (6.86 m) by 18 feet 9 inches (5.72 m), the chancel 37 feet 6 inches (11.43 m) by 24 feet 3 inches (7.39 m), and the chapels measure 15 feet (4.57 m) by 17 feet (5.18 m). The ridge of the roof is 65 feet (19.81 m) above the floor of the nave. The spire is 236 feet (71.93 m) high.

The tower has four stages, on the top of which is a parapet containing arches, and an octagonal, crocketted pinnacle at each corner. In the upper stage of the tower are double two-light bell openings. The staircase is contained in the wall and the buttress at the northeast corner of the tower. The spire is divided into five stages by moulded bands; in three of the stages are gabled windows. On its summit is a finial and a weathervane. At the west end of the church is a deeply recessed doorway, over which is a tympanum containing sculpture. The south porch contains an arcade of three arches, each containing a single-light trefoil-headed window, and deeply recessed doorways. On the north face of the north transept is a priest's door. The clerestory has 15 windows on each side.

=== Interior ===
Internally, between the nave and aisles are arcades with columns made from Derbyshire marble. The piers of the tower and transept arches are made from Aberdeen granite. The church is floored with Minton black, red and chocolate encaustic tiles. The three steps leading from the nave to the chancel are in Nottinghamshire red sandstone. The arcades between the chancel and the chapels are carried on columns of Italian marble. In the chancel is a sedilia, and a credence table built into its wall of the chancel. Between the nave and the chancel is an alabaster plinth carrying a screen in wrought iron. All the carving in the church was overseen by the sculptor John Birnie Philip, and the screen was made by Francis Skidmore. The reredos is in alabaster and contains niches with statues of the Virgin Mary, Mary Magdalene, Mary of Bethany, Saint John, Nicodemus and Joseph of Arimathea. The octagonal pulpit is in Caen stone on a pedestal of Derbyshire marble. The font is square and has a circular bowl. It is made in serpentine from The Lizard and is carried on a pedestal of Aberdeen granite. All the windows contain stained glass. Some of the windows were designed and made by Hardman & Co., and others are by William Wailes, and Clayton and Bell. The organ has four manuals and is currently unplayable and awaiting restoration, but was the largest instrument in the town. The original organ dating from the opening of the building was a smaller instrument occupying half the space of its successor, the present instrument built in 1868 by Forster and Andrews of Hull to a specification by Edmund Schulze. It was rebuilt and enlarged in 1902 by Norman and Beard. There is a ring of eight bells in operational order (2019), all cast in 1859 by G. Mears at the Whitechapel Bell Foundry.

== Recent history ==
The church was declared redundant on 1 March 1979 and was vested in the Trust on 2 August 1989. After the church was declared redundant, the entrance doorway in the south porch was boarded up to prevent vandalism. This was considered to be unsightly, and the Churches Conservation Trust commissioned the design and construction of a set of gates. These are made in iron and have been painted in reddish-brown to complement Scott's design, and the cross and floral motifs have been gilded. At the same time, some conservation work was carried out to the surrounding stonework in the porch, and also around the west window. In 2007–08 the Trust carried out more extensive repairs to the church, including some re-roofing to make it weatherproof, and repairs to the stained glass windows and tracery.

The church is open to visitors at limited times and during events such as Heritage Open Days.

== See also ==
- Grade I listed buildings in West Yorkshire
- Grade I listed churches in West Yorkshire
- Listed buildings in Halifax, West Yorkshire
- List of new churches by George Gilbert Scott in Northern England
- List of churches preserved by the Churches Conservation Trust in Northern England
