= Scout Hall =

Coordinates: 53.7457°N 1.8575°W

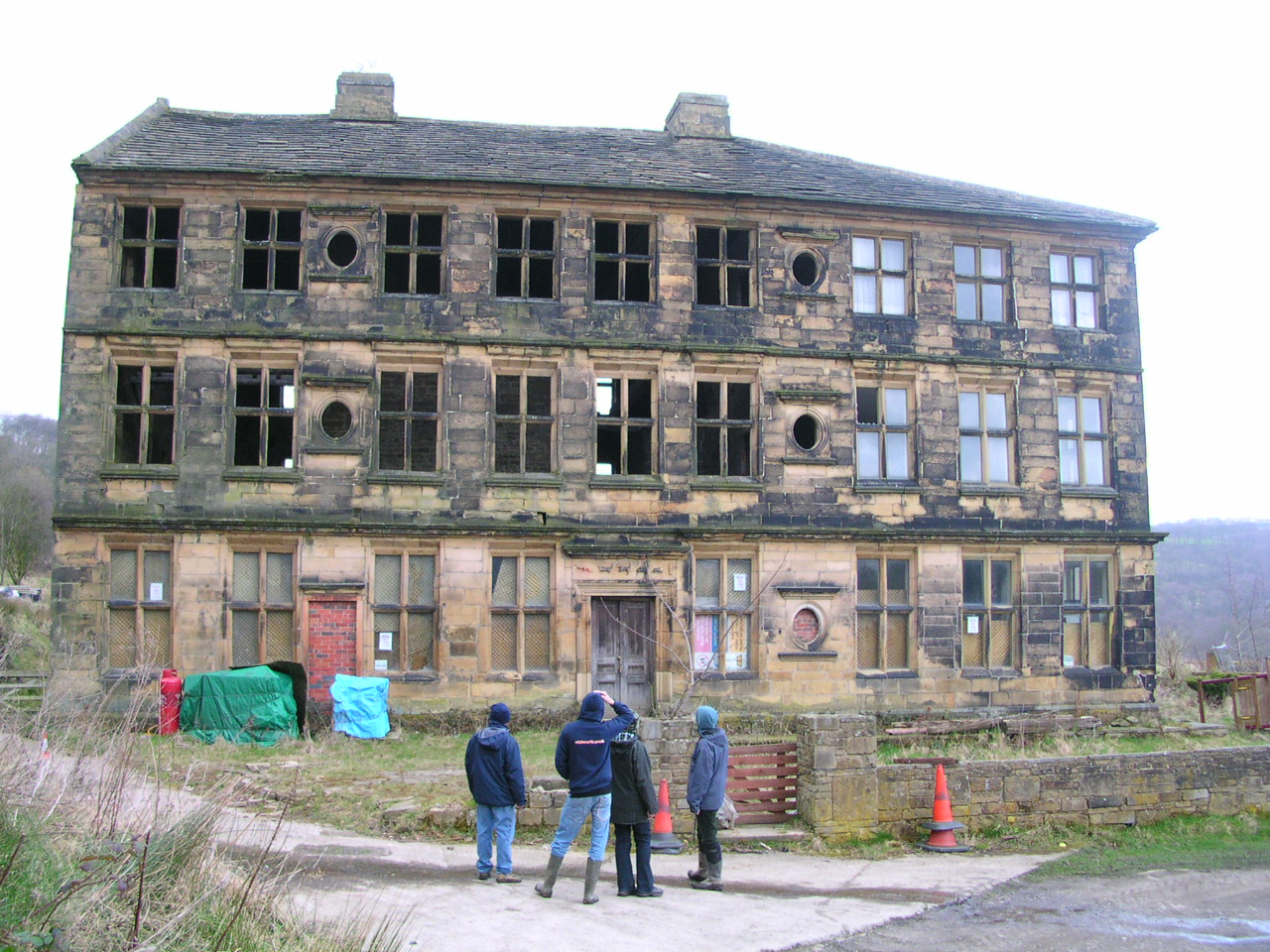
Scout Hall, Shibden Valley, Halifax

Scout Hall (also known as Scote Hall) at Shibden near Halifax, West Yorkshire, England, was built in 1680 for John Mitchell (1659–1696), who had inherited great wealth as a silk merchant. Mitchell was castigated by the preacher Oliver Heywood for his dissolute way of life, spending his money on horse racing and drink. The house is a 'calendar' building, supposedly of 12 bays, with 52 doors and 365 panes of glass. It is Grade II* listed but is on the English Heritage 'buildings at risk' register.

The standing Scout Hall was built on the site of several earlier houses of the same name, the ancestral homes of the Stancliff(e), Otes, Savile and Waterhouse families (Mitchell's wife was a Stancliff(e)). The name Stancliffe, or Stanclift, comes from the Old English for stone cliff. The large homes named Scout Hall were all built near the base of a large stone cliff and a quarry from which the building stones were harvested.

In 2010 it was put on the market for £350,000, and later withdrawn, but has reputedly been sold to someone who intends to restore it.
