= Northowram =

Village in West Yorkshire, England

Coordinates: 53.73499°N 1.824891°W

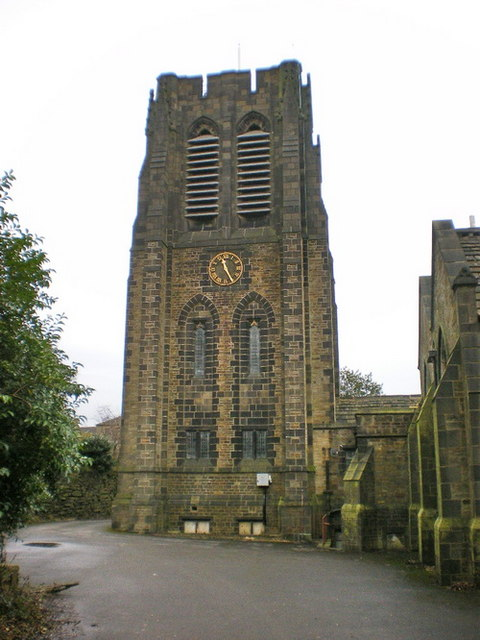
- Parish Church of St Matthew – tower

- Location within West Yorkshire
- OS grid reference: SE115265
- Metropolitan borough: Calderdale
- Metropolitan county: West Yorkshire
- Region: Yorkshire and the Humber
- Country: England
- Sovereign state: United Kingdom
- Post town: Halifax
- Postcode district: HX3
- Dialling code: 01422
- Police: West Yorkshire
- Fire: West Yorkshire
- Ambulance: Yorkshire

Northowram (/ˈnɔːrθɑːrəm/ nor-THAR-əm) is a village lying north-east of the town of Halifax in Calderdale, West Yorkshire, England. It stands on the north side of Shibden valley. Southowram stands on the southern side of the valley.

The name Owram derives from the plural form of the Old English ofer meaning 'a flat topped ridge'.

The village was mentioned as a settlement in the Domesday Book, within the Hundred of Morley, although there were no recorded inhabitants at that time. It was later documented in the 19th century as being in the parish of Halifax, 2 1/2 miles north-east of Halifax and 6 1/2 miles from Bradford. Its population at that point was 6,841 and Northowram Hall was the seat of J. F. Dyson, Esq. The ward is now called Northowram and Shelf. Following the 2021 census Northowram is defined by the Office for National Statistics as forming part of the Shelf and Northowram built-up area, which had a population of 9,195.

The village has three churches: St Matthew's Church of England parish church, a Methodist church (now closed), and a Heywood United Reformed Church. St Matthew's is a Grade II listed building which is constructed of snecked local sandstone with a graded stone-slate roof. The village has one school, Northowram Primary School.

The serial killer John Christie was born at Black Boy House near the village in 1899.

The village hosts an annual Scarecrow Festival.

== Governance ==
Northowram was historically a township in the ancient parish of Halifax. By 1866 part of the township was included in the borough boundaries of Halifax and another was included in the local government district of Queensbury. Early in 1866 the remainder of Northowram was declared to be its own local government district, administered by a local board. Later that year the whole township was made a civil parish. In 1891 the parish had a population of 20,517, of which 3,014 lived in the local government district of Northowram and the remainder lived in the parts of the parish within the borough of Halifax and the Queensbury district.

In 1894 local boards were reconstituted as urban district councils under the Local Government Act 1894, which also said that parishes could not straddle district boundaries. The parts of Northowram parish within the Halifax and Queensbury districts were transferred to those parishes, leaving a reduced Northowram parish covering just the urban district. The parish and urban district of Northowram was abolished on 9 November 1900, becoming part of the parish and county borough of Halifax. Halifax County Borough was abolished in 1974, becoming part of Calderdale. No successor parish was created for the former county borough and so Northowram is directly administered by Calderdale Council.

== See also ==
- Listed buildings in Northowram
