= Listed buildings in Halifax, West Yorkshire =

Halifax is a town in the metropolitan borough of Calderdale, West Yorkshire, England. It contains 254 listed buildings that are recorded in the National Heritage List for England. Of these, three are listed at Grade I, the highest of the three grades, 31 are at Grade II*, the middle grade, and the others are at Grade II, the lowest grade. The main industry of the town has been its cloth trade, which dates back to the 14th century, and grew particularly during the 19th century when the town increased considerably in size and prosperity. Of the listed buildings, there are relatively few dating from before the middle of the 18th century, with the great majority dating from between about 1825 and the end of the 19th century. There are many survivors from the cloth industry, especially mills that have been converted for other uses, particularly in the area of Dean Clough. A number of these former mills and associated structures are listed.

Some of the industrialists became very wealthy and used their wealth for philanthropic purposes, including creating buildings that have been listed, in particular Joseph and Francis Crossley and Edward Akroyd. The Crossley brothers each built a set of almshouses, Francis Crossley gave to the town the People's Park, which contains several listed buildings, and Edward Akroyd built the model village of Akroydon, most of which is listed, together with its church by G. G. Scott.

Of the other listed buildings, most are houses and associated structures, shops and markets, offices and banks, civic buildings, such as the Town Hall, public houses and hotels, schools, churches and chapels. The River Calder and the Calder and Hebble Navigation, with its Halifax Branch, run through the area, and listed buildings associated with these are bridges, locks, an aqueduct, and a lock keeper's house. Listed buildings associated with the railway are the Halifax railway station, a signal box, viaducts, bridges, a series of coal drops, an engine shed, and the portal to a tunnel. Other listed buildings include the remains of Halifax Gibbet, Piece Hall, a former cloth hall converted for other uses, warehouses, a former toll house, a cantilevered footpath and a weir, theatres and a former cinema, a drinking fountain, a former hospital, and statues and memorials, including a war memorial.

== Key ==
Grade	Criteria
I	Buildings of exceptional interest, sometimes considered to be internationally important
II*	Particularly important buildings of more than special interest
II	Buildings of national importance and special interest

== Buildings ==
Name and location	Photograph	Date	Notes	Grade
St John's Church (Halifax Minster); 53.72324°N 1.85382°W		Early 15th century	The church, which incorporates some 12th-century material, has been altered and extended through the centuries, and was restored in 1878–79 by George Gilbert Scott and John Oldrid Scott. It is built in stone with slate roofs, and consists of a nave, north and south aisles, north and south porches, a chancel with a clerestory, north and south chapels, and a west tower. The tower has four stages, angle buttresses, a west door with a pointed arch, a six-light Perpendicular west window, clock faces, and an embattled parapet with crocketed pinnacles. The parapets on the body of the church are mainly embattled with similar pinnacles, and under the chancel is a crypt with mullioned windows.	I
1 Woolshops; 53.72346°N 1.85913°W		Mid 15th century	Two houses, later combined and converted into a café, with the ground floor in stone, the upper parts plastered or timber framed, and a stone slate roof. There are three storeys and an attic, the upper storeys are both jettied, and each fronts has two gabled bays. The doorway is in the right bay of the ground floor of the south front, with a mullioned window to the left, and the other windows in this floor are modern. The middle floor of the west front and the left bay of the middle floor of the south front are plastered. The right bay of the south front contains a canted bay window with mullioned and transomed windows, and the other windows in both fronts are mullioned. The gables have shaped bargeboards.	II*
Sunny Bank Farmhouse; 53.71860°N 1.82316°W		Late 15th century	The farmhouse has a timber framed core, it is encased in stone, later rendered, and the roof is in stone slate. There are two storeys, a two-bay hall range, two cross-wings, the left wing gabled, and at the rear is a single-storey aisle. The windows are mullioned, the doorway has monolithic jambs, and there is a columbarium. Inside, much timber framing has survived.	II
Bank House; 53.69969°N 1.85685°W		16th century	The house has a timber framed core, and it was encased in stone and extended in the 17th century. It is painted on the front, and has a slate roof. The house consists of a single-storey range with flanking two-storey gabled cross-wings. In the central range is an arched doorway and a large mullioned and transomed window with a hood mould carved with human faces. In the south wing are mullioned windows and a doorway. Inside, much timber framing has survived.	II*
Law Farmhouse and barn 53.71445°N 1.83275°W	—	1618 (possible)	A stone house, rendered at the front, with a stone slate roof, it has two storeys, four bays, and mullioned windows. Built over a single-storey aisle at the rear is an 18th-century two-storey wing with quoins, a coped gable and kneelers, and attached to the house is a barn with a square-headed cart entry.	II
Old Cock Hotel; 53.72238°N 1.86050°W		Early 17th century	The hotel, which has been much altered, is in rendered stone, with three storeys and gabled stone roof. There is a 19th-century Doric portico, and it has retained some mullioned windows.	II
Dean House; 53.70171°N 1.86293°W		1645	A stone house, rendered on the front, with a stone roof, and two storeys. The doorway has an arched head, and above it are initials and the date. The windows are mullioned, and above the ground floor openings is a continuous hood mould.	II
Boothtown House and gate piers 53.73827°N 1.86854°W		17th century	A stone house with quoins and a stone roof. There are two storeys, and two gabled bays with finials. The central doorway has a round head, and above it is a blind panel. The windows are mullioned and transomed, stepped in the upper floor; they have hood moulds that are continuous over the ground floor openings. In front of the forecourt is a wall with moulded gate piers.	II
Exley Hall; 53.69512°N 1.84785°W	—	17th century	The house, which has been remodelled, is in stone, partly rendered, with a hipped stone roof. There are two storeys, and the windows have plain surrounds. In the east front is an arched doorway and mullioned windows.	II
Remains of Gibbet; 53.72376°N 1.86738°W		17th century (or earlier)	The remains consist of a square stone platform with a retaining wall and steps to the west. On it has been placed a replica of the guillotine.	II
Haugh Shaw Hall, House and Villa; 53.71595°N 1.87582°W	—	17th century	A house, divided into three, it is in stone, partly rendered, with a stone roof. There are two storeys at the front and one at the rear, and a three-storey east wing. On the front is a two-storey porch with a round-arched doorway and an elaborate gable. The windows are mullioned and transomed, containing in the main part casements and in the wing sashes.	II
Ivy House and barn 53.71574°N 1.82698°W	—	17th century	The buildings are in stone with a stone slate roof. The barn is the older part, it is aisled, it has a coped gable, and contains a square-headed cart entry. The house, which dates from the 18th century, forms a cross-wing, and has quoins, kneelers, two storeys and mullioned windows.	II
The Rookery; 53.70380°N 1.85280°W	—	17th century	A stone house, built against a hillside, it was altered in the 18th century. There are three storeys and four bays. The windows are mullioned, there is a stair window, and on the road front is an arched doorway.	II
Union Cross Inn; 53.72360°N 1.85982°W		17th century (probable)	The public house was extended to the rear in the 18th and 19th centuries, and refronted in the 20th century. It is in stone, partly painted, and has a slate roof. There are three storeys, two bays, the right bay containing a carriage entrance, and a rear wing. At the rear, above the carriage arch, is a mullioned window in each floor, and the wing contains sash windows.	II
Waske Hall; 53.70190°N 1.86301°W		17th century (probable)	A stone house with a stone roof that has been altered and subdivided. It has two storeys and a front with three gables and finials. Some of the windows are mullioned with decorative hood moulds, and others have been altered.	II
Part of house front, Burnley Road; 53.71476°N 1.88647°W	—	1654	The ground floor of a house front that has been incorporated into a retaining wall, it is in stone with quoins. In the centre is an arched doorway with a quoined surround, and above it is a datestone. The door is flanked by blocked five-light mullioned and transomed windows, and above them is a continuous hood mould with carvings.	II
2–5 Backhold Lane, Siddal; 53.70373°N 1.84829°W		1668	A stone house with a stone roof, it was later extended to the west. There are three storeys, and a front of three bays with gables and finials. The windows are mullioned with hood moulds, some also have transoms, and in the gables they are stepped, the lights with arched heads and sunk spandrels. Above these windows are ledges for dovecotes. The doorway on the front has an arched head, and above it is a carved and inscribed tablet. At the rear is a doorway with a dated and initialled lintel.	II*
Gateway, Wood Hall; 53.70506°N 1.87970°W	—	Late 17th century	At the entrance to the drive is a pair of gate piers formed out of the ends of the boundary wall. Each pier has a moulded cornice and a large ball finial.	II
Highfield Farmhouse and Cottage; 53.71406°N 1.83786°W	—	1677	A house divided into two and a barn back-to-back with possibly an earlier roof, the buildings are in rendered stone, and have a stone slate roof with coped gables and crocketed finials. The house has two storeys and three bays, and contains a doorway with a dated lintel and mullioned windows. The barn has five bays and a segmental-arched cart entry.	II
3–21 Marsh Lane, Bank Top; 53.70186°N 1.83819°W		1678	A house to which additions were made to the south in 1767 forming a courtyard plan. The north range has a through passage, and the doorway on its south front has a moulded surround and a depressed Tudor arched lintel with initials and a date. In the south range is a segmental-arched cart entry with a dated and initialled keystone, and a doorway with a pulvinated frieze. The east range has four bays and contains various openings, including a columbarium. Most of the windows are mulliond and some are also transomed.	II
Wood Hall; 53.70497°N 1.87934°W	—	1689	A stone house, rendered at the rear, with a stone roof, three storeys at the front and two at the rear. On the front are two wide gables with finials, and a two-storey gabled porch that has an arched entrance with dated shields in the spandrels. The outer bays contain five-light mullioned and transomed windows. There are gables on the side and at the rear, and a seven-light window on the east front.	II
Service buildings and dovecote, Wood Hall; 53.70523°N 1.87934°W	—	17th or 18th century	The buildings are in stone and arranged round a courtyard. The main building has two storeys, and contains a carriage door with a cambered arch and windows. The yard is enclosed by a wall with a doorway and a carriage gate, and to the south is a dovecote with a pyramidal roof, three arched openings, and a cornice.	II
1 Park Nook, Southowram; 53.70186°N 1.83819°W	—	Early 18th century	The house is built in thin Elland flags, it has a cornice and a hipped pantile roof. There are two storeys, two bays, a rear wing, and a lean-to outshut. The central doorway has monolithic jambs, and the windows are mullioned.	II
1 and 3 Savile Road; 53.71828°N 1.86373°W	—	Early 18th century	A stone house with a modillion eaves cornice, a stone roof, two storeys, and a front of five bays. in the centre is a doorway with a broken segmental pediment, to the left is a bay window, and the other windows are sashes. The front facing the road is plainer, with a central canted wing, and mullioned and transomed windows.	II
13–27 Woolshops; 53.72341°N 1.85805°W	—	Early 18th century	A row of stone shops with quoins and pilasters, and roofs of slate or stone slate. No. 13 has three storeys, and the other shops have two storeys. In the ground floor are modern shop fronts, and the upper floors contain a mix of sash and casement windows, some of which are mullioned. Between Nos. 23 and 25 is an arched carriage entrance with pilasters and a keystone and above it is scrolled decoration.	II
Hopwood Hall, wall and piers 53.72160°N 1.86510°W		Early 18th century	A stone house with a rusticated ground floor, an eaves cornice, and a hipped stone roof. There are three storeys and a symmetrical front of three bays. The central doorway has a segmental pediment on brackets, and the windows on the front are sashes. At the rear the windows are mullioned and transomed, and there is a recessed stair window with a rusticated arch. The retaining wall enclosing the front garden has a pair of rusticated piers with ball finials flanking the gateway, and there is a plainer pier to the left.	II
Former Sportsman Inn; 53.72349°N 1.86239°W		Early 18th century	The public house, later named the Gundog, was refronted in Baroque style in 1904, and is in stone with a slate roof. There are two storeys and an attic, and four bays, and at the ends are rusticated pilasters with dated cartouches on cornices. The doorway has a rusticated surround and a segmental pediment containing a painted carving, and to the sides are round-headed windows. The top floor has windows with architraves and keystones. At the top is an entablature, a modillion cornice, and a gable above the doorway, the other bays with flat-headed dormers.	II
Ashday Hall and attached buildings 53.70473°N 1.81942°W	—	1738	The house was altered at the front in about 1830, and is in stone with a cornice, chamfered rusticated quoins, and a two-span stone slate roof, hipped to the left. There are two storeys, a double-pile plan, and a symmetrical front of three bays, with an additional bay to the left. The central doorway has an architrave, a pulvinated frieze, and a cornice, and it is flanked by full-height semicircular bay windows. The left bay contains a Venetian window with a sash window above. At the rear is a doorway with Tuscan pilasters and a dated frieze. To the left is a further bay containing a round-headed carriage entrance, and a stable range at right angles with mullioned windows.	II
Friends Meeting House, wall and gravestones 53.72009°N 1.85913°W		1743	The Friends' meeting house is in sandstone with quoins and a stone slate roof with coped gables and kneelers. To the left is a two-storey two-bay range, and to the right is a taller four-bay hall. In the hall are three round-headed windows containing sashes and a round-headed doorway, and in the left range the windows have flat heads. The graveyard is enclosed by walls with capstones, and there are two piers with capstones. Lined along the northern perimeter wall are gravestones dating from 1821 to 1893.	II
Lewins Public House; 53.72182°N 1.86419°W		18th century (probable)	The public house is in stone on a plinth, with quoins, a band, bracketed eaves and a stone roof. There are three storeys and three bays. Steps lead up to a central doorway, above the ground floor is a fascia, and the windows vary in style, including mullioned windows in the top floor.	II
5–8 Ward's End; 53.72066°N 1.86008°W		1751	A house later a public house, consisting of a main block flanked by projecting gabled wings added in 1760–64, both parts with slate roofs. The main block was refaced in stone in the 19th century, and has two storeys, a symmetrical front of five bays, and a hipped roof. In the centre is a portico in Greek Doric style, and the round-headed doorway has a fanlight. The wings and links are in red brick with stone dressings, bands, and quoins. They have two storeys and attics and fronts of two bays. In the attics are Venetian windows, and the other windows in both parts are sashes.	II
Albany Club, 39 Clare Road and gate piers 53.71864°N 1.85829°W		Mid to late 18th century	A house with detached wings, the building is in stone with slate roofs. The main block has quoins, a modillion cornice, and a pediment containing an oculus, two storeys and a symmetrical front of five bays. In the centre is a portico with four Doric columns and a pediment, and a round-headed doorway with a fanlight and side lights, and above it is a Venetian window. The other windows are sashes, in the upper floor with cornices. At the rear is a rusticated basement, a Venetian window, and a lunette in the tympanum of the pediment. The wings are long with two low storeys, modillion cornices, and at the ends are circular windows and doorways with rusticated surrounds. At the entrances to the forecourt are two pairs of rusticated gate piers.	II*
Somerset House; 53.72211°N 1.86231°W		1766	The house has been extended, truncated, and converted for other uses. It is in sandstone with quoins, and has a roof of stone slate and some slate. The original part has two storeys, a central range, and projecting wings on both sides. The central range has a five-bay arcaded loggia of Doric columns in the ground floor, above are three bays containing sash windows, and over that is a modillion cornice with a balustraded parapet containing a festooned panel and an urn. The wings have three storeys and two bays. To the left is a 19th-century extension with three storeys, a central three-bay range, and an outer two-bay wing.	II*
Law Hill House; 53.71501°N 1.83752°W	—	c. 1771	A stone house with quoins, bands, and a stone slate roof. There are three storeys and a symmetrical front of three bays. The central doorway has an architrave and a cornice, and the windows are sashes, the window above the doorway with an architrave. Attached to the left hand return wall is a mounting block incorporating a dog kennel.	II
Congregational Sunday School (Square Chapel); 53.72165°N 1.85568°W		1771–72	Originally a chapel, later a Sunday school, it has been converted into an arts centre. It is in red brick with stone dressings on a plinth, and has a high parapet with panels and a plaque, and a pediment containing an oculus. The building is in Georgian style, and has two storeys, and a symmetrical front of five bays. Steps lead up to the central doorway that has engaged Doric columns and a pediment, and above it is a Venetian window with a keystone. The other windows in the upper floor have round heads, and those in the ground floor have flat heads.	II*
Piece Hall; 53.72188°N 1.85703°W		1774–79	Originally a cloth market and later converted for other uses, it is in sandstone with stone slate roofs. It forms an open rectangular courtyard with buildings of two and three storeys and cellars on a sloping site. Where there are three storeys, the ground floor forms an arcade of round-headed arches flanked by square piers with impost blocks. The upper floors form colonnades; in the lower floor they have square rusticated piers with Tuscan capitals, and in the upper floor they have round Tuscan columns, and over both are entablatures. There are staircases in each corner, and entrances in the middle of each range. Above the west entrance is an octagonal cupola with a weathervane.	I
39 Law Lane and adjacent block 53.71491°N 1.83778°W	—	Late 18th century	Originally a stable block, later cottages, they are in stone with quoins and stone slate roofs. There are two storeys and attics. In the gable end are bands, and a largely blocked Venetian window with impost blocks and a keystone. The main front and the gable end contain doorways, both with impost blocks and keystones, and on the front is a stair windows with mullions.	II
4–8 Park Nook, Southowram; 53.70195°N 1.83789°W		Late 18th century	A row of four cottages in stone with quoins, a parapet, and a stone slate roof. There are two storeys, each cottage has one bay, and there is a continuous outshut at the rear. The doorways have monolithic jambs, the windows are mullioned, and each cottage has a continuous lintel over the doorway and windows.	II
9–12 Park Nook, Southowram; 53.70172°N 1.83756°W	—	Late 18th century	A row of four cottages in stone with quoins, and a stone slate roof with a coped gable. There are two storeys, and each cottage has one bay. The doorways have monolithic jambs, the windows are mullioned, and they contain sashes.	II
21 (western part) and 23 Savile Road; 53.71769°N 1.86570°W		Late 18th century	A stone house with a modillion eaves cornice, parapets, and a hipped stone roof. There are three storeys, and the main front has seven bays and two further bays at each end. At the west end is a single-storey wing in brick and stone. In the centre is a doorway with a pair of engaged Doric columns and a pediment, and the windows are sashes. In the front facing the road the outer bays project, they have two bays and quoins, and each contains a Venetian window in the ground floor. The central doorway has a semicircular fanlight, side windows and an open pediment.	II
Upper George Yard Warehouse; 53.72302°N 1.86093°W	—	Late 18th century	The warehouse is in sandstone with quoins and a stone slate roof. There are five storeys and six bays. The openings, some of which are blocked, include windows, doorways, one in the first floor with a hood on scrolled brackets, and altered loading doors.	II
Upper Marsh Farmhouse and barn 53.71534°N 1.84041°W	—	Late 18th century	A pair of mirror-image cottages and an attached barn, they are in stone with stone slate roofs, coped gables, and moulded kneelers. The cottages have two storeys and one bay each, a doorway with monolithic jambs and windows with the mullions removed. They are linked to the barn on the right that has an elliptical-arched cart entry, a lunette above, doorways, a square window, and a circular window to the right.	II
Wakefield Road Bridge; 53.69872°N 1.85693°W		Late 18th century (probable)	The bridge carries Wakefield Road (A6026 road) over the Halifax branch of the Calder and Hebble Navigation. It is in stone, and consists of a single elliptical arch. The bridge has voussoirs, a string course, and flush copings, and at the ends are piers.	II
Westfield Gate Farmhouse and barn 53.70380°N 1.84057°W	—	Late 18th century	A laithe house in stone with stone slate roofs. The house, originally two cottages, has a coped gable with moulded kneelers. There are two storeys, two doorways with monolithic jambs, and mullioned windows. The barn is at right angles, and contains an elliptical-headed cart entrance with impost blocks and a keystone.	II
Salterhebble Middle Lock; 53.69787°N 1.85774°W		c. 1779	The chamber of the lock on the Calder and Hebble Navigation and the wing walls are in stone. There are double timber gates and timber balance beams at each end.	II
Salterhebble Top Lock; 53.69838°N 1.85726°W		c. 1779	The chamber of the lock on the Calder and Hebble Navigation is in stone, and the wing walls are in concrete and stone. There are double timber gates and timber balance beams at each end.	II
Former Holy Trinity Church; 53.71979°N 1.86334°W		1795–98	The church, now redundant and converted for other uses, is in Neoclassical style. It is built in stone with quoins and a hipped slate roof. There are two storeys, and the church consists of a nave, a chancel, and a south tower. The main front has a high rusticated plinth containing a lunette, and above, it is flanked by Ionic pilasters and a pediment. These enclose two unfluted Ionic columns behind which is a window with Ionic colonnettes, and above the window is a lunette. The outer bays each contains a doorway with a rusticated surround, above which is a window with an architrave, Ionic pilasters, and a segmental pediment. The tower has a doorway, a sash window, niches, and an oculus. The upper stage is octagonal with round-headed windows and lunettes, and at the top is a lead-covered dome, a ball finial and cross.	II
85–105 Northgate; 53.72635°N 1.86020°W		c. 1800	A parade of shops and offices that originated as a house at the north end, with three further blocks being added to the north between 1845 and 1847. The buildings are in stone with slate roofs, and have three storeys. The details vary, and include two archways, shop fronts, some modern, and a variety of windows.	II
Bankfield Museum and wall 53.73253°N 1.86332°W		c. 1800	The earliest part is the west wing, and the house was extended in the 1850s, followed by a major extension in 1867 into a mansion in Italianate style. It is in stone with hipped slate roofs. The main part has two storeys and a rusticated basement, seven bays, pilasters, and a porte-cochère. Behind is a belvedere tower, and to the left is a three-storey link to the original wing, which has three storeys and one bay. The windows have round heads, and to the east of the forecourt is a screen wall with a bowed centre.	II
The Westgate Public House; 53.72165°N 1.85827°W		c. 1800	Two houses with a weaving wing combined into a public house, with a pub front added later. It is in stone on a plinth with a stone slate roof. There are three storeys and a cellar, four bays on Westgate, and two on Union Street, and the windows are sashes. The pub front has a door on the left and two windows, with pilasters and carved brackets carrying a Gothic hood with a hood mould.	II
21–25 Hall Street North; 53.73800°N 1.86791°W	—	Late 18th to early 19th century	A range of three houses in stone with quoins and a stone roof. There are two storeys, and on the front are two doorways, and two five-light windows in each floor, the middle light taller and round-arched. The right return is gabled and contains a doorway and windows, all with plain surrounds.	II
2 and 4 King Cross Street; 53.72138°N 1.86522°W		Late 18th to early 19th century	The building is in stone with quoins, a cornice, and a stone roof. There are two storeys, a pedimented front of three bays, and an extension to the south. The doorway and windows have plain surrounds, and in the pediment is an oculus.	II
37–55 Salisbury Place, Akroydon; 53.73440°N 1.86766°W		Late 18th to early 19th century	A terrace of ten houses stepped in pairs down a hill. They are in stone with quoins and slate roofs, and each house has two storeys and one bay. The openings have quoined surrounds, the doorways are to the left and each has a segmental head, a fanlight, and a hood mould, and in each floor is a two-light window.	II
Garden house, 27 Savile Road; 53.71682°N 1.86675°W	—	Late 18th to early 19th century	The building in the garden is in stone and has a square plan. There is one storey, it has an embattled parapet, and contains two Gothic doorways flanked by niches.	II
2 and 4 West Parade; 53.71979°N 1.86622°W	—	Late 18th to early 19th century	A pair of stone houses with an eaves cornice and a stone roof. There are three storeys and a basement, and five bays, the middle three bays projecting under a pediment with a segmental-arched recess in the middle bay. The openings have plain surrounds, and steps lead up to the doorways. In the right return are two bays, and a full-height canted bay window.	II
West House; 53.71862°N 1.87308°W		Late 18th to early 19th century	A stone house with an eaves cornice, and a hipped slate roof, it is in Georgian style. There are two storeys and a symmetrical front of five bays, with a pediment over the middle three bays. The central doorway has engaged columns and a segmental pediment, and is flanked by bow windows with pilasters and an entablature. The windows are sashes, and there is a later entrance with pilasters and an arcade on the east front.	II
Wesley Methodist Church, Southowram; 53.70864°N 1.82553°W		1806	The chapel, which was enlarged in 1890, has since been converted into residential accommodation. It is in stone with a stone slate roof, and has two storeys. The windows in the upper storey are round-headed with keystones, and in the lower storey they have flat heads. The north front has three bays and a half-hipped gable, there are seven bays along the sides, and a lower wing at the south. In the east front is a double doorway with a fanlight and a cornice on consoles.	II
Church of St. Anne in the Grove; 53.70926°N 1.81908°W		1815	The church, designed by Thomas Taylor, is in Early English style. The chancel was extended in 1869 and the baptistry was added in 1884–85. The church consists of a nave, a chancel, a polygonal baptistry, and a west tower. The tower has three stages, diagonal buttresses, and an embattled parapet with crocketed pinnacles. The nave and chancel are also embattled. Inside there is a west gallery.	II
Bus Station, Eastern Section; 53.72493°N 1.85763°W		1819	Originally the façade of Syon Congregational Chapel, it was altered and incorporated into the bus station in 1989. It is in stone, and has three bays, the middle bay forming a recessed entrance with four fluted Doric columns carrying a frieze and an entablature with a window. The outer bays form slightly projecting pavilions, each containing a doorway and a Diocletian window above, all in a recessed arch. In the returns are round-arched windows.	II
Salterhebble Lock House; 53.69839°N 1.85748°W		c. 1820	The lock keeper's house is in stone with end pilasters, a parapet, and a hipped stone slate roof. There are two storeys built into a hillside, and a T-shaped plan. The entrance is in the upper floor, it has a pointed lead hood, and is flanked by casement windows.	II
12–16 Carlton Street, walls and gate piers 53.72061°N 1.86444°W	—	1820–30	A terrace of three houses in yellow brick with stone slate roofs and two storeys. The doorways have moulded surrounds with paterae, fanlights, and shallow hoods. No. 16 has three bays, and sash windows, and Nos. 12 and 14 have two bays each and replacement windows. In front of the forecourts are low stone walls with domed copings and panelled piers.	II
Former Sunday school, Southowram; 53.70711°N 1.82931°W		1825	The Methodist Sunday school, later converted for residential use, is in stone with a stone slate roof. There is one storey and seven bays. The doorway and windows have plain surrounds, and above the door is a tablet with the date and an inscription.	II
Old Lane Mill, (Rawson's Mill); 53.73343°N 1.87086°W		1825–28	The former worsted mill is in stone with a corrugated asbestos roof, and is Classical in style. There are six storeys and an attic, and an L-shaped plan, consisting of a main block with sides of 15 and five bays, and a four-bay pedimented wing with a clock face. In the south front is a tall segmental-arched engine house window, and in the wing is a large loading entrance, both openings with rusticated surrounds. Elsewhere there are windows and loading doors.	II*
6 and 8 King Cross Street; 53.72126°N 1.86557°W	—	Early 19th century	A pair of offices in stone on a plinth, with quoins, a modillion eaves cornice, and a hipped roof partly in stone and partly slated. There are two storeys and eight bays. The doorway to the left has a triangular pediment on consoles, and the doorway to the right has a plain surround. The windows are sashes with plain surrounds.	II
17 and 19 Savile Road; 53.71783°N 1.86526°W	—	Early 19th century	A pair of stone houses with a sill band, a moulded eaves cornice, and a blue slate roof. There are two storeys, the doorways have plain surrounds and fanlights, and the windows are sashes.	II
7 and 9 St James Street; 53.72459°N 1.86451°W	—	Early 19th century	A pair of stone houses flanked by pairs of Doric pilasters, with a cornice, a parapet, and a slate roof. There are two storeys and six bays, the middle two bays projecting slightly. In the middle bay of each house is a doorway with a fanlight flanked by pilasters with carved capitals, and the windows are sashes.	II
Bankfield Farmhouse; 53.71755°N 1.84106°W	—	Early 19th century (probable)	A stone house with quoins, a band, a cornice, and a hipped stone slate roof. There are two storeys and a symmetrical front of five bays, the middle bay projecting slightly under a pediment. In the middle bay is a two-storey canted bay window. The openings have plain surrounds, and the windows are casements.	II
Copley Bridge Toll House; 53.69750°N 1.87368°W		Early 19th century	The former toll house is in stone with a scalloped eaves board, a hipped stone slate roof, and has an elongated octagonal plan. There is one storey, the windows have been replaced, and on the front facing the road is a toll board.	II
Former Church School; 53.72301°N 1.85460°W		Early 19th century (probable)	The school, later used for other purposes, is in stone with a slate roof, and an embattled parapet with crocketed pinnacles, and is in Gothic style. There is one storey and a semi-basement, and eleven bays, three of which are gabled, the middle one the largest. The windows are mullioned and transomed, in the semi-basement they are semicircular, and above they have flat heads, other those in the gabled bays, which have pointed heads. There is a continuous hood mould above these windows.	II
Harrison House; 53.72084°N 1.86307°W	—	Early 19th century	A house on a corner site, later used for other purposes, it is in stone on a plinth, and has two storeys and a basement, a front of five bays, and three bays on the left return. The bays are divided by giant Doric pilasters carrying an entablature with a deep frieze. In the centre is a doorway with a fanlight, and the windows are sashes in architraves.	II
Kiry Leas	—	Early 19th century	A stone house with an eaves cornice and a hipped slate roof. There are two storeys and five bays, the middle three bays projecting under a pediment. The round-arched doorway has a fanlight and side lights, and the ground floor windows have arched heads.	II
Savile Hall School; 53.71718°N 1.86834°W	—	Early 19th century	A house with an older wing, at one time a school, and later used for other purposes, it is in stone with a hipped stone roof. There are two storeys, five bays, and a one-bay extension to the south. On the front is a portico with paired Doric columns and a pediment. The windows are a mix of sashes and casements, and above the central window is a pediment.	II
Boiler house and chimney, Old Lane Mill; 53.73352°N 1.87116°W		1827–28	The former boiler house is in stone, with two storeys and fronts of three and five bays. The ground floor is rusticated and contains three round-arched openings, now blocked. The integral chimney is circular on a square coped base.	II*
Aqueduct; 53.70614°N 1.85170°W	—	1828	The aqueduct, now disused, carried the Halifax Branch of the Calder and Hebble Navigation over Hebble Brook. It is in stone, and consists of two segmental skew arches. The aqueduct has rusticated voussoirs, bands, and a parapet. At the ends are piers, curved abutments, and further end piers.	II
Shaw Lodge Mill Warehouse and Mills; 53.71405°N 1.85448°W		1830	A warehouse and two spinning mills for the production of worsted, the mills date from 1830 and 1850, and the warehouse from 1862. They are built in gritstone, and the warehouse has a dentilled parapet. At the southeast corner of the warehouse is a privy block in Italianate style with a pyramidal slate roof. It contains string courses, and round-headed windows.	II*
Cantilevered footpath and weir 53.71942°N 1.85324°W		c. 1830	The footpath runs along the east side of Hebble Brook and is cantilevered for a section. To the north is a weir and a sluice with its machinery intact.	II
Playhouse Theatre, gateway and railing 53.72099°N 1.86696°W		1834	Original a Methodist chapel, it was converted into a theatre in 1945. It is in stone and has a front of two storeys and three bays, with flanking strip pilasters, a central pediment, and a central Greek Doric portico. The windows in the upper storey are round-headed, and in the lower floor they have flat heads. The forecourt is enclosed by low stone walls, with spear-headed iron railings on the east side. At the entrance are two square stone gate piers with cornices, and there is a plainer end pier.	II
10 Carlton Street; 53.72066°N 1.86415°W		Early to mid 19th century	The building is in painted stone, and is in Greek Revival style. There is one storey and three bays, with Doric pilasters in each bay. The doorway is in the centre, it is flanked by narrow windows, and there are three similar windows in each outer bay. Above is a blocking course, and over each bay is a pediment, the central pediment with a wreath flanked by scrolled consoles.	II
2–8 Clare Road, 4 Wards End, and 2 St John's Lane; 53.72062°N 1.85970°W	—	Early to mid 19th century	A row of six stone houses on a plinth with quoins, a sill band, an eaves cornice, and a hipped slate roof. There are three storeys, each house has two bays, and there is an additional bay over the archway. The doorways and archway have Doric half-columns, and are set in arched recesses. The windows in the middle floor are sashes and in the top floor they are casements, and at the north end is a shop front.	II
1 and 3 Harrison Road; 53.72126°N 1.86275°W	—	Early to mid 19th century	A pair of stone houses, later offices, on a corner site, with bracketed eaves and a stone roof, hipped on the left. There are three storeys, No. 1 has a front of three bays with two bays on the left return, and No. 3 has a front of two bays. The doorways have simple cornices.	II
5 and 7 Harrison Road; 53.72114°N 1.86272°W	—	Early to mid 19th century	A pair of stone houses with a blocking course and a cornice. There are three storeys and each house has two bays. Steps lead up to the doorways that have pilasters and cornices, and the windows are sashes.	II
6 and 8 Harrison Road; 53.72100°N 1.86302°W	—	Early to mid 19th century	A pair of houses, later offices, in stone, with a blocking course and a cornice. There are three storeys and basement and four bays. Steps lead up to the doorways, each in an Ionic portico, and with a fanlight. The windows are sashes, and the basement area is enclosed by railings with spear finials.	II
13 and 15 Harrison Road; 53.72033°N 1.86272°W	—	Early to mid 19th century	A pair of stone houses, later offices, with a cornice. There are three storeys and each house has two bays. Steps lead up to the doorways in the left bays; they have pilasters, patterned fanlights, and cornices. The windows in the lower two floors are sashes, and in the top floor they are top-opening casements.	II
4 Hopwood Lane; 53.72157°N 1.86523°W		Early to mid 19th century	A stone building with a cornice and a blocking course, and a slate roof. There is one storey and three bays. In the middle bay is a projecting porch with a triangular pediment, and in each outer bay is a window with a cornice.	II
Mortuary Chapel, General Cemetery; 53.72280°N 1.87456°W	—	Early to mid 19th century	The chapel is in stone with a slate roof. On the east front are Doric pilasters and a pediment.	II
Savile Terrace; 53.71555°N 1.87319°W	—	Early to mid 19th century	A terrace of five stone houses in Regency style. There are three storeys, and each house has three bays. The doorways have pilasters, and along the first floor is a balcony with decorative railings. In the centre is a cornice with an inscription.	II
Water siphon 53.73289°N 1.87063°W	—	Early to mid 19th century	The water siphon is in gritstone with a metal cover and grate. The stone forms a raised circle, and there is an inner circle over a stone-lined circular shaft.	II
Stone Dam Mills; 53.72480°N 1.85445°W		c. 1836	A worsted spinning mill, later used for other purposes, it is in sandstone with a stone slate roof. There are five storeys and attics, and 18 bays with a stair tower. At the east end is an incorporated engine house that has a tall round-headed window with a rusticated surround, and in the east gable end is a Venetian window.	II
Crossley's Mill, Dean Clough; 53.72799°N 1.86148°W		1830s	A former warehouse later used for other purposes, it is in sandstone with a slate roof. There are three storeys and twelve bays. The building contains entrance doors, loading doors, and small-paned windows.	II
Fearnley's Mill, Dean Clough; 53.72784°N 1.86116°W		1830s	The former mill is in sandstone with a slate roof and it has a slightly trapezoid plan. There are four storeys and a basement, and 14 bays. It contains small-paned windows, doorways and loading doors, and at the rear is a covered footbridge to Crossley's Mill.	II
Carlton United Reformed Church; 53.72049°N 1.86268°W		1837	The church is in stone with sill bands, a moulded eaves cornice, and a hipped slate roof. There are two storeys and a semi-basement, a front of four bays, and sides of five bays. On the front are two doorways with panelled architraves and cornices, and between them is a Venetian window. At the top is a chimney stack with decorated surrounds. The windows in the lower storey have flat heads, and in the upper storey they have round-arched heads.	II
Railings and gate piers, Carlton United Reformed Church; 53.72064°N 1.86268°W	—	1837	The forecourt of the church is enclosed by dwarf walls with railings. There are two pairs of panelled stone gate piers with cornices. The railings have spear heads, and scrolled volutes buttressing the piers.	II
Copley Railway Bridge; 53.70081°N 1.87771°W	—	c. 1840	The bridge was designed by George Stephenson for the Manchester and Leeds Railway Company to carry its line over the River Calder. It is in sandstone, and consists of three segmental arches. The bridge has piers on plinths with moulding, a band at impost level, rusticated voussoirs, keystones, a cornice, and a parapet. The abutments are curved and ramped.	II
A and B Mills, Dean Clough; 53.72897°N 1.86531°W		1841	A second mill was added in 1844, and they have since been converted for other uses. The building is in millstone grit with slate roofs. The main block has six storeys and symmetrical front of 22 bays, the middle four bays projecting under a pediment on brackets, and at the ends are gabled wings with three bays projecting by two bays. Further to the right is a six-bay extension and a recessed four-storey block formerly the fire station. The central bay of the projecting wings contains loading door and in each gable is a round window.	II
Marshall's Mill, Dean Clough; 53.72706°N 1.86118°W		1843	A former warehouse in sandstone with quoins, and a stone slate roof with moulded kneelers. There are four storeys and an attic, fronts of eight and four bays, and a single-storey rear extension in brick with a corrugated iron roof. The windows are sashes, some of which are blocked, and in the gable attic is a Venetian window. The main doorway has a capital and a moulded lintel.	II
Calder Terrace, Copley; 53.69883°N 1.87398°W	—	1840s	A terrace of 36 back-to-back houses in stone on a chamfered plinth, with a slate roof. There are two storeys, each house has one bay, and the end houses project and have coped gables. The doorways have chamfered surrounds and Tudor arches, the windows are mullioned and transomed, and on each front are eight gabled dormers. The garden walls are in sandstone and have triangular copings.	II
61–96 Railway Terrace, Copley; 53.69906°N 1.87376°W	—	1840s	A terrace of 36 back-to-back houses in stone on a chamfered plinth, with a slate roof. There are two storeys, each house has one bay, and the end houses project and have coped gables. The doorways have chamfered surrounds and Tudor arches, the windows are mullioned and transomed, and on each front are eight gabled dormers. The garden walls are in sandstone and have triangular copings.	II
97–136 Railway Terrace, Copley; 53.69953°N 1.87517°W	—	1840s	A terrace of 40 back-to-back houses in stone on a chamfered plinth, with a slate roof. There are two storeys, each house has one bay, and the end houses project and have coped gables. The doorways have chamfered surrounds and Tudor arches, the windows are mullioned and transomed, and on each front are two gabled dormers. The garden walls are in sandstone and have triangular copings.	II
149–160 Railway Terrace, Copley; 53.70002°N 1.87637°W	—	1840s	A terrace of twelve stone houses on a chamfered plinth, with a slate roof that has quoined and coped gables with kneelers. There are two storeys, and each house has one bay. The doorways have chamfered surrounds and Tudor arches, the windows are mullioned and transomed, and five of the houses have gabled dormers.	II
137–148 St Stephen's Street, Copley; 53.69994°N 1.87648°W	—	1840s	A terrace of twelve stone houses on a chamfered plinth, with a slate roof that has quoined and coped gables with kneelers. There are two storeys, and each house has one bay. The doorways have chamfered surrounds and Tudor arches, the windows are mullioned and transomed, and five of the houses have gabled dormers. The garden walls are in sandstone and have triangular copings.	II
Mill House, Dean Clough; 53.72873°N 1.86408°W	—	c. 1840s	An office and residential accommodation in stone with a modillion cornice, bands, and a hipped slate roof. It is on sloping land and has two and three storeys, and a front of seven bays. The main doorway has a plain architrave and a rectangular fanlight. The windows vary, and include sashes, small-paned windows, and mullioned windows.	II
Steeple, former St Paul's Church; 53.71510°N 1.88300°W		1845–47	The church was designed by R. D. Chantrell in Gothic style, and the body of the church was demolished in 1931. The steeple is in stone. and has a tower with three stages, stepped angle buttresses, a clock face on the south, and a broach spire with two tiers of lucarnes.	II
Bus Station, Central Section; 53.72469°N 1.85844°W		1846	Originally the façade of Syon School, later forming part of the bus station, it is in stone with a stone slate roof. There is a single storey, and seven bays divided by Doric pilasters. In the centre is a porch with a round-arched entrance and a keystone, and above it is a belvedere tower, the lower stage with consoles and an inscribed plaque, the upper stage with round arches, and at the top a pyramidal roof. The other bays contain round-arched windows with keystones, and outside them on each side is a niche.	II
Shaw Lodge Mill Weaving Sheds and Clock Tower; 53.71362°N 1.85490°W		1847	The weaving sheds were extended in 1852, and the clock tower and offices were added in 1876, and they are built in gritstone. The clock tower has four stages, chamfered corners and a pyramidal slate roof. It contains a semicircular arched entrance with a rusticated and vermiculated surround, a carved keystone, and a dentilled cornice. The second stage contains triple round-arched windows with Ionic columns and pilasters, in the third stage is a circular clock face with a dentilled string course above, and in the top stage are double round-arched windows with a dentilled cornice above. The adjacent offices have two storeys.	II*
Halifax Railway Viaduct; 53.72237°N 1.85174°W		1848–50	The viaduct was built by the Lancashire and Yorkshire Railway to carry its line over Bailey Hall Road. It is in stone, it is curved, and consists of nine round-headed arches and one segmental-headed arch, all with voussoirs and moulded imposts. Three arches are blocked.	II
Bowling Dyke Mill, Dean Clough; 53.72822°N 1.86237°W		1849	The mill, which was extended in 1851, is in stone with slate roofs. There are six storeys at the front and four at the rear, the original range has 19 bays, and the extension has 17 bays. At the rear are four horseshoe-shaped towers containing stairs and toilets. The openings include small-paned windows, doorways, some with arched heads, and loading doors.	II
The warehouse at Eureka; 53.71774°N 1.85621°W	—	c. 1849	The warehouse was built by the Lancashire and Yorkshire Railway, it is in sandstone, and has slate roofs. The main part is curved and has one storey and eight bays, to the south is a two-storey section with five bays, and to the right of this is a two-storey office extension with a pediment. The warehouse contains round-arched multi-paned windows, square-headed windows with mullions, a railway entrance, and cart entrances, some with decorative cast iron lintels.	II
Western Portal to Beacon Hill Railway Tunnel; 53.72295°N 1.85033°W	—	1849	The tunnel was built by the Lancashire and Yorkshire Railway, and is in stone, and in Neo-Norman style. The portal consists of a round arch containing two circular piers carrying a double arch; the outer arch has beakhead moulding and the inner arch has dogtooth moulding. The portal is flanked by hexagonal turrets containing arrow slits, and at the top is a parapet on small round arches with corbels.	II
23–27 Boothtown Road and rear premises 53.73378°N 1.86534°W		Mid 19th century	A stable block, later shops, the building is in stone with a stone slate roof and is in Gothic style. There are two storeys and seven bays. In the centre is an archway with a pointed head and a tower with an octagonal turret, both embattled. The outer bays are gabled, with shop fronts in the ground floor and mullioned windows above. The bays between also have shop fronts, and above are slit windows. At the rear is a single-storey extension.	II
29–37 Boothtown Road, Akroydon; 53.73378°N 1.86534°W	—	Mid 19th century	A symmetrical row of five houses in stone with slate roofs. They have two storeys, basements and attics, and each house has one bay, the outer bays wider. Steps lead up the doorways that have heads with different styles of arches and hood moulds. The windows are sashes; those in the ground floor are tripartite, and have hood moulds that rise to form a tympanum containing carved decoration. The middle three houses have gabled dormers, and in the apices of the outer gables are quatrefoils.	II
8–12 Crossley Street and 1 and 3 Wesley Court; 53.72413°N 1.86111°W	—	Mid 19th century	A block of stone shops and houses with a bracketed cornice above the third floor. There are four storeys, five bays on Crossley Street, and seven on Wesley Court. In the ground floor of Crossly Street are two modern shop fronts, and the other two bays are rusticated. The openings in the ground floor are round-arched with keystones. On the corner is a curved doorway with pilasters, carving in the spandrels, and an entablature, above which is a coat of arms. The windows in the first floor on Crossley Street have cornices, and in the second floor they have bracketed sills.	II
1–5 Deal Street; 53.72050°N 1.85611°W		Mid 19th century	A group of wool warehouses, later used for other purposes, they are in stone on a plinth, with some brick at the rear, and have slate roofs with stone gable copings. The warehouses are in three and four storeys, and have sides of seven and 19 bays. Each warehouse has a central gabled loading bay, the loading doors have wedge lintels, and the windows have small panes and fixed lights.	II
9 and 11 Ferguson Street, 4 and 6 Carlton Street; 53.72080°N 1.86373°W	—	Mid 19th century	A group of houses, later offices, on a corner site, they are in stone with an eaves cornice, and a hipped stone roof. There are three storeys, and the windows are sashes. On Carton Street there are four bays and two Corinthian porticos. The houses on Ferguson Street have five bays, and there are three doorways with pilasters, entablatures and cornices.	II
2 Harrison Road; 53.72117°N 1.86305°W	—	Mid 19th century	A house in Classical style, it is in stone, with storey bands, and a bracketed cornice. There are three storeys and a basement, and three bays. Steps lead up to the round-headed doorway in the left bay, that has panelled pilasters, applied columns, a fanlight, and a cornice on decorative consoles. The windows are sashes, with round heads in the ground floor, and flat heads in architraves above.	II
11 and 11A Harrison Road; 53.72082°N 1.86273°W	—	Mid 19th century	A pair of stone houses, later offices, with a cornice and a slate roof, in Classical style. There are two storeys and six bays. The doorway in the first bay has a cornice on consoles, and in the fourth bay is a portico with Doric columns and a triangular pediment. The windows in the ground floor have cornices on consoles, and those in the upper floor have triangular pediments.	II
6–24 Salisbury Place, Akroydon; 53.73495°N 1.86663°W		Mid 19th century	A row of ten houses in Gothic style, in pairs stepping down a hill. They are in stone with slate roofs, and have two storeys and two bays each. Above the doorways are shaped hood moulds containing shields with the owners' initials. Some of the windows have retained their mullions.	II
26–40 Salisbury Place, Akroydon; 53.73470°N 1.86737°W	—	Mid 19th century	A row of eight houses in Gothic style, in pairs stepping down a hill. They are in stone with slate roofs, and have two storeys and two bays each. Above the doorways are shaped hood moulds containing shields with the owners' initials. Some of the windows have retained their mullions.	II
42–60 Salisbury Place, Akroydon; 53.73447°N 1.86814°W	—	Mid 19th century	A row of ten stone houses with quoins and stone slate roofs. There are two storeys, each cottage has two bays, and the openings have quoined surrounds. The houses are paired; two pairs are recessed, the other pairs project with the right house gabled and a quatrefoil in the gable. The doorways in the recessed houses have plain surrounds, and over the doorways of the projecting houses are arched hood moulds and a trefoil. Some of the windows have retained their mullions and transoms.	II
62 and 64 Salisbury Place, Akroydon; 53.73430°N 1.86868°W	—	Mid 19th century	A pair of stone houses with quoins and a slate roof, the roof of No. 64 is gabled. There are two storeys and basements, and each house has one bay. The doorways have arched heads and hood moulds, and there are straight hood moulds over the ground floor windows. No. 64 has retained its mullions in the upper floor windows.	II
1–15 Trinity Place; 53.71931°N 1.86449°W		Mid 19th century	A terrace of stone houses with an eaves fascia and hipped slate roofs. Most houses have two storeys and basements; Nos. 7–9 also have a third storey. Nos. 3 and 4 and 11/12 have open pediments containing circular windows. The doorways have pilasters and cornices, and some have fanlights.	II
1–8 York Terrace, Akroydon; 53.73397°N 1.86842°W	—	Mid 19th century	A row of eight stone houses with quoins and slate roofs. They have two storeys and basements, and each house has a single gabled bay. The openings have quoined surrounds and hood moulds, and steps lead up to the doorways that are arched with fanlights. Some windows have retained their mullions.	II
9–16 York Terrace, Akroydon; 53.73351°N 1.86815°W	—	Mid 19th century	A row of eight stone houses with quoins and slate roofs. They have two storeys and basements, and each house has a single gabled bay. The openings have quoined surrounds and hood moulds, and steps lead up to the doorways that are arched with fanlights. Some windows have retained their mullions and transoms.	II
17–22 York Terrace, Akroydon; 53.73311°N 1.86794°W	—	Mid 19th century	A row of eight stone houses with quoins and slate roofs. They are in Gothic style, they have two storeys and basements, and each house has a single gabled bay. The openings have quoined surrounds and hood moulds, and steps lead up to the doorways that are arched with fanlights. Some windows have retained their mullions.	II
51 Boothtown Road and 2 and 4 Salisbury Place, Akroydon; 53.73514°N 1.86609°W		1851	A shop and two houses on a corner site, they are in stone with slate roofs, and are in Gothic style. The shop has two storeys and an attic, and two bays, the left bay gabled and with a finial to the right. In the ground floor is a shop front, and the upper floor contains mullioned and transomed windows, the window in the left bay with a decorated and inscribed arch. In the left return is a blind arcade, above which is a window, and a Venetian window in the gabled attic. The houses in Salisbury Place have three storeys and one gabled bay each. The doorways have a trefoil in their arched heads, the windows are mullioned and transomed, and in the top floor are tripartite window with arched lights, and trefoils above.	II
Lodge to Banksfield Museum; 53.73108°N 1.86345°W		c. 1851	The lodge is in stone with bracketed eaves and a slate roof, and is in Italianate style. There are two storeys, and an entrance portico with an arcade of two arches. The windows are sashes, some with round heads.	II
Copley Viaduct; 53.70143°N 1.87732°W		c. 1851	The viaduct was built by the Lancashire and Yorkshire Railway to carry its line over the River Calder, the Calder and Hebble Navigation, and Wakefield Road (A6026 road). It is in sandstone and consists of 23 arches, 15 of them semicircular, and the others segmental. The viaduct has voussoirs, bands at the impost and cornice levels, and a parapet.	II
Axminster Building, Dean Clough; 53.72851°N 1.86468°W	—	1853	A boiler house and drying house, later a warehouse and offices, it is in stone with a hipped slate roof. There are three storeys and an attic, and nine bays. In the ground floor are arched openings, in the upper floors are rectangular windows, and loading doors, and there is an external metal staircase.	II
D Mill, Dean Clough; 53.72833°N 1.86339°W		1854	A warehouse, later altered and converted into a mill, it is in stone with a modillion cornice, and a parapet with pilaster strips, and a roof partly of slate and partly of corrugated metal. There are six storeys and a basement, and sides of six and 32 bays. Many of the openings have rusticated surrounds and some have keystones. In the southern section is an entrance with a rusticated surround, a segmental-arched lintel, and a scrolled pediment containing a mirror. On the east front is a projecting toilet tower.	II
Halifax railway station 53.72070°N 1.85409°W		1855	The station was built for Lancashire and Yorkshire and the Leeds, Bradford and Halifax Junction Railways. It is in stone with a sill band, a decorative frieze, a modillion cornice, and slate roofs, and is in Palladian style. The central portion has two storeys and three bays, it is flanked by single-storey six-bay wings, the end bay projecting. In the centre is a porte-cochėre with Tuscan columns and a round-arched doorway with a fanlight. The wings contain windows and doorways with architraves and alternating triangular and segmental pediments; the doors have fanlights and the windows have aprons. All the windows are sashes.	II
Sir Francis Crossley's Almshouses, terrace and boundary walls 53.72186°N 1.87215°W		1855	A row of 27 almshouses in stone with slate roofs in Tudor Revival style. There are embattled towers in the centre and at the ends, and two octagonal turrets near the ends. Most houses have two storeys, one bay, a doorway with an arched head and a hood mould, a mullioned and transomed window in each floor, and a gable above the upper window. The south tower contains a canted bay window, and in the north tower is an oriel window. In front of the houses is a terrace and boundary walls, with steps, piers, wrought iron gates and railings.	II
Shaw Lodge Mill Chimney; 53.71447°N 1.85431°W		1855	The chimney is in gritstone, and has a square base with rusticated quoins and recessed panels. The chimney is octagonal and tapering, and is connected to the engine house by a tunnel.	II*
Shaw Lodge Mill Engine House and Boiler House; 53.71384°N 1.85391°W		1855	The engine house and boiler house are in gritstone. The engine house has rusticated quoins and a slate roof. At the south end are double-arched doors, a string course, blocked windows above, and a dentilled pediment containing a dated cartouche, and to the left is a lean-to. The boiler house has a double-pitched roof in corrugated iron. It contains various openings, and has two blocked Venetian windows.	II*
Steeple of Square Congregational Church; 53.72191°N 1.85575°W		1855–57	The rest of the church was destroyed by fire in 1971. The steeple is in stone and is in Gothic style. It consists of a tower containing clock faces and with crocketed pinnacles. It is surmounted by a slender spire with lucarnes.	II*
Screen Wall and Tower, Belle Vue Park; 53.72152°N 1.87422°W	—	c. 1856	The stone screen wall at the west end of the park has buttresses and an embattled parapet. It includes a square stone tower, also embattled, with a turret at the south containing a mullioned and transomed window.	II
Northern Bridge, People's Park; 53.72072°N 1.87164°W		c. 1856	The bridge is in cast iron and consists of a single shallow segmental arch. There is decoration in the spandrels and the balustrade, and the abutments are in stone.	II*
Southern Bridge, People's Park; 53.72017°N 1.87135°W		c. 1856	The bridge is in cast iron and consists of a single shallow segmental arch. There is decoration in the spandrels and the balustrade. The abutments are in stone and are surmounted by marble urns.	II*
Fountain and basin, People's Park; 53.72024°N 1.87243°W		c. 1856	The statue by Joseph Durham was moved to its present site in the centre of the park in 1912. It stands in the middle of a large circular basin, it is in white marble, and depicts the standing figure of Venus.	II*
Pavilion, walls and fountain pools, People's Park; 53.72018°N 1.87378°W		c. 1856	The building is in stone, it has one storey, and is in Italianate style. On the front are three arched openings with pilasters and decorative keystones, and there are similar arches on the sides. Above them is an entablature and a balustrade. Inside, at the rear, is an apse with a semi-dome containing a white marble statue by Joseph Durham depicting Francis Crossley seated. On each side are recessed screen walls, each with an arcaded loggia of four arches containing mask and shell fountains, and in front is a square pool.	II*
Piers at northeast entrance, People's Park; 53.72110°N 1.87132°W	—	c. 1856	The ornamental piers at the northeast entrance to the park have a square plan, and carry ball finials.	II
Piers at south entrance, People's Park; 53.71865°N 1.87264°W	—	c. 1856	The ornamental piers at the south entrance to the park have a square plan, and carry ball finials.	II
Piers at southeast entrance, People's Park; 53.71977°N 1.87083°W	—	1856	The ornamental piers at the southeast entrance to the park have a square plan, and carry ball finials.	II
North platform with urn, People's Park; 53.72104°N 1.87373°W	—	c. 1856	At the north end of the platform of the terrace are stone retaining walls with a parapet, a balustrade, and a flight of steps to the east. On the platform is a copy of the Borghese Vase by Francesco Bienaimė in white marble on a stone pedestal.	II*
South platform with urn, People's Park; 53.71932°N 1.87350°W		c. 1856	At the south end of the platform of the terrace are stone retaining walls with a parapet, a balustrade, and three flights of steps. On the platform is a copy of the Medici Vase by Francesco Bienaimė in white marble on a stone pedestal.	II*
Eight statues on terrace, People's Park; 53.72069°N 1.87359°W		c. 1856	The eight statues are by Francesco Bienaimė and stand along the terrace of the park. They are in white marble on stone pedestals, approximately life-size, and each depicts a standing figure in antique style.	II*
Steps to centre of terrace, People's Park; 53.72020°N 1.87323°W		c. 1856	The steps are in stone and lead from the centre of the park towards the pavilion.	II*
Six urns on pedestals, People's Park; 53.72054°N 1.87357°W		c. 1856	The six urns are along the terrace of the park. Each is in the shape of tazza, and stands on a pedestal, all in cast iron.	II*
Belle Vue; 53.72184°N 1.87324°W		1856–57	The house was built for Francis Crossley incorporating an earlier house, and has later been used for other purposes. It is in stone with a slate Mansard roof, two storeys and attics, and a symmetrical front of nine bays. In the ground floor are rusticated strip pilasters, and the upper floor has Ionic pilasters. The middle three bays project slightly under a pediment, with a round-headed window flanked by oval windows in the ground floor, and a balustraded balcony above. In the roofs are oval dormers with voluted surrounds, and on the east front is a Doric porte cochère with a segmental pediment. At the rear are five bays, first floor balconies with wrought iron railings, and segmental pediments at the ends, and beyond is a conservatory with iron-framed arcading and apsidal ends.	II*
All Souls' Church; 53.73047°N 1.86283°W		1856–59	The church, now redundant, was designed by George Gilbert Scott, and is in Decorated style. It is built in stone with slate roofs, and has a cruciform plan, consisting of a nave with a clerestory, north and south aisles, a south porch, north and south transepts, a chancel with chapels to the north and south and a vestry to the northeast, and a northeast steeple. The steeple has a tower with four stages, a parapet with crocketed pinnacles and an octagonal spire with three tiers of lucarnes.	I
Corona Chimney, Dean Clough; 53.72966°N 1.86791°W		1857	The chimney at the west end of the site is in stone and lined in brick. It is octagonal on a square chamfered base and rises to a height of 297 feet (91 m). At the top is a string course and a moulded cornice surmounted by pointed cast iron plates forming a corona.	II
E Mill, Dean Clough; 53.72825°N 1.86412°W		1857	The former spinning mill is in stone with a modillion cornice, and a parapet with pilaster strips. There are eight storeys and basement, and sides of four and 24 bays, with a single-storey six-bay extension on the east side. In the centre of the east side is a toilet tower with round-arched windows and surmounted by a water tank. The openings include entrances, loading doors and small-paned windows.	II
All Saints Church, Skircoat Green; 53.70039°N 1.86058°W		1857–58	The church, which is in free Decorated style, was extended in 1874 by W. Swinden Barber. It is built in sandstone with freestone dressings and has a slate roof. The church consists of a nave with a clerestory, north and south aisles, a north porch, a north transept, a chancel with north and east vestries, and a south steeple. The steeple has a four-stage tower with diagonal buttresses, and a northeast stair turret. The top stage is octagonal, and above it is a spire with lucarnes.	II
Crossley and Porter School; 53.71151°N 1.87776°W		1857–64	The school is in stone with slate roofs, and is in Northern Renaissance style. On the west front, the central block has two storeys and attics, and seven bays, the middle three bays projecting and containing a bow window, and flanking pavilions with three storeys and attics, three bays, and Mansard roofs with cresting. On the north front, above the main entrance, is a tower with clock faces, a cupola, and a weathervane. The windows are mullioned and transomed, and other features include gables with finials, and dormers.	II
F Mill and Annex, Dean Clough; 53.72930°N 1.86679°W		1858	The former mill is in gritstone with a modillion cornice, and a parapet with pilaster strips, and the roof has been replaced in metal. There are six storeys and a central toilet tower rising higher; the tower is flanked by 18 bays on each side. The annex consists of a block with six storeys and nine bays, a block with five storeys and seven bays, and a single-storey extension with five bays. There are various openings, some of which have been altered and others have been blocked.	II
Sundial (north), People's Park; 53.72064°N 1.87247°W		1858	The sundial to the north of the fountain consists of an upright stone. In the lower part is an inscription dated 1873.	II
White Swan Hotel; 53.72380°N 1.86079°W		1858	The hotel is in stone and in Classical style. There are four storeys and a basement, and seven bays. The central round-arched doorway has engaged Doric columns, a decorative frieze, and carved swans in the spandrels. Above the ground floor and at the top are cornices on brackets. The windows are sashes with architraves; in the ground floor they have cornices on consoles, in the first floor they have segmental pediments, and in the second floor they have open pediments with carvings.	II*
Former Public Baths; 53.71957°N 1.87080°W	—	1858–59	The public baths, later used for other purposes, are in stone with Doric pilasters and slate roofs, and in Classical style. The building consists of two-storey block with three bays, a short single-storey right wing with a curved end, an angled single-storey left wing with seven bays, and a return of four bays. The windows are sashes with moulded surrounds; in the ground floor of the main block they have round heads and the other windows have flat heads. In the right bay of the left wing is a round-headed doorway with a fanlight, flanked by Ionic columns. Behind is a two-storey pool block with curved end bays.	II
3–12 Park Road; 53.72044°N 1.87076°W		1858–65	Five, originally six, pairs of semidetached houses in stone, with eaves cornices and hipped slate roofs with urn finials. Each house has four bays, an arched doorway with Doric pilasters, cornices over the upper floor windows, and a two-storey bay window in the outer bay. Nos 5–6 and 7–8 have three storeys with a balustrade and a pediment over the outer bays, and the other houses have two storeys.	II
All Souls Vicarage; 53.73101°N 1.86243°W	—	1859	The vicarage, designed by George Gilbert Scott in Gothic style and later used as offices, is in stone with a slate roof. There are two storeys and attics, and three bays, the right two bays projecting and gabled. The doorway has a fanlight, an arched head and sidelights, above which is a hood mould. To the right is a canted bay window, and above all these is a frieze. The other windows are sashes, there is a circular window in the left gable, and a gabled dormer in the left bay. In the left return is a two-storey canted bay window, and at the rear is a wing with a hipped roof.	II
Drinking fountain, People's Park; 53.72029°N 1.87140°W		1859	The drinking fountain is in stone and has a square plan. On each face is a niche containing a decorative urn, above each niche is an arched cornice, and the fountain is surmounted by a ball finial.	II
Town Hall; 53.72437°N 1.86075°W		1859–63	The town hall was designed by Charles Barry, and completed by E. M. Barry. It is built in stone, and has a lead-covered Mansard roof, and a rectangular plan. There are two storeys and a part-basement, with the angles expressed as pavilions, and a steeple at the southwest corner. Along the sides are arcades of round-headed windows with attached columns between, Doric on the ground floor and Ionic in the upper floor, with plinths and entablatures. At the top is a parapet, partly balustraded, with pinnacles, and on the corners are domed cupolae. The steeple has a three-stage tower with clock faces, columns, statues, and a spire 80 feet (24 m) high with three tiers of dormers, and a modillion balcony, an iron balustrade, and a weathervane. At the base of the tower is a highly decorated balustraded portico with statues, the coat of arms of Halifax and ball finials.	II*
1–21 Balmoral Place, walls and railings 53.71930°N 1.86496°W	—	1860	A row of eleven stone houses on a plinth, with bands and slate roofs. Near the centre is a pavilion with three storeys, attics and a pediment. It contains a pair of porches with Doric columns, and doorways with moulded surrounds and fanlights. The flanking houses have two storeys, and contain doorways with rusticated Doric pilasters, and canted bay windows. The end houses also form pavilions with pediments and bay windows, and the other windows in the row are sashes. In front of the houses is a low wall with chamfered coping, and No. 1 has retained its ornate iron railings.	II
37–41 Church Street and 86 and 88 Horton Street; 53.72093°N 1.85577°W		1861	A former warehouse and factory on a corner site, later used for other purposes, it is in stone with rusticated pilasters, and a bracketed cornice. There are four storeys and a basement, and a trapezoidal plan. Along Church Street are 17 bays, and along Horton Street are twelve bays, with a single bay on the corner between them. On Church Street are two carriage entrance, the doorways have segmental heads, fanlights and keystones, and some have decoration in the spandrels. The windows in the ground floor have segmental heads and keystones, in the middle tow floor they have flat heads, and those in the top floor have round heads. In the corner bay is a decorative balcony.	II
Stafford Hall; 53.70804°N 1.85653°W	—	1861	A stone house on a plinth with quoins, a floor band, and a slate roof with coped gables and kneelers, it is in Gothic Revival style. There are two storeys and an attic, and the windows are chamfered with mullions and pointed heads, and contain sashes. The south front has three bays, the outer bays projecting and gabled. In the centre is a doorway, which is flanked by canted bay windows with trefoil panelled parapets, and above is a dormer. On the west front is a projecting gabled wing, and bay windows, one with an embattled parapet. The east front has a projecting gabled wing, and contains a stair window with a pointed arch.	II
Coach house and stable, Stafford Hall; 53.70831°N 1.85633°W	—	1861	The coach house and stable are in stone with a half-hipped slate roof. There is one storey and an attic, and the building contains two doorways with pointed arches, a sash window, an arched opening containing three pigeon holes, and a blocked carriage arch.	II
St Stephen's Church, Copley; 53.69730°N 1.87316°W		1861–65	The church, designed by W. H. Crossland, is in Decorated style. It is built in stone with a slate roof, and consists of a nave with a clerestory, north and south aisles, a south porch, a transeptal chapel, and a chancel with a five-sided apse and a south vestry. At the junction of the nave and the chancel is a bellcote. On the church is much grotesque carving.	II*
Joseph Crossley's Almshouses, walls, bridges, piers and steps 53.71778°N 1.87300°W		1863–70	The almshouses consist of blocks of two-storey stone buildings with slate roofs in Gothic style arranged on three sides of a garden courtyard. In the centre is an embattled tower with a taller stair turret, and in the upper storey to the west of the south block is a chapel. Features include other turrets, gables with finials, cresting on roofs, and bridges to the upper storeys, and the windows include oriel windows and bay windows. In the grounds are terrace walls, steps, and piers.	II
Wall, railings gates and piers, Joseph Crossley's Almshouses; 53.71763°N 1.87175°W		c. 1863	On the north and east of the grounds of the almshouses are stone walls with shaped coping and decorative iron railing. At the entrance on Arden Road is a pair of iron gates and stone gate piers, the latter surmounted by heraldic beasts. At the Swire's Road entrance are plainer gate piers, and gates of timber and iron.	II
31 Square Road; 53.72188°N 1.85498°W		1864	A pair of former wool warehouses, later used for other purposes, the building is in buff sandstone and has a slate roof and a triangular plan. There are two storeys, a basement and an attic, and sides of six and eight bays. In the main front is a round-arched doorway with Corinthian columns, moulded jambs, a fanlight, foliage in the spandrels, a keystone and a dentilled cornice on consoles. The windows on this front have segmental arches and lintels with keystones. The windows on the north front are plainer with flat heads, and on this front steps with splayed wing walls lead up to a doorway, above which are loading bays and a hoist in a gable.	II
Statue of Prince Consort; 53.71469°N 1.86065°W		1864	The statue, which stands in a small park at a road junction, is by Thomas Thornycroft. It is in bronze on a granite pedestal, and depicts Albert, Prince Consort, husband of Queen Victoria, sitting on a horse.	II
Shaw Lodge Mill Office Building; 53.71454°N 1.85551°W		1865	The building is in stone with a string course, dentilled eaves, and a hipped slate roof. There are two storeys and a basement, a symmetrical front of five bays, and returns of three bays. Steps lead up to the central doorway that has an architrave, pilasters, a fanlight, and a cornice on consoles. The windows are sashes with architraves; in the ground floor they have segmental heads and hood moulds, and in the upper floor they have flat heads. At the rear is a Venetian stair window, and in front of the forecourt are low wrought iron railings.	II*
10–16 Chester Road, Akroydon; 53.73338°N 1.86643°W	—	Mid to late 19th century	A row of four stone houses with slate roofs in Gothic style. They have two storeys, basements and attics, and each house has one bay, the outer bays gabled. The doorways have fanlights with shaped lintels, and the windows are sashes. The middle two houses have two-storey canted bay windows extending to the basements, and gabled dormers with quatrefoils.	II
18–24 Chester Road, Akroydon; 53.73329°N 1.86683°W	—	Mid to late 19th century	A row of four stone houses with slate roofs in Gothic style. They have two storeys, basements and attics, and each house has one bay, the outer bays gabled. Steps lead up to the doorways that have fanlights with shaped lintels, and the windows are sashes. The middle two houses have two-storey canted bay windows extending to the basements, and gabled dormers.	II
26–30 Chester Road, Akroydon; 53.73319°N 1.86723°W	—	Mid to late 19th century	A row of three stone houses with slate roofs in Gothic style. They have two storeys, basements and attics, and each house has one bay, the middle house gabled. Steps lead up to the doorways that have fanlights with shaped lintels, and the windows are sashes. The outer two houses have two-storey canted bay windows extending to the basements, and gabled dormers.	II
1 and 3 Crossley Street; 53.72411°N 1.86015°W	—	Mid to late 19th century	A pair of stone shops with an eaves cornice and a slate roof. There are three storeys and five bays. In the ground floor are modern shop fronts with pilasters. The upper floors contain windows with cornices on consoles, the windows in the centre bay are tripartite, and the centre window in the middle floor has a decorative segmental pediment.	II
17 and 19 Crossley Street; 53.72386°N 1.86128°W	—	Mid to late 19th century	A pair of shops in simple Classical style, in stone, with a blocking course, bracketed eaves, and a slate roof. There are three storeys and each shop has two bays. In the ground floor are shop fronts with pilasters and an entablature, and the upper floors contain windows with architraves, those in the middle floor with cornices.	II
21 Crossley Street and 10 Waterhouse Street; 53.72381°N 1.86146°W	—	Mid to late 19th century	A shop on a corner site in Classical style. It is in stone with quoins, storey bands, a blocking course and a cornice, and a slate roof. There are three storeys, four bays on Crossley Street, five on Waterhouse Street, and a curved bay on the corner which contains the entrance. In the ground floor are shop fronts, and in the upper floors are sash windows, those in the middle floor with cornices.	II
2 Crown Street; 53.72344°N 1.86056°W	—	Mid to late 19th century	A shop on a corner site in Classical style, it is in stone with pilasters and modillion cornices, and at the top is an entablature surmounted by urns. There are five storeys, sides of two bays, and a curved bay on the corner. In the ground floor is a shop front, the windows in the first floor have triangular or segmental pediments, and those in the second floor have cornices.	II
43 Crown Street; 53.72329°N 1.86240°W	—	Mid to late 19th century	A stone shop in Gothic style, with decorative pilasters, friezes, cornice and parapet, and a slate roof. There are three storeys and an attic, and one bay. In the ground floor is a modern shop front, and the middle floor contains three windows flanked by colonnettes in an arched recess with quatrefoils in the tympana. In the top floor are three windows with basket arches, mullions and transoms, and above is a gabled dormer.	II
45 and 47 Crown Street; 53.72328°N 1.86252°W	—	Mid to late 19th century	A pair of stone shops in Gothic style, with pilasters, a frieze, a bracketed cornice, a panelled parapet, and a slate roof. There are three storeys and an attic, and each shop has one bay. In the ground floor are modern shop fronts flanked by decorative columns, the upper floors contain windows with segmental heads, and in the attic are gabled dormers.	II
49 and 51 Crown Street; 53.72328°N 1.86267°W	—	Mid to late 19th century	A pair of stone shops with an arcaded parapet and a slate roof. There are three storeys and an attic, and each shop has one bay. In the ground floor are modern shop fronts flanked by piers and with entablatures. In the middle floor are three windows with flat heads, the top floor contains three windows with segmental heads, the middle window with a gablet, and all the windows are divided by pilasters. At the top are gabled dormers with quatrefoils.	II
53 and 55 Crown Street and 10 Central Street; 53.72329°N 1.86289°W	—	Mid to late 19th century	Offices in stone on a corner site with cornices, a frieze, and a panelled parapet. There are three storeys and attics, two bays on each front, and one bay in the canted corner. In the ground floor are modern shop fronts with piers, partly rusticated, and an entablature. In the middle floor the windows are round-headed and in the upper floor they have flat heads; they are in groups of three in the side bays and single in the corner bay. At the top are round-headed dormers.	II
17–23 Northgate; 53.72413°N 1.85994°W	—	Mid to late 19th century	A shop on a corner site in stone, with a bracketed cornice and a slate roof. It is in Classical style, and has three storeys, eight bays on Northgate, four on Crossley Street, and a rounded bay on the corner. In the ground floor are shop fronts with pilasters and a cornice. The windows in the upper floors are sashes, those in the middle floor with round heads and decoration in the tympana, and in the top floor they have flat heads and architraves.	II
25–33 Northgate and 2 Crossley Street; 53.72438°N 1.85996°W	—	Mid to late 19th century	A shop on a corner site in stone, with a bracketed cornice and a slate roof. It is in Classical style, and has three storeys, eight bays on Northgate, four on Crossley Street, and a rounded bay on the corner. In the ground floor are shop fronts with rusticated pilasters, a doorway in the corner bay, and a cornice. The windows in the upper floors are sashes, those in the middle floor with round heads and decoration in the tympana, and in the top floor they have flat heads and architraves.	II
1 Princess Street and White Swan Hotel extension 53.72355°N 1.86054°W	—	Mid to late 19th century	The building is in stone with a modillion cornice and a slate roof, and is in Classical style. There are four storeys and six bays. In the ground floor is a modern shop front with cast iron columns, and a vehicle entry. The windows are sashes with architraves; in the first floor they have pediments on consoles, in the second floor they have cornices, and in the top floor sills on consoles.	II
1–11 Ripon Terrace, Akroydon; 53.73317°N 1.86762°W		Mid to late 19th century	A terrace of six stone houses with quoins and slate roofs in Gothic style. Each house has two storeys and one gabled bay. The openings have quoined surrounds and hood moulds, the doorways are arched with fanlights, and the windows of No. 9 have retained the mullions.	II
13–27 Ripon Terrace, Akroydon; 53.73353°N 1.86785°W	—	Mid to late 19th century	A terrace of eight stone houses with quoins and slate roofs in Gothic style. The outer houses have one wide bay, two storeys and an attic, and are gabled. The inner houses have two storeys, and two narrow bays, with one bay gabled. The doorways have quoined surrounds, arched heads and fanlights. The windows have three arched lights, in the upper floor the middle light is taller, and there are small single-light windows. Two of the houses have shallow rectangular bay windows, and all the openings have hood moulds.	II
29–43 Ripon Terrace, Akroydon; 53.73402°N 1.86813°W	—	Mid to late 19th century	A terrace of eight stone houses with quoins and slate roofs in Gothic style. There are two storeys and each house has one bay. The openings have quoined surrounds and the doorways are arched with fanlights. Each house has a continuous hood mould over the doorway and the window to the left. Some of the windows have retained their mullions, and there are four gablets containing trefoils.	II
4–10 Silver Street; 53.72312°N 1.86230°W	—	Mid to late 19th century	A row of three shops in Gothic style. They are in stone with a slate roof, and have three storeys and attics. In the ground floor are shop fronts divided by cast iron columns. Between the top floors is a decorative frieze, the windows have segmental or pointed heads with pilasters between them, and at the top are gabled dormers, one with a ball finial.	II
Former Barclays Bank; 53.72306°N 1.86261°W		Mid to late 19th century	Originally a bank, later a public house on a corner site, it is in stone with a rusticated ground floor, and a slate roof. There are three storeys and an attic, with bays along Central and Silver Streets, and a bay on the canted corner. The doorway in the canted bay has an architrave, and above it is a segmental pediment containing a coat of arms. The windows in the ground floor have segmental arches with keystones, and in the middle floor are cast iron columns between the windows and decorative stonework above. An ornamental parapet and gabled dormers is above the top floor windows.	II
Gateway and lodge, Burial Ground; 53.73302°N 1.86491°W	—	Mid to late 19th century	The structures are in stone. The gateway consists of a pointed arch with a gable, and a smaller arch for pedestrians to the south, with cross finials and iron gates. To the right is a lodge that has two storeys and an L-shaped plan. It has a slate roof with coped gables, and the windows are sashes. Enclosing the front area are cast iron railings.	II
Marlborough Hall; 53.72374°N 1.86106°W	—	Mid to late 19th century	A stone building in Classical style, with two storeys and five bays. In the ground floor rusticated piers carry an entablature, and between the piers are shop windows and a central doorway. The upper floor contains five Corinthian columns flanked by two Corinthian pilasters and a moulded entablature. The windows are round-headed with keystones and decoration in the tympana. Below the windows is a balustrade and a projecting balcony also with a balustrade, and above them are projecting bracketed eaves.	II*
North Bridge and drinking fountain 53.72726°N 1.85967°W		Mid to late 19th century	The bridge consists of two cast iron spans, with the central pier and abutments in stone, the latter rising to form embattled turrets. In the spandrels and balustrade is Gothic tracery. On the southwest turret is a drinking fountain dated 1871.	II
Offices of Borough Engineer (rear premises); 53.72445°N 1.86031°W	—	Mid to late 19th century	The building is in stone with a bracketed cornice and a slate roof, and is in Classical style. There are three storeys and three bays. The ground floor has channelled rustication, and contains a doorway with a cornice on consoles, and to the right is a wide opening. The windows are sashes with hood moulds.	II
Princess Buildings; 53.72404°N 1.86046°W	—	Mid to late 19th century	The stone building is on a corner site, and is in Classical style. There are three storeys on a plinth, and sides of six and seven bays. In the ground floor are round-headed openings separated by rusticated and vermiculated piers. The windows have aprons, and the doorway has a keystone carved with a head. The windows in the middle floor have flat heads, they are flanked by engaged Corinthian columns, and have segmental pediments and balconies. In Princess Street two of the windows are oriels. The windows in the top floor have segmental heads and architraves, and two have balconies. At the top of the building is a bracketed cornice, a balustrade, a pediment on Princess Street, and on the corner are two small decorative arches.	II
Façade of Former Syon Sunday School; 53.72522°N 1.85785°W		1866	The façade has been incorporated into the east side of the bus station. It is in stone with a modillion cornice and an entablature. There is a single storey and three bays. The central bay projects and contains three arches with keystones flanked by Doric pilasters, the middle arch blocked. Above is an inscription and a triangular pediment. The outer bays each contains a round-arched window flanked by round-arched niches.	II
G and K Mills and associated range, Dean Clough; 53.72754°N 1.86377°W		1867	Additions and extensions were made in later years. G Mill was a spinning mill, K Mill a warehouse, and the associated range included stores, stables and workshops; they are all in stone with slate roofs. G Mill has a modillion cornice and a parapet, nine storeys reducing to six, sides of 19 and eight bays, a single-storey extension with a pyramidal roof, and external lift and toilet towers. K Mill is dated 1891, and has a hipped roof, a modillion cornice and a small pediment, five storeys reducing to one, and eight bays. The associated range has a hipped roof, two storeys and seven bays, with extensions of one and two storeys.	II
Park Congregational Church; 53.72151°N 1.87488°W		1867–69	The former church, later used for other purposes, is in stone with a slate roof, and is in Gothic style. It consists of a nave, aisles with lateral gables, a chancel with an apse, and a southwest steeple. The steeple has a tower with buttresses, it rises to octagonal at the bell stage, and is surmounted by a small spire.	II
Freemasons' Hall and railings 53.71963°N 1.86194°W	—	1868–70	The hall is in stone and has two storeys and a basement, and seven bays, the bays at the right under a pediment. In the centre is a two-bay portico with symbols of Freemasonry, and a dentiled cornice. The openings in the ground floor have segmental heads, and in the upper floor they have round-arched heads with architraves and keystones. The basement area is enclosed with cast iron railings, which also incorporate Freemasonry symbols. The whole was surrounded by a glass extension in 1987–90.	II
TA Drill Hall; 53.71968°N 1.85818°W		1868–70	The hall, which has been converted into flats, is in stone and has a slate roof with coped gables and kneelers. The entrance front has flanking buttresses and a Gothic-arched corbel table. In the centre is a gabled porch and a doorway with a pointed arch and a decorated tympanum. Above it is a large circular window with octofoil tracery. On the front are two tiers of lancet windows, a sash window to the left, and a doorway with a fanlight to the right. The right return has one storey, nine bays, and a cross-wing at the end. In the centre is a projecting porch and a doorway with a pointed head, the bays are divided by buttresses, and contain triple lancet windows. The cross wing has two storeys and an attic, and a circular window in the apex.	II
Drinking fountain 53.71231°N 1.87086°W		1869	The drinking fountain is in the northeast corner of Savile Park. It is in stone and has a square plan, with a niche containing a bowl on each side. At the corners are columns of polished granite, and the top is domed.	II
7 and 9 Crossley Street; 53.72396°N 1.86084°W	—	1871–73	A block of offices on a corner site in Gothic style, it is in stone on a plinth, with a rusticated ground floor, rusticated quoins, a bracketed cornice at the top, and a balustrade. There are four storeys and attics, five bays on Crossley Street, four on Princess Street, and a curving bay on the corner. In the ground floor is the entrance to a passageway, and the other openings are round-headed with keystones. The main doorway is in the corner bay, it is flanked by columns, and above is a round arch with a motto in the tympanum and decorated spandrels. The windows in the first floor have segmental pediments, in the second floor they have cornices, and at the top are dormers with shaped gables.	II
Bermerside House; 53.70281°N 1.86709°W		1872	A small country house, it is in stone on a plinth, with bands, moulded eaves, a pierced parapet, and a slate roof with coped gables and finials. At the entrance is a projecting porch with Ionic columns and a round-headed doorway. The windows are sashes, on the south front is a two-storey bow window and elsewhere are bay windows, and a French window. Attached to the service block are a conservatory and a two-storey observatory, the latter converted into a house.	II
Former Sunday school, Carlton Terrace; 53.72051°N 1.86233°W	—	1872	The building is in sandstone with a slate roof. There are two storeys, four bays on the front, and seven bays on the sides. The doorway has an architrave, a fanlight, and a cornice, the ground floor windows are rectangular sash windows, and in the upper floor they are round-arched with keystones. Above the right three bays is a dentilled gable containing an inscribed panel.	II
Coal drops, Station Yard; 53.72233°N 1.85303°W	—	1874	The coal drops, which were built for the Ovenden and Halifax Junction Railway Company, consist of 15 wooden bunkers with stone piers built into a sloping hillside. To the north is an open shed and a wall with a parapet. Each bunker has two metal doors.	II
Queen's Road Schools; 53.72302°N 1.88240°W		1874	The former school is in stone with a slate roof. It has a single storey and consists of a long central range flanked by projecting wings. The windows are mainly paired and round-headed with keystones and pilasters. The doorway has a round-arched head with a keystone, a fanlight, and paired pilasters, and above it is a square tower with a louvered belfry and a pyramidal roof with cresting. To the left of the entrance bay are two bays with a pediment and the ends of the wings are pedimented; the tympana of the pediments contain elaborate carving.	II
Statue of Edward Akroyd; 53.73015°N 1.86282°W		1875	The statue stands in a triangular garden. It is in grey granite with steps, a plinth and a pedestal, and standing on the pedestal is a bronze statue of Edward Akroyd. On the sides of pedestal are bronze plaques with various depictions.	II
Victoria Memorial, Akroydon; 53.73394°N 1.86690°W		1875	The memorial is in the centre of The Square, Akroydon, and is in stone. It was designed by W. Swinden Barber, and is in the form of an Eleanor Cross. It has a hexagonal plan and stands on a stepped base. There are three main stages, and it is surmounted by pinnacles and a small spire. On the south face is a statue of Queen Victoria and an inscription.	II
33–37 Chester Road, Akroydon; 53.73279°N 1.86761°W	—	Late 19th century	A pair of stone houses with a slate roof. They have two storeys and attics, a central block of two bays, and outer gabled wings projecting to the north. The windows are mullioned and transomed, and there are gabled dormers.	II
4 Crossley Street; 53.72431°N 1.86023°W	—	Late 19th century	The building is on a corner side and is in Classical style. It is in stone with channelled rustication in the ground floor, a bracketed cornice, and a slate roof. There are three storeys and a basement, four bays on Crossley Street, five on Town Hall Street, and a curved bay on the corner. Steps lead up to the round-headed doorway in the corner bay that has Ionic columns, and an entablature. In the Town Hall Street face is a carriage entrance with a cornice on consoles converted into a doorway. The windows are sashes, some have cornices on consoles, some have balustrades, and one has a triangular pediment.	II
Sundial (south), People's Park; 53.71991°N 1.87238°W	—	Late 19th century (probable)	The sundial to the south of the fountain consists of a stone baluster with some carving.	II
Shaw Lodge Mill Former Combing Shed; 53.71488°N 1.85500°W	—	1876	A warehouse and a shed in gritstone, the shed has a sheet metal roof, and the roof of the warehouse in slated. The warehouse has two storeys, and three at the south, and contains 15 windows, the shed has one storey and both have vehicle entrances.	II*
Wainhouse Terrace; 53.71432°N 1.88617°W		1876	A viewing platform built behind a row of back-to-back houses. It is in stone, and has a bridge leading to a staircase turret.	II
1 and 2 Abbott's Ladies' Home; 53.70722°N 1.86103°W	—	1876–77	A pair of almshouses by W. Swinden Barber, they are in stone on a chamfered plinth, with a floor band, and a slate roof with coped gables, kneelers and finials. There are two storeys and four bays, the central bays are gabled, larger and slightly projecting. In the upper floor the windows are mullioned with hood moulds, and in the lower floor they are mullioned and transomed. The outer bays each contains a bow-headed doorway with a moulded surround, a narrow window to the outside, and a lancet window with a moulded head above.	II
3 and 4 Abbott's Ladies' Home; 53.70716°N 1.86051°W	—	1876–77	A pair of almshouses by W. Swinden Barber, they are in stone on a chamfered plinth, with a floor band, and a slate roof with coped gables, kneelers and finials. There are two storeys and four bays, the central bays are gabled, larger and slightly projecting. In the upper floor the windows are mullioned with hood moulds, and in the lower floor they are mullioned and transomed. The outer bays each contains a bow-headed doorway with a moulded surround, a narrow window to the outside, and a lancet window with a moulded head above.	II
5 and 6 Abbott's Ladies' Home; 53.70654°N 1.86065°W	—	1876–77	A pair of almshouses by W. Swinden Barber, they are in stone on a chamfered plinth, with a floor band, and a slate roof with coped gables, kneelers and finials. There are two storeys and four bays, the central bays are gabled, larger and slightly projecting. In the upper floor the windows are mullioned with hood moulds, and in the lower floor they are mullioned and transomed. The outer bays each contains a bow-headed doorway with a moulded surround, a narrow window to the outside, and a lancet window with a moulded head above.	II
7 Abbott's Ladies' Home; 53.70654°N 1.86109°W	—	1876–77	An almshouse by W. Swinden Barber, it is in stone on a chamfered plinth, with a floor band, and a slate roof with coped gables, kneelers and ball finials. There is one storey and two bays, the left bay gabled and slightly projecting. In the left bay is a mullioned window, the right bay contains a mullioned and transomed window, and between them is a bow-headed doorway with a moulded surround.	II
8 and 9 Abbott's Ladies' Home; 53.70656°N 1.86188°W	—	1876–77	A pair of almshouses by W. Swinden Barber, they are in stone on a chamfered plinth, with a floor band, and a slate roof with coped gables, kneelers and finials. There are two storeys and four bays, the central bays are gabled, larger and slightly projecting. In the upper floor the windows are mullioned with hood moulds, and in the lower floor they are mullioned and transomed. The outer bays each contains a bow-headed doorway with a moulded surround, a narrow window to the outside, and a lancet window with a moulded head above.	II
10 and 11 Abbott's Ladies' Home; 53.70672°N 1.86243°W	—	1876–77	A pair of almshouses by W. Swinden Barber, they are in stone on a chamfered plinth, with a floor band, and a slate roof with coped gables, kneelers and finials. There are two storeys and four bays, the central bays are gabled, larger and slightly projecting. In the upper floor the windows are mullioned with hood moulds, and in the lower floor they are mullioned and transomed. The outer bays each contains a bow-headed doorway with a moulded surround, a narrow window to the outside, and a lancet window with a moulded head above.	II
12 Abbott's Ladies' Home; 53.70698°N 1.86245°W	—	1876–77	An almshouse by W. Swinden Barber, it is in stone on a chamfered plinth, with a floor band, and a slate roof with coped gables, kneelers and ball finials. There is one storey and two bays, the right bay gabled and slightly projecting. In the right bay is a mullioned window, the left bay contains a mullioned and transomed window, and between them is a bow-headed doorway with a moulded surround.	II
Lodge, Abbott's Ladies' Home; 53.70729°N 1.86222°W	—	1876–77	The lodge at the entrance to the complex of almshouses was designed by W. Swinden Barber. It is in stone on a chamfered plinth, and has a floor band and a slate roof with coped gables, kneelers and ball finials. There is one storey and two bays, the left bay gabled and slightly projecting. In the left bay is a canted bay window with a hipped roof. The right bay contains a mullioned and transomed window, and between them is a bow-headed doorway with a moulded surround.	II
Walls and gates, Abbott's Ladies' Home; 53.70723°N 1.86255°W	—	1876–77	The gates at the entrance to the complex of almshouses and the flanking walls were designed by W. Swinden Barber. There are three stone gate piers with a square plan and moulded bases, and between them are iron pedestrian and vehicle gates. The walls have chamfered coping and carry ornate iron railings.	II
Former Heath Grammar School, drill shed, fives court, wall, and gateway 53.71246°N 1.86322°W		1877–79	The former grammar school is in sandstone with slate roofs and is in Elizabethan style. The main building is rectangular with a rear wing, two storeys and a basement, and a front of nine bays. In the central bay is a porch with a Tudor arched doorway, above which is a pediment and finials. The bay is gabled and contains a decorative circular window, a copy of the window in the original school, and under it is an eight-light window. The gable is coped, it has a finial, and is flanked by pinnacles with finials. The flanking bays and the outer bays are also gabled, and the bays between have pierced parapets. The windows are mullioned and transomed. To the west of the school are a former drill room containing the original circular window, and two fives courts. The boundary wall at the front of the school contains a memorial gateway flanked by piers with inscribed plaques, and between them are decorative ironwork gates and a lintel with a Latin motto.	II
Bailey Hall Mill; 53.72146°N 1.85221°W		1879	A flour mill in stone with a bracketed eaves band, and slate roofs with coped gables with kneelers. The main block has five storeys and a front of 17 bays, and to the south is a warehouse with two storeys and nine bays. To the east is a triple-gabled single-storey boiler house with an attached octagonal chimney with a moulded cap, and to the southwest is a warehouse with three storeys and six bays, and a two-storey former watchman's house.	II
Halifax High School; 53.71848°N 1.86131°W		1882	The school, which was extended in 1894, has been converted into flats. It is in stone with a slate roof. The original range has two storeys and a basement, and twelve bays, with taller entrance blocks at the ends. The 1894 addition is at 45 degrees to the south, and has three storeys and four bays, and there is an octagonal stair tower at the junction. The windows are mullioned and transomed, the bays are separated by pilasters, and alternate bays have gabled dormers containing round windows.	II
Signal Box, Halifax railway station 53.72149°N 1.85327°W		1884	The signal box, on a platform at the station, was built for the Lancashire and Yorkshire Railway. There are two storeys, the lower storey is in brick, the upper storey has weatherboarding, and the roof is slated with gables that have decorative bargeboards and spear-point finials. In the upper storey is continuous glazing on all sides, including some horizontally-sliding sash windows. In the northern gable end is a central doorway, and there are five windows in the lower storey.	II
Great Northern Shed; 53.71913°N 1.85506°W		1885	The railway engine shed was built for the Lancashire and Yorkshire and the Great Northern Railways. It is in stone with a slate roof, and has two storeys. The east and west fronts have ten bays, each bay gabled, and with pilasters between the bays. The north and south fronts have five bays with engine openings, and attached to the south front is a two-storey four-bay office wing.	II
Head Post Office; 53.72215°N 1.86130°W		1887	The post office, designed by Henry Tanner, is in sandstone on a plinth, and has string courses and a grey slate roof with red ridge tiles. There are two storeys and attics, and three gabled bays with linking bays between, the bays all flanked by tourelles. The middle bay contains a doorway with a fanlight in a pointed arch, to the left is a similar window, between them is a carved shield, and above is an inscribed band. The outer and linking bays contain similar windows in the ground floor, and in the upper floors of the outer bays are canted oriel windows, and three-light windows in the attics. The other windows in the upper floor are mullioned and transomed. On the roof is a narrow octagonal spire with a lantern and a leaded roof.	II
St Jude's Church, Savile Park; 53.71284°N 1.86993°W		1889–90	The church, designed by W. Swinden Barber, is in Gothic style. it is built in sandstone with freestone dressings and has a slate roof. The church consists of a nave with a clerestory, north and south aisles, a chancel with a south organ chamber and a north chapel, and a southwest tower. The tower has four stages, angle buttresses, a south doorway, clock faces, and an embattled parapet with pinnacles.	II
Borough Market and shopping arcade to the north 53.72236°N 1.85946°W		1891–96	A covered market in stone with slate roofs, two and three storeys, in free Renaissance style. It has a rectangular plan with ranges of shops with flats above on three sides, and a projecting shopping arcade to the north, all surrounding an open space roofed in glass and cast iron. The external features include arches and piers, turrets, tourelles, dormers, finials and pyramidal roofs. In the centre is an iron clock and lamp standard under an octagonal dome 60 feet (18 m) high.	II*
01, 02, 03, 04, 05, 08, 10, 20, 22, 35, and 38 Blocks, Royal Halifax Infirmary; 53.71344°N 1.86519°W		1892–96	The buildings from the former hospital have been converted into residential accommodation. They are in stone, with gabled and hipped slate roofs, and are in Renaissance style. The buildings form a symmetrical plan, with an administrative block, admission buildings, central hall and kitchen in the centre, flanked by wards in four rows of two blocks, linked by a corridor. Most of the windows are casements with chamfered surrounds, mullions and transoms.	II
Retaining and boundary walls, Royal Halifax Infirmary; 53.71263°N 1.86508°W	—	1892–96	The walls are in stone with chamfered coping. The retaining wall runs from the lodge to the east, increasing in height, for about 100 metres (330 ft), and has a coped balustrade with piers and ball finials. Beyond that the lower boundary wall runs for about 80 metres (260 ft); it has square coped piers and railings, and at the end is a gateway.	II
Palatine Chambers; 53.72321°N 1.85946°W	—	1894	A curved building on a corner site, with a steel frame, stone cladding, and a slate roof. There are four storeys and eight bays. In the first bay is a cart entrance and the other bays contain shop fronts and an office entrance. Between the bays are rusticated pilasters, and above the shop fronts are fascias and a decorated frieze. In the upper floors are casement windows, the bays divided by pilasters, and between the windows in the first and second floors are columns. Between the two top floors is a bracketed cornice, and at the top each bay has a central pediment with a finial.	II
The Old Arcade; 53.72315°N 1.85974°W		c. 1895	The interior of the arcade is mainly in iron, glass and some timber. The entrance pavilions are in stone with slate roofs, and have three storeys and attics. They are elaborately decorated, and features include shaped gables, dormers and turrets.	II
Bandstand, People's Park; 53.71982°N 1.87303°W		1897	The bandstand is in cast iron and has an octagonal plan. Around the platform are decorative railings, and eight thin columns with ornamental spandrels carry an ogee roof with a finial.	II
2 Silver Street; 53.72325°N 1.86204°W		1897–98	A bank on a tapered corner site, later used for other purposes, it is in stone with a slate roof, and is in Gothic style. There are three storeys and attics, four bays in Silver Street, seven in Crown Street, and three between them in Waterhouse Street. The ground floor is arcaded, the windows in the upper storeys have round heads and are in pairs or larger groups. At the top are small turrets with conical roofs, gabled dormers, and between them are pierced parapets.	II
Lloyds Bank; 53.72222°N 1.86190°W		1897–98	The bank is in sandstone on a rusticated plinth, with a moulded sill band, and a roof of slate and glass. The central entrance is flanked by paired Corinthian columns in polished red granite on plinths carved with lions' heads, carrying a pediment containing the coats of arms of Halifax. The doorway has an eared architrave in marble, and above it is an oval window flanked by carved cherubs. The outer bays have fluted Corinthian pilasters, and windows with pediments in the lower floor and festoons above. The parapet is panelled, and includes balustrades.	II
The Victoria Theatre; 53.72126°N 1.86173°W		1897–1901	The theatre, which was restored in 1962–66, is in stone with a Welsh slate roof. There are two storeys, sides of eight and five bays, and nine bays on the curved corner. Flanking the curved bays are two three-stage towers with tall Baroque lanterns, at the entrance is a slate-roofed canopy, and along the ground floor of the right return are shop fronts. Between the bays are Ionic pilasters in the ground floor and half-columns in the upper floor. Between the floors is a frieze with inscriptions, including the names of composers, and above it in the curved section are two niches with statues. Above the top floor is an entablature, an eaves cornice, and a balustrade with urn finials. Over the entrance, the roof is conical, and is surmounted by a cast iron lantern with an ogee roof and a spike finial.	II
Lodge, wall and gateway, Royal Halifax Infirmary; 53.71268°N 1.86591°W		1898	The lodge to the former hospital, later used for other purposes, is in stone and has a slate roof with coped gables. There is one storey and three bays, the outer bays gabled and containing semicircular bow windows. In the right gable is a coat of arms, and to the right of the window is a round-headed doorway. The windows are mullioned and transomed, and contain casements. On both sides of the entrance to the grounds are curving stone walls, in front of the lodge with railings and square piers, and on the right of the entrance are piers with ball finials.	II
Police Station; 53.72016°N 1.86335°W		1898–1900	The police station and court rooms are in stone with slate roofs, and are in Early Renaissance style. There are two storeys and attics, and the main front on Blackwall has eleven bays. The middle bay projects and contains a round-headed doorway with a moulded hood carrying a royal coat of arms, and above is a semicircular gable with a finial. The windows are sashes; in the ground floor they have flat heads and moulded hoods, in the upper floor they have lights with round heads, and above them is a parapet with ball finials. Two of the bays contain splayed two-storey bay windows, and these bays have recessed gables. Behind the entrance bay is a tower with pilasters and twin arched openings, and an octagonal cupola. The front on Harrison Road has 20 bays, and there are three bays on the Carlton Street front.	II
Post Office Chambers; 53.72193°N 1.86120°W		c. 1900	A block of offices with a public house in the ground floor, it is in stone with a roof of green slate, and is in free Baroque style. There are three storeys, sides of eight and six bays and a canted corner bay. In the ground floor is a modern pub front, and the upper floors are highly decorated with a corner octagonal domed turret, and square turrets with pyramidal roofs at the ends. Most windows are mullioned and transomed, and there are oriel windows, canted bay windows, oeil-de-boeuf windows, and a two-storey bow window.	II
1–9 Beverley Place, Akroydon; 53.73403°N 1.86584°W	—	Late 19th to early 20th century	A terrace of five stone houses with quoins and a slate roof. There are two storeys, and each house has two bays. The windows are sashes.	II
1–19 Salisbury Terrace, Akroydon; 53.73422°N 1.86751°W		Late 19th to early 20th century	A terrace of ten stone houses, in pairs, stepped up the hill, with slate roofs, two storeys and one bay. Each house has a doorway with an arched head and a fanlight, and the windows are sashes.	II
8–12 Horton Street; 53.72088°N 1.85897°W	—	1903	An office block and a shop in Baroque Revival style, in stone with a green slate roof. The office block has three storeys and a basement, and three bays divided by pilasters. In the right bay is wide arch with voussoirs, and a hood mould that continues over the other ground floor openings. In the left bay is a mullioned and transomed window with a similar arch, and in the middle bay is a smaller round-headed doorway. All the windows have small panes. At the top is a modillion eaves cornice and a balustrade. The shop to the right has two storeys and one gabled bay. In the ground floor is a shop front with a recessed doorway, a fascia, and a cornice, and the upper floor contains an elliptical-headed window flanked by smaller windows.	II
16–28 Horton Street; 53.72089°N 1.85863°W	—	1903	A row of shops in stone with glazed brick in the ground floor, brick at the rear, slate roofs, and three storeys. To the left of Nos. 16–22 is an archway, and to the right are shop fronts with wide basket arches. The upper floors contain two-storey shallow oriel windows, and at the top are a parapet, and round gables with ball finials. Nos. 24–28 have two semicircular-arched shop windows flanking a recessed arched doorway. Above, the outer bays contain two-storey canted bay windows flanked by pilasters over which are shaped gables and ball finials. The central bay contains narrow windows with a modillion cornice and a balustrade above.	II
Theatre Royal; 53.72126°N 1.85948°W		1904	Originally the Royal Cinema and later converted into a theatre, it is in stone, and is in Edwardian Baroque style. The front has three storeys and an attic, and seven bays. The ground floor is rusticated and contains three round-headed entrances. Above these is a giant Ionic portico with a pediment containing a circular window flanked by reclining figures. The windows in the first floor have moulded surrounds and keystones, alternating segmental and triangular pediments, and decorated aprons. The outer bays have segmental pediments containing ornate oval windows, and at the top of the building is a parapet with urn finials.	II
St Paul's Church; 53.71672°N 1.87990°W		1911–12	The church, designed by Sir Charles Nicholson in free Perpendicular style, is built in sandstone with freestone dressings and a stone slate roof. It consists of a nave with a clerestory, north and south aisles, a north porch, a chancel with a north chapel and south organ chamber and vestries, and an embraced west tower. The tower has three stages, diagonal buttresses, a south polygonal stair turret, a west doorway with a moulded surround, a four-light west window, and an embattled parapet.	II*
Arcade Royale; 53.72194°N 1.86052°W		1912	A steel-framed shopping arcade encased in white and green faience, with two storeys and a front of 16 bays. The two main entrances are flanked by Ionic columns, above is a curved window in a round-arched recess, over which is an octagonal lantern with a panelled dome. The ground floor contains shop fronts, and in the upper floor are windows of differing types; some are round-headed and some have mullions and transoms. At the top are panels, a stepped modillioned cornice, and a parapet with balustrading and ball finials.	II
Former Picture House; 53.72070°N 1.86151°W		1913	A cinema, later used for other purposes, it is in stone with faience at the entrance, and a slate roof, and is in free Baroque style. The central entrance is recessed behind a curved porch with Tuscan columns carrying an entablature with a dentilled cornice and a balustrade, behind which is a tower with a clock face and an ogee dome. The porch is flanked by canted two-storey bays with pilasters.	II
War memorial 53.72362°N 1.85407°W		1922	The war memorial was moved to its present site in Duffy's Park about 1980. It is in stone, and consists of a tapering rectangular pier, standing on three shallow steps and a chamfered plinth. It carries inscriptions relating to both World Wars, and in 1947 a plaque was added for the Second World War.	II
National Westminster Bank; 53.72354°N 1.86199°W		1927	The bank is on a corner site, and is in Portland stone with a slate roof. There are three storeys and a recessed attic, sides of six and five bays, and a curved bay on the corner. The ground floor has channelled rustication, and the windows and doorway have rounded heads and keystones. Above the doorway is decorative ironwork and stone carving. In the upper floors the windows have flat heads and architraves, in the middle floor they have cornices and balustrades. At the top of the building is a modillion cornice, a balustrade, and urns, and it is surmounted by a lead-covered dome.	II
Royal Oak Public House; 53.72058°N 1.85943°W		1929–31	The public house is in sandstone with applied timber framing and slate roofs, and is in Vernacular Revival style. There are three storeys, and an irregular plan, with sides of six and three bays. There are gabled bays with caved bargeboards on each front, a gabled porch, and windows of various types, including a two-storey canted oriel window on carved brackets. On the side is a carved board depicting the history of road transport.	II
The Three Pigeons Public House; 53.71872°N 1.85632°W		1932	The public house is in sandstone with a stone slate roof, and has two storeys and a basement, a front of two bays, and two rear ranges. The central doorway has shaped dressings and a fanlight, and is flanked by semicircular bay windows. Above the door is a recessed panel containing a pub sign, and at the top is a sculpture in white stone of three pigeons. This flanked by three-light mullioned windows, and at the top is a curved and stepped parapet.	II
Former ABC Cinema; 53.72106°N 1.86071°W		1938	The cinema, later used for other purposes, is in stone and is in Moderne style. There are two and three storeys and the plan of a triangle with rounded sides. The entrance is flanked by pilasters, and above it is an architrave containing long windows with aprons and a roof parapet. To the left is a shop, and to the right the wall curves round the corner and contains doorways and windows with metal frames.	II
The Halifax Building; 53.71991°N 1.86137°W		1968–74	Built as the head office of the Halifax Building Society, it is in York stone and brown tinted glass with brown anodised aluminium framing. There are four storeys and basements, and a parallelogram plan. The two-storey entrance is deeply recessed and carried on square stair towers. The second floor is blind and deeply chamfered, and the upper floors have glass curtain walls.	II
