= Akroydon =

Model housing in West Yorkshire, England

Coordinates: 53°44′00″N 01°52′00″W

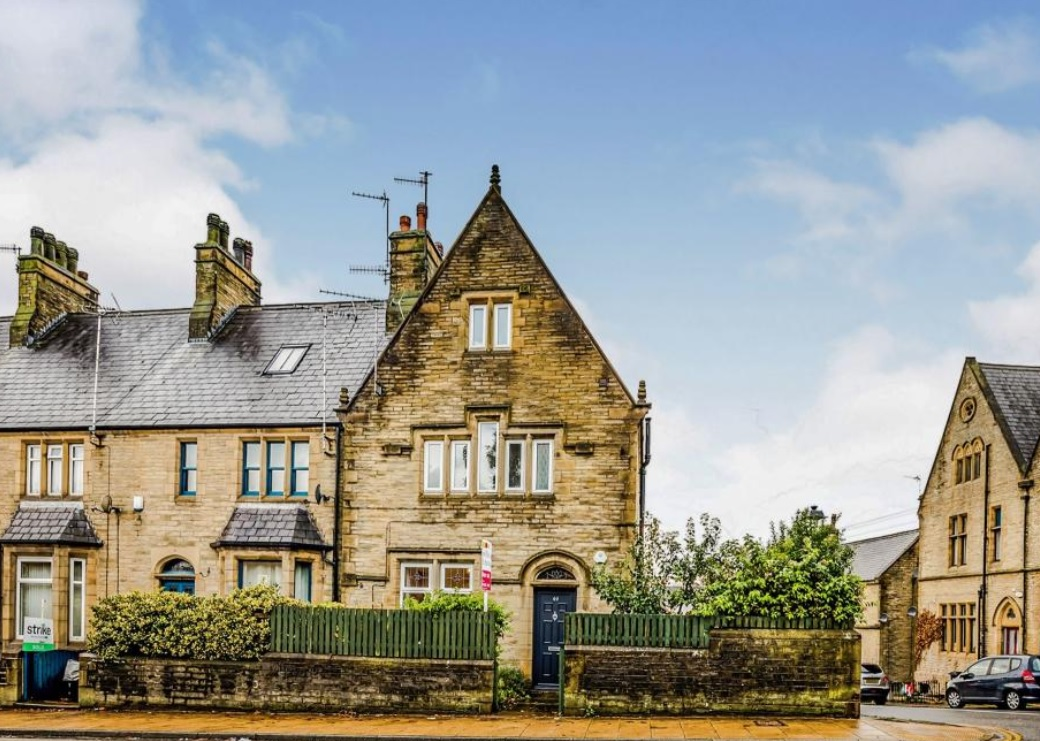
Housing in Akroydon

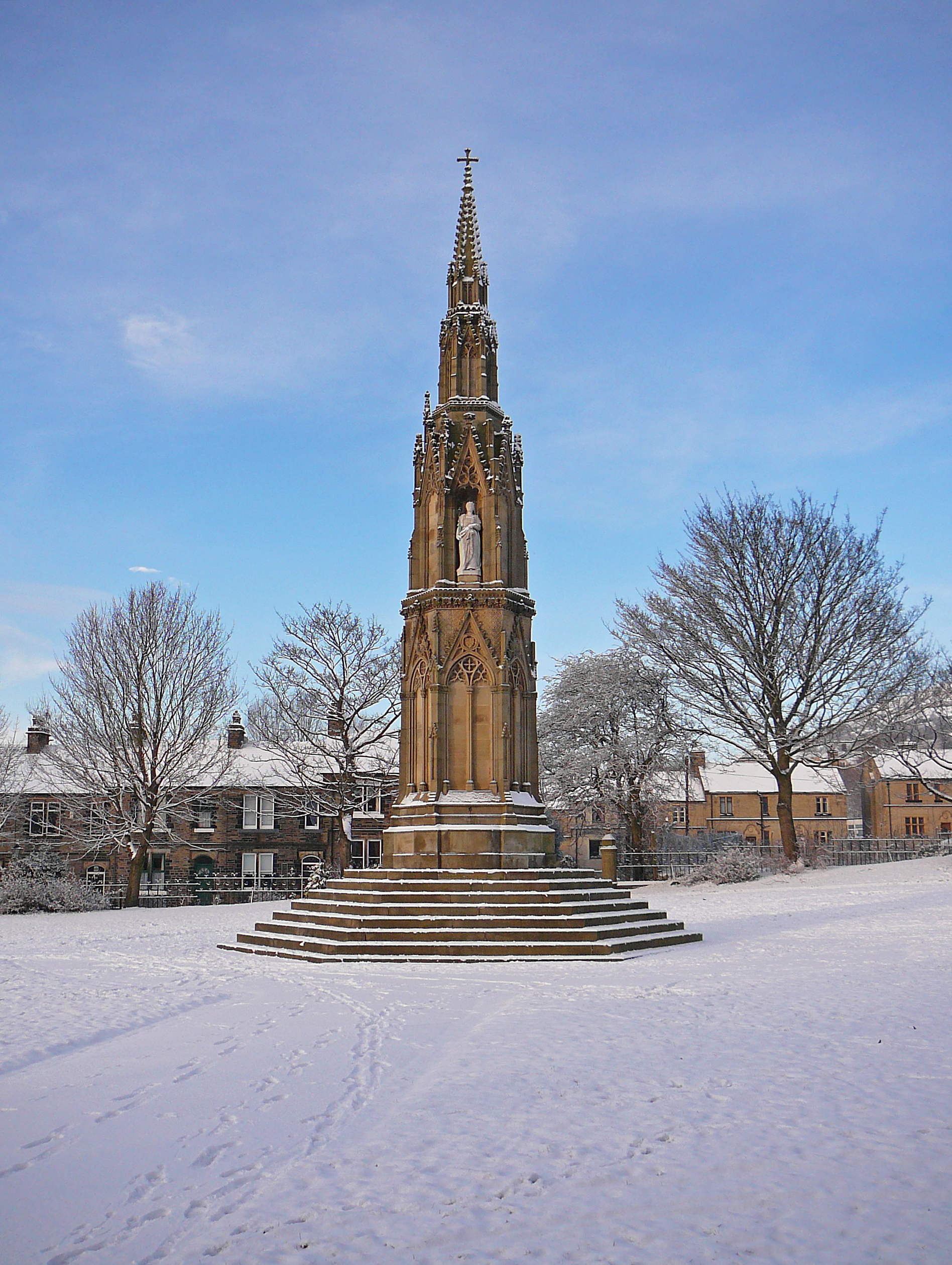
Victoria Cross, by William Swinden Barber, built in 1875 and dedicated to Queen Victoria

The Akroydon model housing scheme is a Victorian-era model village at Boothtown, Halifax, in the Metropolitan Borough of Calderdale in West Yorkshire, England. It was designed in the Gothic style by George Gilbert Scott in 1859 for the workers at the mills of Colonel Edward Akroyd, who had bought, in 1855, the 62,435 acres (25,267 ha) of land on which the houses were to be built.

As Scott's original plan to have dormer windows in the cottages was unacceptable to members of the Akroyd Town Building Association, Akroyd employed a local architect – W. H. Crossland – under the supervision of Scott, to come up with an acceptable design. The plan was for a quadrangular arrangement of 350 houses, but only 90 were actually built.

In the middle of the quadrangle, known as The Square, Akroyd had a monument called the Victoria Cross built in 1875 and dedicated to Queen Victoria. Its inscription includes a long quotation from William Wordsworth's poem The Excursion. The monument, similar in style to an Eleanor Cross, has been described as "a monument to the British constitution".

According to Walter L Creese, this "suburb on the moors" was Akroyd's attempt "to justify contemporary upheaval, to rationalize for himself and others the improvement and purpose of the factory system as it was replacing the cottage industries".

It was to be a model village not only in the architectural sense but also in a social sense, as the houses were built in various sizes for people from all economic classes, who were offered low cost mortgages to buy them. (Note: The village was built with the support of the Halifax Permanent Building Society which later became the Halifax Building Society. "A Halifax church with a story to tell". BBC News. 27 January 2010.) The village was to be managed by a committee of residents. There was a working men’s college for self-improvement.

== Notable people ==
Eric Portman, stage and film actor, was born at 71 Chester Road, Akroydon, in 1901.

John Reginald Halliday Christie (the serial killer of 10, Rillington Place, London) was born in Northowram in 1899 and lived with his parents at Chester Road, Akroydon.

== See also ==
- Listed buildings in Halifax, West Yorkshire
- All Souls' Church, Halifax
- Bankfield Museum
- Copley, West Yorkshire
- Stewartby
- Woodlands
