= Copley railway station =

Disused railway station in West Yorkshire, England

Copley
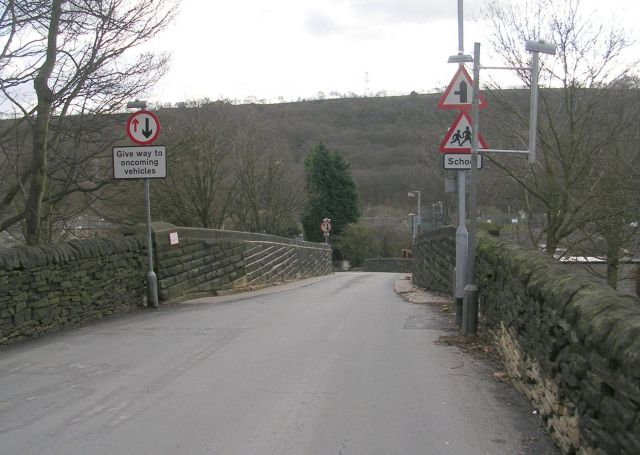
- Looking south along Copley Lane, the bridge over the Sowerby Bridge to Halifax railway line, Copley railway station was east of this bridge.

General information
- Location: Copley, Calderdale; England
- Coordinates: 53.700754°N 1.868943°W
- Grid reference: SE087227
- Platforms: 2

Other information
- Status: Disused

History
- Original company: Lancashire & Yorkshire Railway
- Post-grouping: London Midland & Scottish Railway

Key dates
- 1856: Station opened
- 20 July 1931: Station closed
Location

Copley railway station was a railway station that served the village of Copley in West Yorkshire, England.

Preceding station	Disused railways	Following station
Sowerby Bridge	Lancashire & Yorkshire Railway	Halifax
