= People's Park, Halifax =

Park in Halifax, West Yorkshire, England

Coordinates: 53.7193°N 1.8735°W

Halifax Park and Improvement Act 1858
- Act of Parliament
- Parliament of the United Kingdom
- Long title: An Act for confirming the Gift by Francis Crossley Esquire to the Borough of Halifax of a Park for the Benefit of the Inhabitants of the Borough, and for authorizing the Mayor, Aldermen, and Burgesses of the Borough to maintain and regulate the Park, and to provide, maintain, and regulate Public Baths in the Park, and for making a Cemetery, and for making further Provision with respect to the Waterworks and the Gasworks, and the Improvement of the Borough; and for other Purposes.
- Citation: 21 & 22 Vict. c. xci

Dates
- Royal assent: 12 July 1858

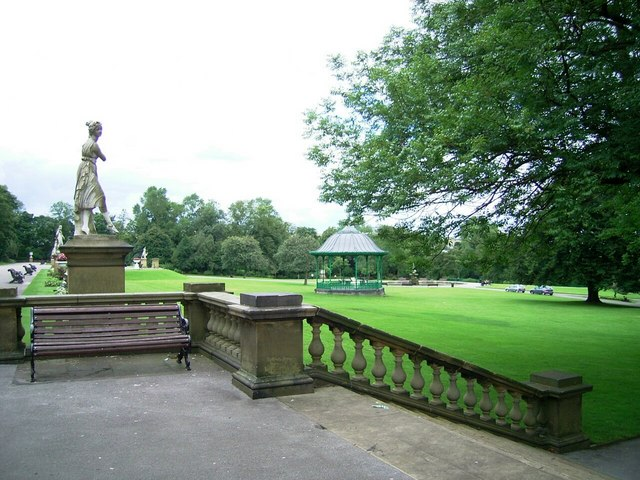
Terrace, statue of "Diana the huntress" and bandstand in the People's Park

The People's Park is a park in Halifax, West Yorkshire, England. It was given to the people of Halifax in 1857 by local carpet manufacturer Sir Francis Crossley.

The park was originally designed by Joseph Paxton, but suffering neglect in the late 20th century until a major restoration project which started in 1995. It is listed as Grade II* in the Register of Historic Parks and Gardens of special historic interest in England, and the Crossley Pavilion, a building in the park, is a Grade II* listed building.

Crossley had reportedly been impressed by the beauty of the scenery of New England on a visit and returned to Halifax eager "to arrange art and nature so that they shall be within the walk of every working man in Halifax; that he shall go to take his stroll there after he has done his hard day's toil, and be able to get home without being tired".

== See also ==
- Listed buildings in Halifax, West Yorkshire
