= Prescott Street drill hall, Halifax =

Building in Halifax, West Yorkshire, England

Prescott Street drill hall
- Halifax
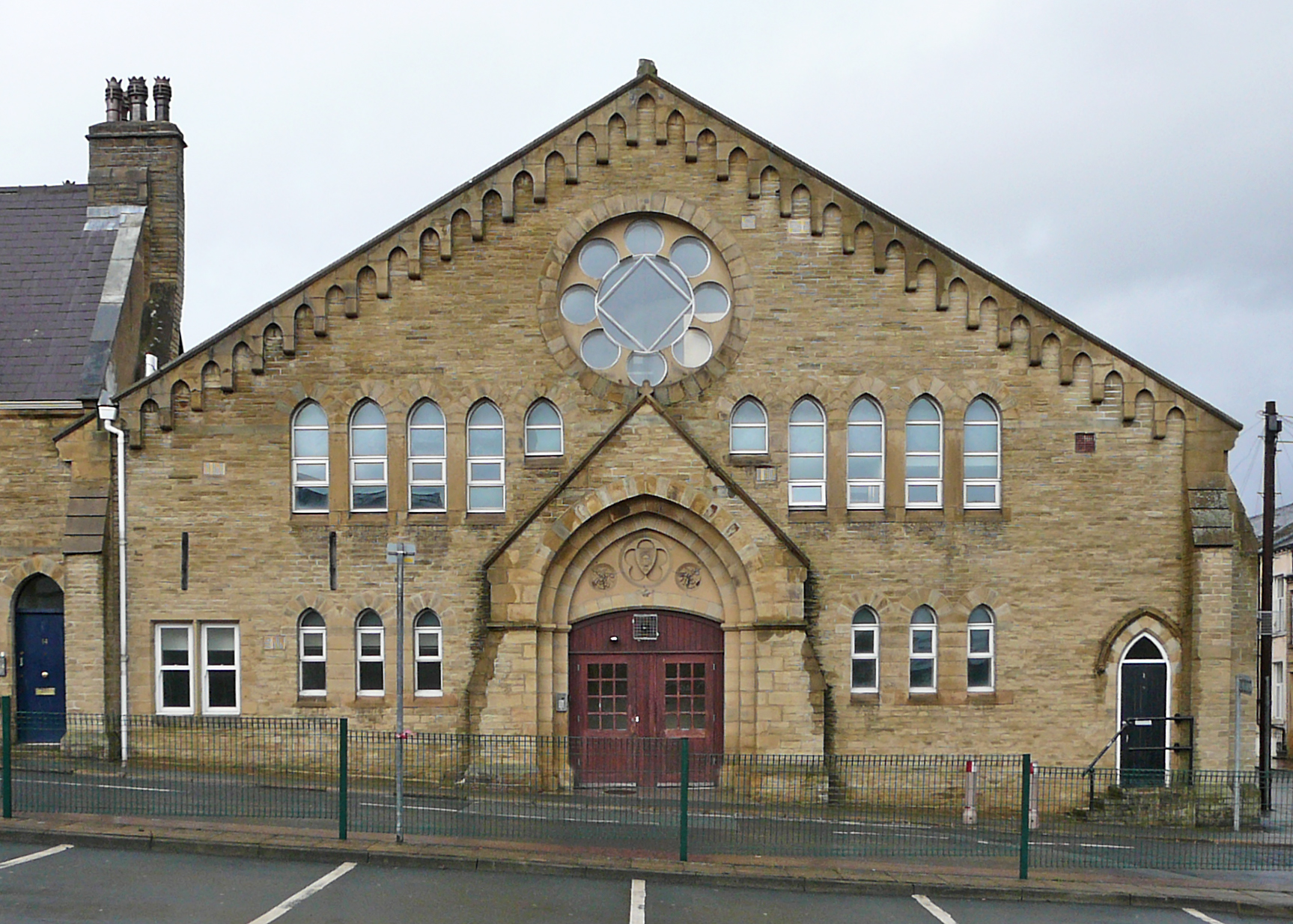
- Prescott Street drill hall

Site information
- Type: Drill hall

Location
- Location in West Yorkshire
- Coordinates: 53.71960°N 1.85816°W

Site history
- Built: 1868–1870
- Built for: War Office
- In use: 1870–1999

The Prescott Street drill hall is a former military installation in Halifax, West Yorkshire, England. It is a Grade II listed building.

== History ==
The building was designed by Richard Coad as the headquarters of the 4th West Yorkshire Rifle Volunteer Corps and was built between 1868 and 1870. This unit evolved to become the 1st Volunteer Battalion, The Duke of Wellington's Regiment in 1883 and the 4th Battalion, The Duke of Wellington's Regiment in 1908. The battalion was mobilised at the drill hall in August 1914 before being deployed to the Western Front.

The 4th Battalion, The Duke of Wellington's Regiment converted to become the 58th (4th Bn Duke of Wellington's Regiment) Anti-Tank Regiment, Royal Artillery in 1938 and, after service in the Second World War, evolved to become the 382nd (Duke of Wellington's) Regiment, Royal Artillery in 1947; it converted back to form the West Riding Battalion, The Duke of Wellington's Regiment (West Riding) in 1961.

However, the presence at the Prescott Street drill hall was reduced to one company, A Company, the West Riding Battalion, The Duke of Wellington's Regiment (West Riding) at that time. This unit evolved to become C Company (The Duke of Wellington's), Yorkshire Volunteers in 1967 and B (The Duke of Wellington's Regiment) Company, 3rd Battalion, The Duke of Wellington's Regiment (West Riding) (Yorkshire Volunteers) in 1993. After the company disbanded in 1999, the drill hall was decommissioned and converted for residential use.

== See also ==
- Listed buildings in Halifax, West Yorkshire
