= Copley, West Yorkshire =

Village in West Yorkshire, England

Coordinates: 53.698°N 1.871°W

Copley
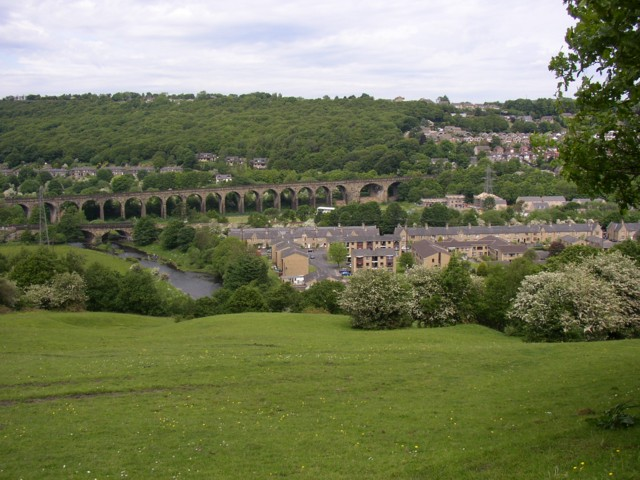
- Copley from Greetland

- Location within West Yorkshire
- Population: 1,541
- OS grid reference: SE0822
- Metropolitan borough: Calderdale
- Metropolitan county: West Yorkshire
- Region: Yorkshire and the Humber
- Country: England
- Sovereign state: United Kingdom
- Post town: HALIFAX
- Postcode district: HX3
- Dialling code: 01422
- Police: West Yorkshire
- Fire: West Yorkshire
- Ambulance: Yorkshire
- UK Parliament: Halifax

Copley is a village in the metropolitan borough of Calderdale, in the county of West Yorkshire, England, south of Halifax and east of Sowerby Bridge. It is situated by the River Calder and the Calder and Hebble Navigation canal.

== Facilities ==
It was served by Copley railway station from 1856 to 1931.

Today the village has a hairdressers, a health spa, a garage, Land Rover and Camper Van dealerships and one pub, The Volunteer Arms. St Stephen's Church, built in 1861-1865 by Colonel Edward Akroyd for the workers at his textile mill is an early work of the local architect William Henry Crossland.

The village has two sports clubs, Copley Cricket Club who play in the Halifax Cricket League and the Old Rishworthian rugby team. Both clubs are well established and Old Rishworthians currently play in Yorkshire 1 (level 7) of the RFU National League structure. Both clubs are located in picturesque settings with the Calder and Hebble Navigation to the north and the River Calder to the south. The main Leeds to Manchester railway line is near both grounds. Sporting events are held at both locations, as well as various other special functions throughout the year.

One of the key computer data centres for Lloyds Banking Group is located a few miles outside the village. This was formerly the main data centre for HBOS before the merger between Lloyds and HBOS.

== Education ==
Copley Primary School is situated on Wakefield Road in Copley which sits within the catchment area for Ryburn Valley High School.

== Notable people ==
- Christina Marshall Colville (1852–1936), temperance leader

== See also ==
- Listed buildings in Halifax, West Yorkshire
