= Coal drop =

Elevated railway track through which goods fall

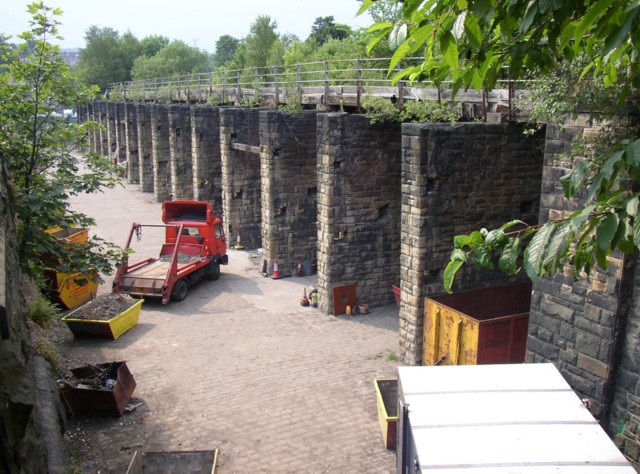
Coal drops, Station Road, Sowerby Bridge

A coal drop is an elevated railway track designed to allow material to fall freely between the rails onto the ground beneath. It is used to rapidly unload hoppers containing coal and other bulk cargo. It is also referred to, in North East England, as a staith.

Coal drops were particularly associated on British railways with the North Eastern Railway, which built them at many stations. It used a standard fleet of wagons with bottom doors.

== See also ==
- Coal trestle
