= Square Chapel =

Building in Halifax, West Yorkshire, England

Coordinates: 53.7217°N 1.8556°W

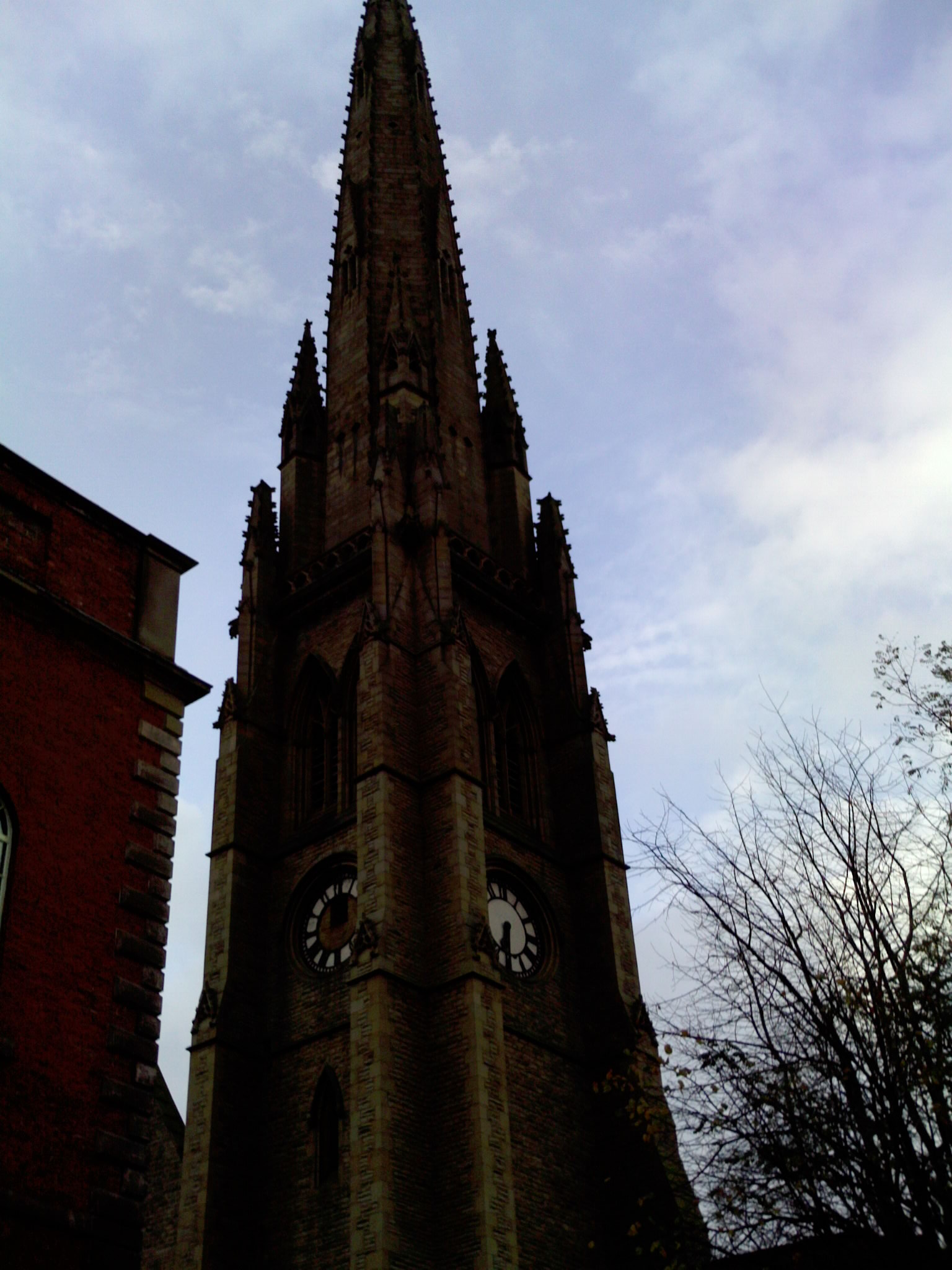
Square Church spire, Square Chapel is to the left of the picture

The Square Chapel in Halifax, West Yorkshire, England, was designed by Thomas Bradley and James Kershaw at the instigation of Titus Knight, a local preacher. Construction started in 1772 and the chapel was visited by John Wesley in July of that year.

The Congregationalist chapel was typical of Nonconformist design in offering an uninterrupted view of the preacher, having no internal supporting structures. As its name suggests, the chapel has a square base. Atypically for the Calderdale region, it was built of red brick rather than local stone.

In the 1850s a new chapel, which became the Square Congregational Church, was built on a site to the north, adjoining the chapel; the 1772 building was then used as a Sunday school.

The steeple of the Square Congregational Church survives; the rest of the building was demolished in 1976. The steeple has been incorporated into a library built on the site of the church. Since 1992 the chapel has been used as an arts centre. The steeple and the chapel are Grade II* listed buildings.
