= King Cross =

Ecclesiastical parish in West Yorkshire, England

Coordinates: 53.7160°N 1.8790°W

- Ecclesiastical Parish
- Location within West Yorkshire
- OS grid reference: SE075242
- Metropolitan borough: Calderdale
- Metropolitan county: West Yorkshire
- Region: Yorkshire and the Humber
- Country: England
- Sovereign state: United Kingdom
- Police: West Yorkshire
- Fire: West Yorkshire
- Ambulance: Yorkshire
- UK Parliament: Halifax

King Cross, originally the site of an ancient stone cross, is an ecclesiastical parish created in 1845 in the Metropolitan Borough of Calderdale, West Yorkshire, England. Part of the Diocese of Wakefield, it is located along the top of a ridge above the town of Halifax. The A58 road into Lancashire divides here, with one fork, the A646, branching off towards Burnley via Hebden Bridge and the other going to Littleborough via Sowerby Bridge. During the English Civil War, when Halifax was a Royalist stronghold, King Cross was a key outpost, with the Parliamentarians holding parts of the Calder Valley.

== History ==
During the First English Civil War (1642–1646) Halifax was a Royalist stronghold, with King Cross as a key outpost, on the roads between Lancashire and West Yorkshire, with the Parliamentarians holding parts of the Calder Valley.

Before 1850, the area consisted of small hamlets and agricultural fields, in the parish of Halifax. With the onset of the Industrial Revolution, through the 18th and 19th centuries, the population steadily grew and King Cross was made a separate parish in 1845. A Commissioners' church, St Paul's, designed by Robert Chantrell in 1845, was built in 1847, with seating for 450 people.

By the end of the 19th century, with a population of some 17,000, the older church of St Paul's, built in 1847, had run out of space for burials. A decision was made in 1909 to build a new church designed by Sir Charles Nicholson, with seating for 1,000, nearby. Except for the tower, it was completed in 1912.

Following a fire in the old St Paul's in 1930, during which the roof was destroyed, the building was demolished in 1931, leaving only the tower and spire standing. With the increased space burials continued in the graveyard until 1969. With 1,737 graves in the graveyard, the church asked the local council to take over the maintenance of the grounds. The area was designated as a "rest garden" in 1973, though with some considerable controversy.

The current church of St Paul's is notable for its acoustics and an unusual and highly colourful west window, dedicated in 1937 in memory of Canon Hugh Bright and designed by Hugh Ray Easton of Cambridge, who had also designed windows for Canterbury Cathedral, Exeter Cathedral and Durham Cathedral. The window depicts an apocalyptic vision of the Holy City descending upon the smoky mills and railway viaducts of Halifax. The church was built from locally sourced stone, the inside walls being made of ashlar from the quarries at Sowerby, and the external walls of stone from the quarries of Northowram and Hipperholme.

The first vicar of the old St Paul's church, Reverend Samuel Danby, from 1847-1859, married Mary Dorothy Wainhouse, the daughter of Edward Wainhouse, the local dye works owner, who partly funded the building of the church. The stained glass east window, designed by H.W. Bryans, in the new St Paul's is dedicated in Edward Wainhouse's memory.

In 1905, the Reverend H.S. Footman, a curate of the old St Paul's church became the curate of the nearby St Hilda's Mission Church, built in 1898.

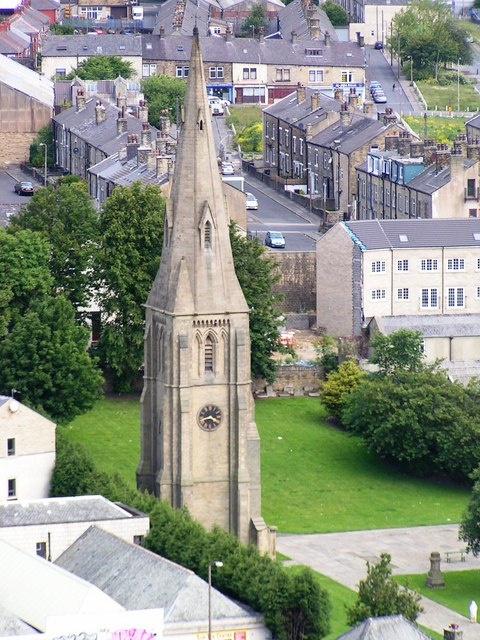
Spire of the old St Paul's church

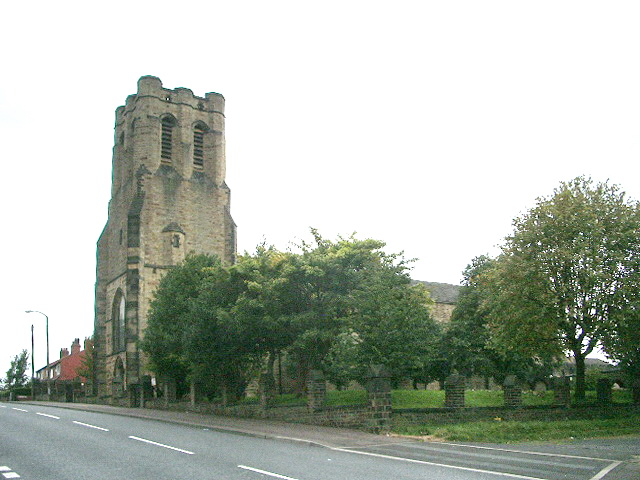
New St Paul's church

=== Cricket ===
The King Cross Cricket Club, was originally a Sunday School team known as the King Cross Wesleyan Cricket club, having been formed in 1878 by the Young Men’s Class at the King Cross Wesleyan School. Before moving to the Ramsden Ground in Upper Kingston in 1900, the club played at the nearby Savile Park Moor. The club’s pavilion at West View was known as "Duck House".

=== King Cross Prize Band ===
At some point in the late 1800s, a brass band, conducted by Arthur Peace, was formed in the parish and although little is known of its history it was known to have taken part in local band competitions, with some memorable instances. It appeared at a command performance for Queen Victoria. On 8 August 1902, it played before Edward VII at Buckingham Palace and on 21 June 1911 the band returned there to play before King George V and Queen Mary.

=== King Cross police sub-station ===
The area's first police station stood at the junction of Warley Road and Burnley Road on the site of a former Methodist chapel. The foundation stone was laid on 15 September 1910 and the station opened in May 1911. It had the Latin motto: "Ignorantia legis excusat neminem" ("Ignorance of the law excuses no-one") over the entrance. Following redevelopment in 1973, the building was demolished.

=== Wainhouse tower ===
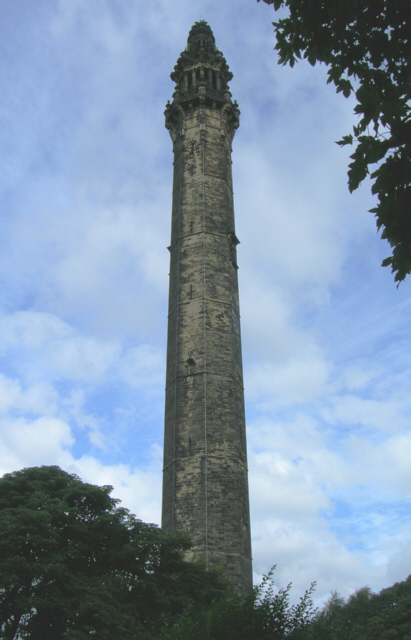
Wainhouse Tower

Wainhouse Tower, designed by the architect Isaac Booth, was originally designed as a chimney to serve the local dye works owned by John Edward Wainhouse, to satisfy the Smoke Abatement Act of 1870. Wainhouse was a keen advocate of smoke prevention and decided that a high chimney on the top of the hill would be beneficial for the townspeople. A much simpler chimney would have satisfied the requirements of the law, but with an interest in architecture Wainhouse insisted that it should be an object of beauty. It was erected in four years and completed on 9 September 1875, at a total cost of £14,000. It is the tallest structure in Calderdale and the tallest folly in the world. Internally, it is 253 feet (77 m) high and externally 275 feet (84 m), being built on sloping ground. It has an internal spiral staircase with 403 steps. The tower is maintained by Calderdale Borough Council and open to visitors at certain times of the year. An urban myth has arisen due to Wainhouse's long-standing conflict with his neighbour, Sir Henry Edwards, over water rights. Some people think that Wainhouse had built the tower solely in order to overlook Edwards' land after he had been made High Sheriff of Yorkshire in 1871.
