= Listed buildings in Ovenden =

Ovenden is a village and a ward to the north of Halifax in the metropolitan borough of Calderdale, West Yorkshire, England. It contains twelve listed buildings that are recorded in the National Heritage List for England. Of these, one is at Grade II*, the middle of the three grades, and the others are at Grade II, the lowest grade. Most of the listed buildings are houses, and the others consist of two churches and a drinking fountain.

== Key ==
Grade	Criteria
II*	Particularly important buildings of more than special interest
II	Buildings of national importance and special interest

== Buildings ==
Name and location	Photograph	Date	Notes	Grade
Blackhouse Fold; 53.75103°N 1.89564°W	—	17th century	A rendered stone house with a stone roof and two storeys that has been much altered. Some of the mullioned and transomed windows have been retained, and the others have been changed.	II
Ovenden Hall; 53.73953°N 1.8759°W		c. 1662	The house is in stone with stone roofs. There are two storeys, four gabled bays with finials, and a T-shaped rear service wing. The east bay is wider and contains a recessed porch with a moulded arched entrance, and in the gable apex is a sundial. The windows are mullioned and most are also transomed with ornamental hood moulds.	II*
Jack Royd; 53.73520°N 1.88411°W	—	Mid to late 17th century	A house, later divided into two, it is in stone with quoins, and a stone slate roof with coped gables and kneelers. There are two storeys, three bays, and a rear wing with a lower extension. The doorway has a chamfered surround, and the windows are mullioned.	II
5 Brackenbed Lane; 53.73192°N 1.88623°W	—	17th to early 18th century	The house is in rendered stone and has a stone roof. There are two storeys and a gabled rear wing. The doorway has a plain surround, and the windows are mullioned.	II
151 Shay Lane; 53.74697°N 1.87735°W	—	17th to early 18th century	A stone house, rendered at the front, it has a stone roof with the gable facing the road. There are two storeys, and the house contains a porch and a doorway with a plain surround. The windows have mullions, some of which are moulded and others are plain.	II
Walt Royd Farmhouse; 53.74216°N 1.89908°W	—	Late 17th to early 18th century	The farmhouse is in rendered stone and has a stone roof. There are two storeys and a lean-to at the rear. The doorway has a plain surround, there is an arched doorway in the lean-to, and the windows are mullioned.	II
4 and 6 Friendly Fold Road; 53.73743°N 1.87527°W	—	1709	A pair of stone houses with quoins and a stone roof. There are two storeys, and each house has one bay. In the centre are paired doorways; the right doorway has an arched lintel with an inscription and a date, and above it is a former sundial. The windows are mullioned, some have been altered, and those in the ground floor have hood moulds.	II
St Mary's Church; 53.75171°N 1.89606°W		1777	The chancel was added to the church in about 1888, and there were extensions to the west end in 1925. The church is built in stone with a slate roof, and consists of a nave, a south porch, a chancel with side chapel, and a west tower enclosed by later extensions. The tower has a shaped and partly pierced parapet with pinnacles. Along the sides of the nave are two tiers of round-arched windows. At the east end is a Venetian window with a decorative surround including swags and urns, and above it is a pediment containing a smaller pediment, a circular window and floral swags.	II
Illingworth Hall Farmhouse; 53.75029°N 1.89527°W	—	c. 1780	The farmhouse is in stone, and has a stone slate roof with coped gables and kneelers. There are two storeys and three bays. The windows are mullioned and contain casements, including a six-light weavers' window in the upper floor.	II
United Reformed Church; 53.74342°N 1.88384°W		1837	The church is in sandstone with a stone slate roof. It has a front of three bays with a pedimented gable and kneelers. The middle bay is recessed and arched, and contains an arched doorway with a keystone. Above and in the outer bays are windows. Along the sides are two storeys and five bays with two tiers of windows.	II
Drinking fountain 53.73198°N 1.87724°W		Mid to late 19th century	The drinking fountain is in Shrogg's Park, and is in elaborate Gothic style. It is in stone and has a square plan, with a stepped base, four basins fed by dolphins, and an elaborate canopy carried on circular columns. The canopy is vaulted and has gablets and a finial.	II
The Fold; 53.73534°N 1.88791°W	—	Undated	A stone house with a stone roof and two storeys. There are three gables on the garden front. The windows are mullioned or mullioned and transomed.	II
