= Halifax power station =

Former coal-fired power station in England

- Country: England
- Location: Halifax, West Yorkshire
- Coordinates: 53°43′34″N 01°51′28″W
- Status: Decommissioned and demolished
- Commission date: 1894
- Decommission date: Late 1960s
- Owners: Halifax Corporation (1894–1948); British Electricity Authority (1948–1955); Central Electricity Authority (1955–1957); Central Electricity Generating Board (1958–1970)
- Operator: As owner

Thermal power station
- Primary fuel: Coal
- Turbine technology: Steam turbines
- Cooling towers: 6 (wooden)
- Cooling source: Circulating cooling water

Power generation
- Units operational: see text
- Make and model: British Thomson-Houston - Curtis; Brush-Ljungstrom
- Nameplate capacity: 48.3 MW
- Annual net output: 118 MW (1946)

Halifax power station supplied electricity to the town of Halifax and the wider area from 1894 to the 1960s. It was owned and operated by Halifax Corporation until the nationalisation of the electricity supply industry in 1948. The power station was redeveloped several times and at its peak had a generating capacity of 48 MW.

== History ==
In 1892 Halifax Corporation applied for a provisional order under the Electric Lighting Acts to generate and supply electricity to the town. The Halifax Corporation Electric Lighting Order 1892 was granted by the Board of Trade and was confirmed by Parliament through the Electric Lighting Orders Confirmation (No. 2) Act 1892 (55 & 56 Vict. c. xxxvii). The power station was built in Foundry Street Halifax (53°43′34″N 1°51′28″W) and first supplied electricity in December 1894. In the previous year the Halifax municipal refuse destructor was the first in Britain to generate electricity from refuse. This comprised a Livet steam generator driving a Parsons turbo-alternator with a capacity of 25,000 candle power (about 355 kW).

== Equipment specification ==
The original plant at Halifax power station comprised vertical and horizontal engines coupled directly and by ropes to ECC alternators. In 1898 the generating capacity was 600 kW and the maximum load was 295 kW.

=== Plant in 1920s ===
New plant was installed to meet growing demand for electricity. By 1923 the generating plant comprised:

Coal-fired boilers generating up to 235,000 lb/h (29.6 kg/s) of steam, these supplied steam to:

- Generators:
  - 1 × 700 kW reciprocating engine driving a direct current generator
  - 1 × 1,500 kW steam turbo-alternator, 6.6 kV
  - 1 × 3,500 kW steam turbo-alternator, 6.6 kV
  - 1 × 6,000 kW steam turbo-alternator, 6.6 kV
  - 1 × 10,000 kW British Thomson-Houston Co steam turbo-alternator, 6.6kV (This machine was the first to run at 3000 RPM).

These machines gave a total generating capacity of 21,000 kW of alternating current and 700 kW DC.

A further 10,000 kW British Thomson-Houston Co steam turbo-alternator, 6.6kV was installed in 1925.

A variety of electricity supplies were available to consumers:

- 3-phase, 50 Hz AC at 400 & 230 Volts
- DC 460 & 230 Volts

=== Plant in 1955 ===
New plant was commissioned as older plant was retired. By the 1950s Halifax power station comprised:

- Boilers:
  - 2 × Babcock & Wilcox boilers with chain grate stokers, each 100,000 lb/h (12.6 kg/s), steam conditions 370 psi and 750°F (25.5 bar, 399°C)
  - 2 × Babcock & Wilcox boilers with chain grate stokers, each 110,000 lb/h (13.86 kg/s), steam conditions 370 psi and 750°F (25.5 bar, 399°C)

The boilers had a total evaporative capacity of 420,000 lb/h (52.9 kg/s), and supplied steam to:

- Turbo-alternators:
  - 1 × British Thomson-Houston - Curtis 10 MW turbo-alternator, operating at 200 psi and 640°F (13.79 bar and 338°C)
  - 1 × British Thomson-Houston - Curtis 12 MW turbo-alternator, operating at 350 psi and 750/775°F (24.1 bar and 399/413°C)
  - 1 × British Thomson-Houston - Curtis 7.8 MW turbo-alternator, operating at 350 psi and 750/775°F (24.1 bar and 399/413°C)
  - 1 × Brush-Ljungstrom 18.5 MW turbo-alternator, operating at 350 psi and 750/775°F (24.1 bar and 399/413°C)

The total installed generating capacity was 48.3 MW, with an output capacity of 37 MW.

Condenser cooling water was cooled in six 2.9 million gallons per hour (3.66 m^{3}/s) wooden cooling towers.

== Operations ==
In 1898 maximum electricity demand was 295 kW. There was the equivalent of 20,800 8-candle power lamps on the system. There were 26 public lamps. The station delivered 218,707 kWh of electricity to 305 customers.

In the 1920s there was a deep distrust between the municipal electricity undertaking such as Halifax and Huddersfield and the Yorkshire Power Company. The Halifax and Huddersfield electricity undertakings laid, at considerable expense, an underground cable between their systems. This was despite the fact that there was an existing overhead line operated by the Yorkshire Power Company. And that the power company would have supplied electricity below the cost that the undertakings could generate electricity.

=== Operating data 1921–23 ===
The operating data for the period 1921–23 is shown in the table:

Halifax power station operating data 1921–23
Electricity Use	Units	Year		
Electricity Use	Units	1921	1922	1923
Lighting and domestic use	MWh	2,233	2,166	2,670
Public lighting use	MWh	31	43	57
Traction	MWh	5,565	5,367	5,548
Power use	MWh	10,241	7,645	10,858
Bulk supply	MWh	452	577	714
Total use	MWh	18,521	15,797	19,847
Load and connected load
Maximum load	kW	8,790	8,350	10,255
Total connections	kW	25,858	27,454	28,995
Load factor	Per cent	26.2	23.3	24.4
Financial
Revenue from sales of current	£	–	164,587	156,768
Surplus of revenue over expenses	£	–	57,418	70,849

The growth of demand and use of electricity is evident.

Under the terms of the Electricity (Supply) Act 1926 (16-17 Geo. 5 c. 51) the Central Electricity Board (CEB) was established in 1926. The CEB identified high efficiency 'selected' power stations that would supply electricity most effectively; Halifax was designated a selected station. The CEB also constructed the national grid (1927–33) to connect power stations within a region.

=== Operating data 1946 ===
Halifax power station operating data for 1946 is given below:

Halifax power station operating data, 1946
Year	Load factor per cent	Max output load MW	Electricity supplied GWh	Thermal efficiency per cent
1946	32.7	41,410	118.479	16.87

The British electricity supply industry was nationalised in 1948 under the provisions of the Electricity Act 1947 (10-11 Geo. 6 c. 54). The Halifax electricity undertaking was abolished, ownership of Halifax power station was vested in the British Electricity Authority, and subsequently the Central Electricity Authority and the Central Electricity Generating Board (CEGB). At the same time the electricity distribution and sales responsibilities of the Halifax electricity undertaking were transferred to the Yorkshire Electricity Board (YEB).

=== Operating data 1954–67 ===
Operating data for the period 1954–67 is shown in the table:

Halifax power station operating data, 1954–67
Year	Running hours or load factor (per cent)	Max output capacity MW	Electricity supplied GWh	Thermal efficiency per cent
1954	3328	41	58.759	16.78
1955	3859	41	75.606	16.67
1956	3531	41	57.694	16.12
1957	3144	41	42.101	16.29
1958	2898	41	39.167	16.17
1961	(11.8 %)	37	38.280	16.53
1962	(14.6 %)	37	47.306	15.76
1963	(11.93 %)	37	38.673	14.99
1967	(5.0 %)	34.3	16.150	13.78

== Closure ==
Halifax power station was decommissioned in the late 1960s. The buildings were subsequently demolished and the area has been redeveloped with industrial and commercial units. However, the location is still the site of Halifax 132 kV substation.

== See also ==
- Timeline of the UK electricity supply industry
- List of power stations in England
