= Calderdale Industrial Museum =

Coordinates: 53.7223°N 1.8560°W

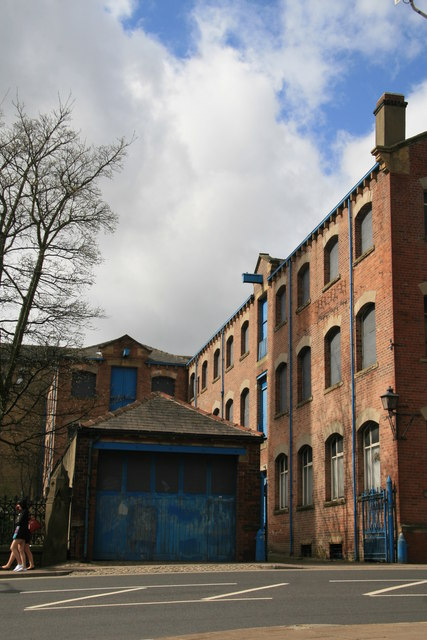
Museum buildings

Calderdale Industrial Museum is a museum in the town of Halifax, West Yorkshire, England, dedicated to the industrial heritage of the area. The museum contains a number of working machines built between 1850 – 1930 all of which were either built or used in Halifax.

The museum was initially opened in 1987 and received funding and support from Calderdale Metropolitan Council, although the museum and concept were leased to a private trust in February 2014. The museum was closed for renovation until September 2017.

The museum is run by the volunteers of Calderdale Industrial Museum Association and receives no direct funding. It is currently open every Saturday from 10:00 till 16:00. An entry fee is charged to cover the every day overheads and current development projects.
