= Ovenden =

Village in West Yorkshire, England

Coordinates: 53.743241°N 1.877863°W

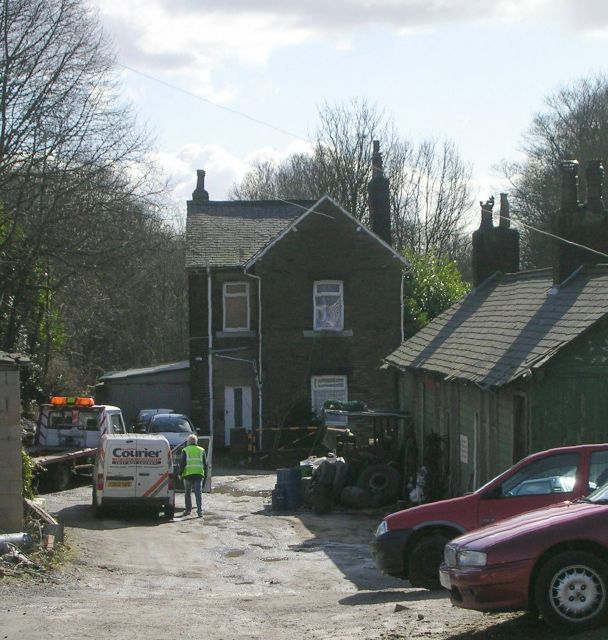
- Ovenden railway building

- Location within West Yorkshire
- Population: 12,351 (Ward. 2011)
- OS grid reference: SE081274
- Metropolitan borough: Calderdale
- Metropolitan county: West Yorkshire
- Region: Yorkshire and the Humber
- Country: England
- Sovereign state: United Kingdom
- Post town: HALIFAX
- Postcode district: HX3, HX2
- Police: West Yorkshire
- Fire: West Yorkshire
- Ambulance: Yorkshire

Ovenden is a village in West Yorkshire, England, next to Boothtown and Illingworth about a mile from Halifax town centre. It is also a Calderdale Ward whose population at the 2011 Census was 12,351.

The name Ovenden derives from the Old English Ofadenu meaning 'Ofa's valley'.

The area was scattered with pockets of Victorian streets and shops and nearby mills for the residents, after the Second World War much of the rural area in-between the Victorian settlements was redeveloped with council housing, prefabricated buildings, shopping complexes, A secondary modern school, two primary schools one state run the other a Catholic one. A new Catholic Church was constructed to cater for the large Irish community that relocated to the area from West Central Halifax. The area is mainly working class although there are some affluent Victorian properties and streets mixed in with the social modern housing.

Ovenden railway station on the Halifax and Ovenden Junction Railway Line closed in 1955 to passengers but the line remained open until 1960 to allow freight train to access St Paul's station on the west side of Halifax. It is now used as a garage with buildings constructed on the old rail line covering the front entrance of a tunnel that the trains used to run through. Parts of the television series Happy Valley were filmed in the Grove area of the village.

Ovenden rugby league club competed in the National Conference League up until 2015 before having to withdraw due to a lack of players and finance. Similarly, Ovenden West Riding football team folded in August 2016 for the same reason of not having enough players to field a team.

The Ridings School in Ovenden gained national notoriety as one of the worst schools in the UK. It closed in 2009 and parts of it have been converted into a doctors surgery and sports centre with rest of the school leased to a not-for-profit organisation, Threeways, who plan to open a community hub with fitness, sport and entertainment facilities.

Ovenden was formerly a township in the parish of Halifax; from 1866 to 1894 Ovenden was a separate civil parish. In 1891 the parish had a population of 13,458.

== Champion Jack Dupree ==
In the 1970s and 1980s, Ovenden was the home of New Orleans blues and boogie woogie pianist Champion Jack Dupree. A bronze plaque has been erected in his memory.

== See also ==
- Listed buildings in Ovenden
