= Huddersfield power station =

Former power station in Huddersfield, West Yorkshire, England

- Country: England
- Location: Huddersfield West Yorkshire
- Coordinates: 53°39′11″N 01°46′27″W
- Status: Decommissioned and demolished
- Construction began: 1891
- Commission date: 1893
- Decommission date: 1981
- Owners: Huddersfield Corporation (1893–1948); British Electricity Authority (1948–1955); Central Electricity Authority (1955–1957); Central Electricity Generating Board (1958–1981)
- Operator: As owner

Thermal power station
- Primary fuel: Coal
- Turbine technology: Steam turbines
- Chimneys: 1
- Cooling towers: 3
- Cooling source: Cooling towers

Power generation
- Units operational: 2 x 20 MW, 2 x 30 MW (after 1955)
- Make and model: English Electric 20 MW, GEC 30 MW
- Nameplate capacity: 100 MW installed, output 94 MW
- Annual net output: 417 GWh (1962)

Huddersfield power station supplied electricity to the town of Huddersfield and the wider area from 1893 to 1981. It was owned and operated by Huddersfield Corporation until the nationalisation of the electricity supply industry in 1948. The power station was redeveloped several times: including the incorporation of new plant in the 1910s, and in the 1930s to 1950s. The station was decommissioned in October 1981.

Another power station, together with car sheds and offices, was located at Longroyd Bridge which supplied the Huddersfield tram system with electricity from 1901 to 1940.

== History ==
In 1890 Huddersfield Corporation applied for a provisional order under the Electric Lighting Acts to generate and supply electricity to the town. The Huddersfield Electric Lighting Order 1890 was granted by the Board of Trade and was confirmed by Parliament through the Electric Lighting Orders Confirmation (No. 3) Act 1890 (53 & 54 Vict. c. clxxxviii). The power station was built in St. Andrew's Road (53°39′11″N 1°46′27″W) and first supplied electricity on 29 June 1893.

== Equipment specification ==
The original plant at Huddersfield power station comprised vertical condensing engines coupled directly and by ropes to Ferranti and Mordey dynamos. In 1898 the generating capacity was 1,150 kW and the maximum load was 636 kW.

=== Post-war plant ===
Following the First World War new plant was installed to meet growing demand for electricity. By 1923 the generating plant comprised:

- Coal-fired boilers generating up to 315,000 lb/h (39.7 kg/s) of steam, these supplied steam to:
- Generators:
  - 3 × 600 kW reciprocating engines driving generators
  - 2 × 750 kW steam turbo-alternators
  - 2 × 2,000 kW steam turbo-alternators
  - 1 × 4,000 kW steam turbo-alternator
  - 1 × 6,000 kW steam turbo-alternator

These machines gave a total generating capacity of 17,300 kW of alternating current.

A variety of electricity supplies were available to consumers as:

- single phase, 100 Hz AC at 100 and 200 Volts
- single phase, 50 Hz AC, at 100 and 200 Volts
- 3-phase, 50 Hz AC at 400 Volts.

In the early 1920s the Halifax and Huddersfield electricity undertakings interconnected their systems with an underground cable to share supplies. This facility was constructed at considerable cost rather than taking a supply from the Yorkshire Power Company, even though it was offered at a price less than their own costs of generation.

In September 1928 2 × 6MW English Electric turbo alternators were added and the site had a total generating capacity of 23.5MW. There were 13 Stirling boilers capable of 380,000Ib/h steaming capacity and a refuse destructor that could produce 48,000 Ib/h

=== New plant 1938–1955 ===
New plant was commissioned over the extended period of 1938–1955.

- Boilers:
  - 4 × Stirling boilers with chain grate stokers, each 120,000 lb/h (15.1 kg/s), steam conditions 360 and 380 psi and 750 °F (24.8/26.2 bar, 400 °C),
  - 4 × Bennis boilers each 180,000 lb/h (22.7 kg/s) with TG stokers, steam conditions 625 psi and 865 °F (43.1 bar, 463 °C),

The boilers had a total evaporative capacity of 1,200,000 lb/h (151.2 kg/s), and supplied steam to:

- Turbo-alternators:
  - 2 × English Electric 20 MW turbo-alternator, generating at 6.8 kV
  - 2 × GEC 30 MW, turbo-alternators, generating at 11.8 kV.

The completed total installed generating capacity was 100 MW, with an output capacity 64 MW. The generating sets were commissioned over an extended period: November 1938, November 1946, December 1953, and July 1955.

12 MW of Low Pressure plant was removed from service in 1952/53.

- Condenser cooling water was cooled in three 2.6 million gallons per hour (3.28 m^{3}/s) Davenport concrete cooling towers, make-up water was drawn from the River Colne and canal.

== Operations ==
Operational data for the early years of operation was as follows:

Huddersfield operational data 1893–98
Year	Consumers	Lamps	Electricity sold MWh
1893	112	9,613	43.2
1894	214	15,342	156.2
1895	280	28,983	227.8
1896	385	28,983	304.2
1897	598	41,702	438.8
1898	?	43,309	379.8

The growth in number of consumers, lamps and current sold is evident.

In 1898 maximum electricity demand was 375 kW.

=== Operating data 1921–23 ===
The operating data for the period 1921–23 is shown in the table:

Huddersfield power station operating data 1921–23
Electricity Use	Units	Year		
Electricity Use	Units	1921	1922	1923
Lighting and domestic use	MWh	2,816.50	2,242.24	3,029.49
Public lighting use	MWh	84.99	98.74	113.94
Traction	MWh	–	–	1,919.68
Power use	MWh	14,166.96	11,072.66	12,991.78
Total use	MWh	17,068.44	14,013.64	18,054.87
Load and connected load
Maximum load	kW	7245	7870	9060
Total connections	kW	30,515	33,250	34,889
Load factor	Per cent	33.9	28.2	30.2
Financial
Revenue from sales of current	£	–	193,516	180,870
Surplus of revenue over expenses	£	–	40,703	62,771

The growth of demand and use of electricity is evident.

Under the terms of the Electricity (Supply) Act 1926 (16 & 17 Geo. 5. c. 51) the Central Electricity Board (CEB) was established in 1926. The CEB identified high efficiency 'selected' power stations that would supply electricity most effectively; Huddersfield was designated a selected station. The CEB also constructed the national grid (1927–33) to connect power stations within a region.

=== Operating data 1946 ===
Huddersfield power station operating data, 1946 is given in the table:

Huddersfield power station operating data, 1946
Year	Load factor per cent	Max output load MW	Electricity supplied GWh	Thermal efficiency per cent
1946	41.9	50,650	184.776	–

The British electricity supply industry was nationalised in 1948 under the provisions of the Electricity Act 1947 (10 & 11 Geo. 6. c. 54). The Huddersfield electricity undertaking was abolished, ownership of Huddersfield power station was vested in the British Electricity Authority, and subsequently the Central Electricity Authority and the Central Electricity Generating Board (CEGB). At the same time the electricity distribution and sales responsibilities of the Huddersfield electricity undertaking were transferred to the Yorkshire Electricity Board (YEB).

=== Operating data 1954–79 ===
Operating data for the period 1954–79 is shown in the table:

Huddersfield power station operating data, 1954–79
Year	Running hours or load factor (per cent)	Maximum output capacity MW	Electricity supplied GWh	Thermal efficiency per cent
Low pressure plant (English Electric 20 MW turbo-alternators)
1954	8582	38	249.157	22.13
1955	6494	38	161.504	21.04
1956	5137	38	118.395	20.28
1957	3218	38	43.803	19.02
1958	3582	38	60.023	18.85
High pressure plant (GEC 30 MW turbo-alternators)
1955	7849	28	196.256	25.96
1956	8557	56	278.583	25.65
1957	8080	56	372.432	24.71
1958	7582	56	352.781	25.46
Combined plant
1961	42.4 %	94	349.068	22.60
1962	50.6 %	94	416.718	22.69
1963	44.9 %	94	369.670	22.50
1967	44.7 %	94	368.187	22.94
1972	30.3 %	94	249.934	21.18
1979	16.3 %	56	80.030	20.83

The less intensive use of the "low pressure" plant over the period 1954-8 and the increasing use of the high pressure plant 1955–63 is evident, until its usage also declined in the 1970s.

== Closure ==
Huddersfield power station was decommissioned on 26 October 1981. The buildings subsequently demolished and the area has been redeveloped with industrial and commercial units.

== See also ==
- Timeline of the UK electricity supply industry
- List of power stations in England
