= Brian Highley =

British screenwriter

Brian Highley (born 22 December 1943 in Halifax, West Riding of Yorkshire) is an English writer and watercolour artist.

== Biography ==
Brian Highley was born in Halifax, West Riding of Yorkshire, England. Following a short career in teaching, he became involved with the music industry and is credited (in Elton John's 2019 autobiography Me and in Ben Graham's 2020 book Pink Floyd are Fogbound in Paris) with giving Elton John his first major gig at the ill-fated August 1970 Yorkshire Folk, Blues and Jazz Festival (the Krumlin Festival). His music promotion career continued into the late 1970s with events headlined by the Police, the Stranglers, the Pretenders, and many of the chart bands from the punk era.

He was a UK TV scriptwriter for Spitting Image, and feature writer for national magazines.

In 1984 Highley became a UK question writer for Trivial Pursuit. He was initially recruited to write questions for the UK 'Young Player's' edition. His contribution led to him being involved in the Trivial Pursuit creators' new game, UBI. He researched and wrote all of the questions for the 1990 BBC 1 game show Trivial Pursuit and for 27 years was the sole writer of Trivial Pursuit board games for the UK.

Highley also produced the questions for the UK edition of the Swedish board game Insikt, for UK UBI, which was the follow-up to Trivial Pursuit and for the American games Been There Done That and TimeTripper.

His 2012 Trivial Pursuit projects were exclusively for the US market. The Trivial Pursuit Rolling Stones Collector's Edition, on which his editor was former Rolling Stones bassist Bill Wyman and the Classic Rock Edition.

== Books ==
Seven books by Brian Highley are available in paperback:

- In Pursuit of Trivia (2015), (a memoir) rewrite Second Edition October 2021.
- Stuff They Didn't Teach You in School (2017), (a miscellany of unusual and humorous facts)
- The Quizmaster's Quiz Book (2019)
- Quizmaster's Multiple Choice Quiz Book (2021)
- City, Town and Village Trivia (2020) (Lesser known facts about locations in England, Scotland and Wales)
- 70 Years of Number One Hits, Amazon, November 2022.
- ’’The Quizmaster’s Second Multiple Choice Quiz Book’’ 2000 questions with multiple choice answers. Amazon, January 2024.
