= St Mary's Church, Halifax =

St Mary's Church
- St Marie's Church
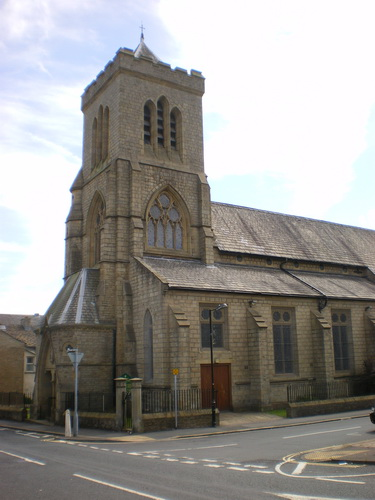
- St Mary's Church
- 53.723256°N 1.868257°W
- OS grid reference: SE 08792 25205
- Location: Halifax
- Country: England
- Denomination: Roman Catholic
- Website: StMarysHalifax.com

History
- Status: Parish church
- Dedication: Blessed Virgin Mary
- Events: Rebuilt in 1864; Enlarged in 1924

Architecture
- Functional status: Active
- Architect(s): Ralph Nicholson and Clement Williams
- Groundbreaking: 20 September 1836
- Completed: 27 November 1839
- Construction cost: Rebuild: £2,000; Extension: £11,000

Administration
- Province: Liverpool
- Diocese: Leeds
- Deanery: Halifax

St Mary's Church or St Marie's Church is a Roman Catholic Parish church in Halifax, West Yorkshire, England. It was built from 1836 to 1839. It is situated on the corner of Gibbet Street and Clarence Street, next to Burdock Way. It is the first Post-Reformation Roman Catholic church built in Halifax.

== History ==
=== Construction ===
In 1831, plans were drawn for the construction of a church and a fundraising campaign was started for it. On 20 September 1836, the foundation stone was laid. On 27 November 1839, the church was opened. However, on 18 October 1863, a storm caused part of the church to collapse.

=== Reconstruction ===
After the storm it was decided to repair and enlarge the church. On 8 October 1864, a new foundation stone was laid. The architect was Ralph Nicholson. The work included rebuilding the roof, arcades certain walls and adding a tower. The cost came to £2,000. Work continued up to 11 November 1865.

=== Extension ===
In 1923, work began again to extend the church. The architect Clement Williams designed it and extended the church from a capacity of 380 to 900. The total cost came to £11,000. On 9 November 1924, the church was reopened. However, work continued until 1926.

== Parish ==
Also in the parish of St Mary's is St Alban's Church. Clement Williams was also behind the designing of the church which was built from 1953 to 1954 and renovated in 1970.

St Mary's Church has two Sunday Masses: at 11:00 am and (in Polish) at 12:45 pm. St Alban's Church has two Sunday Masses: 9:30 am and 6:00 pm.

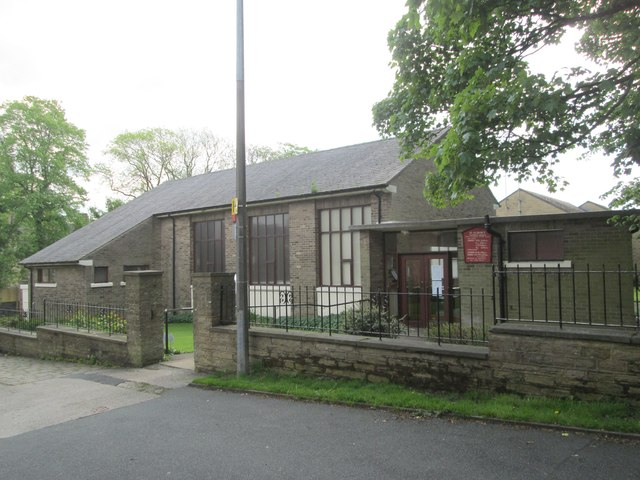
St Alban's Church

== See also ==
- Roman Catholic Diocese of Leeds
