= Savile Park, Halifax =

Open space in West Yorkshire, England

Coordinates: 53°42′39″N 1°52′22″W

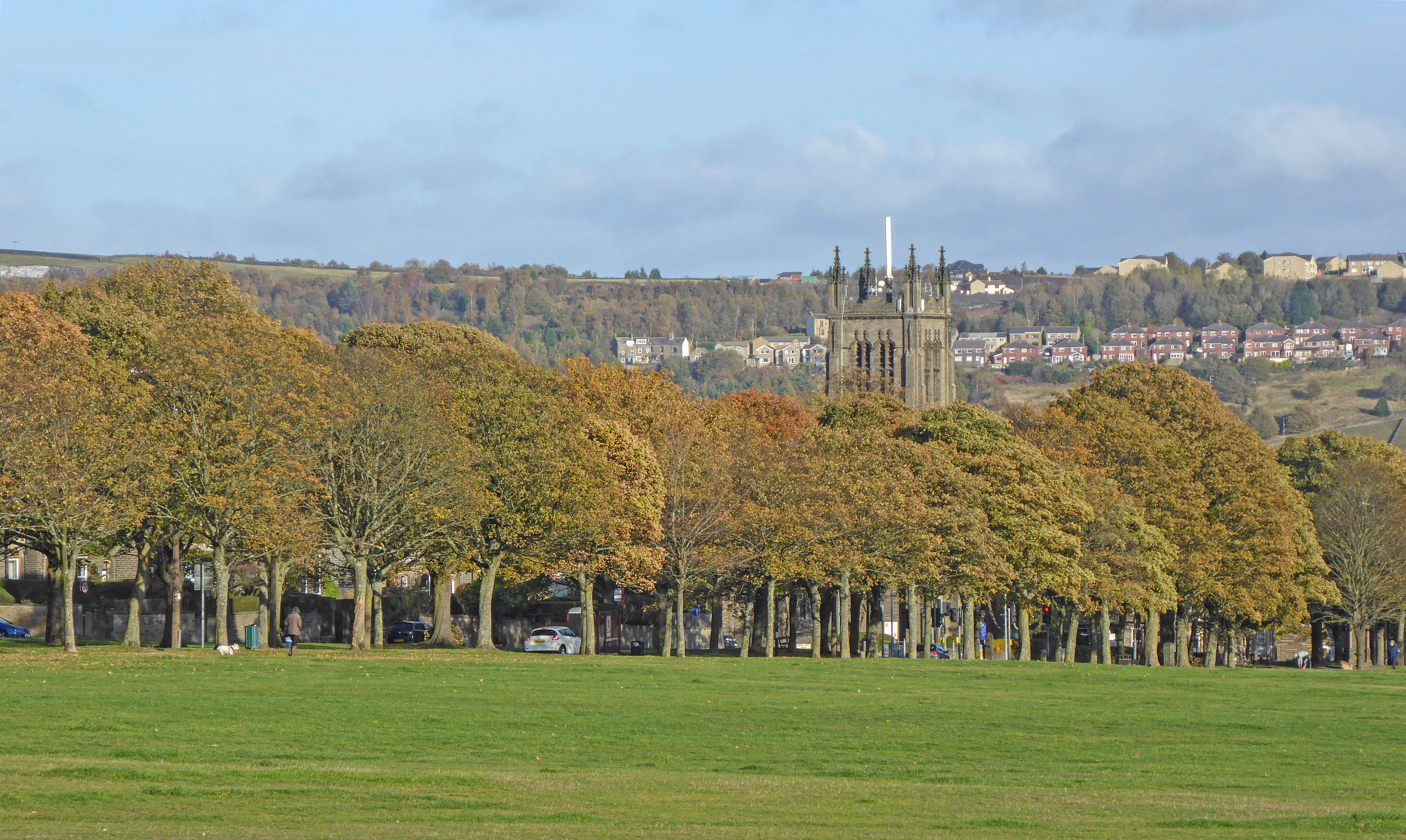

Savile Park is a public open space in Halifax in West Yorkshire, England, 1 mile (1.6 km) south west of the town centre. There are fine Victorian mansions around the edge of the park, and the park has given its name to a residential area to the north of the park. Crossley Heath School stands on the western edge of the park, and St Jude's Church, a Grade II listed building designed by William Swinden Barber, stands at the north east corner of the park.

The area of the park was historically known as Skircoat Moor or Halifax Moor. The park takes its current name from the Savile family, which held land in Halifax for centuries and in March 1866 sold land to be set apart as a recreation ground and to be called the Savile Park, on condition that "it remain unenclosed for perpetuity, and that the council do something about smoke abatement".
