= Halifax, West Yorkshire =

Town in West Yorkshire, England

Coordinates: 53.725°N 1.863°W

Halifax
- Town
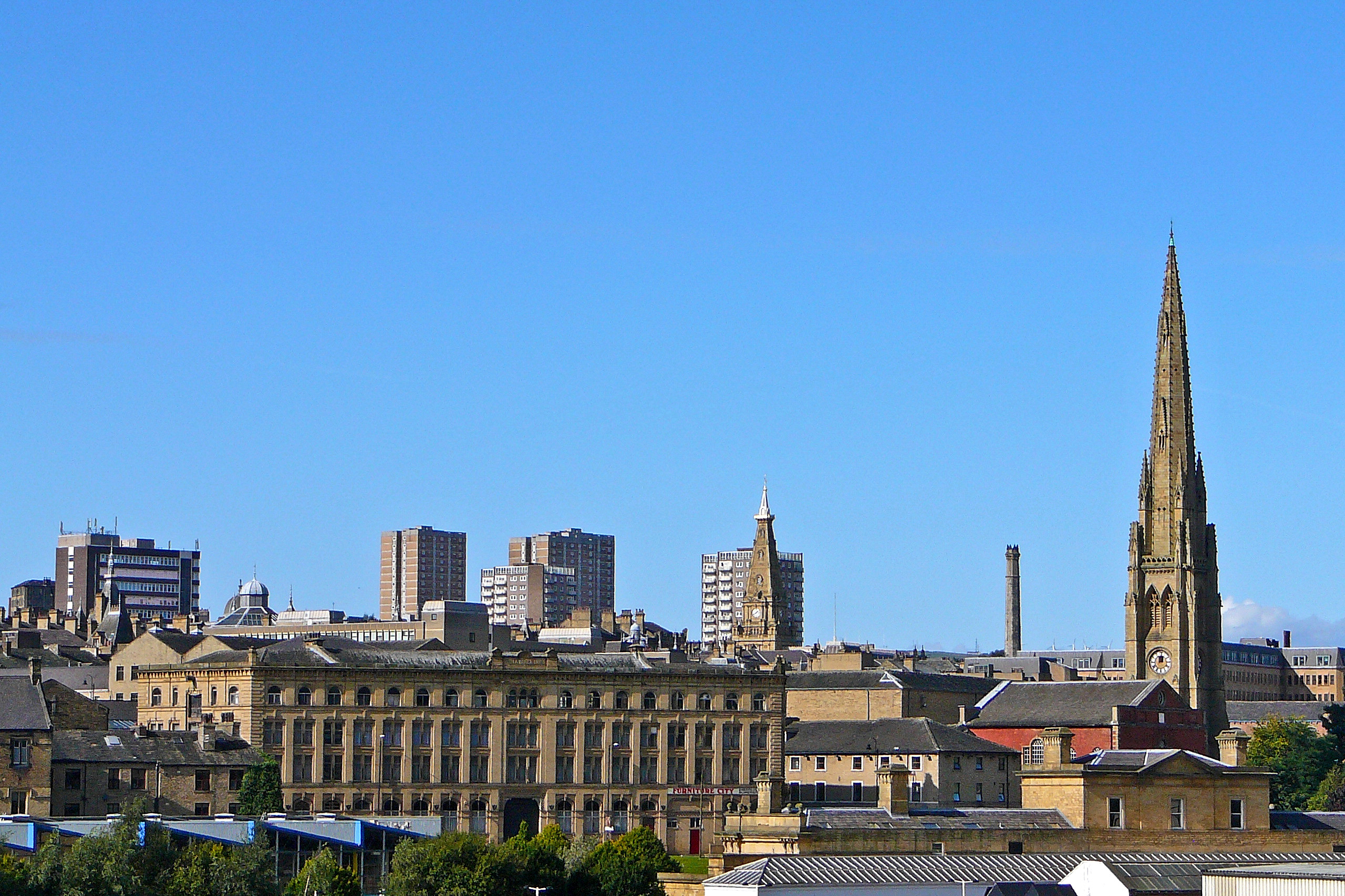
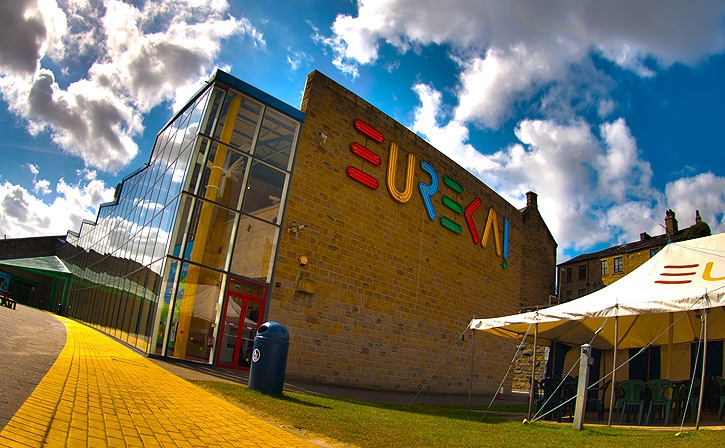
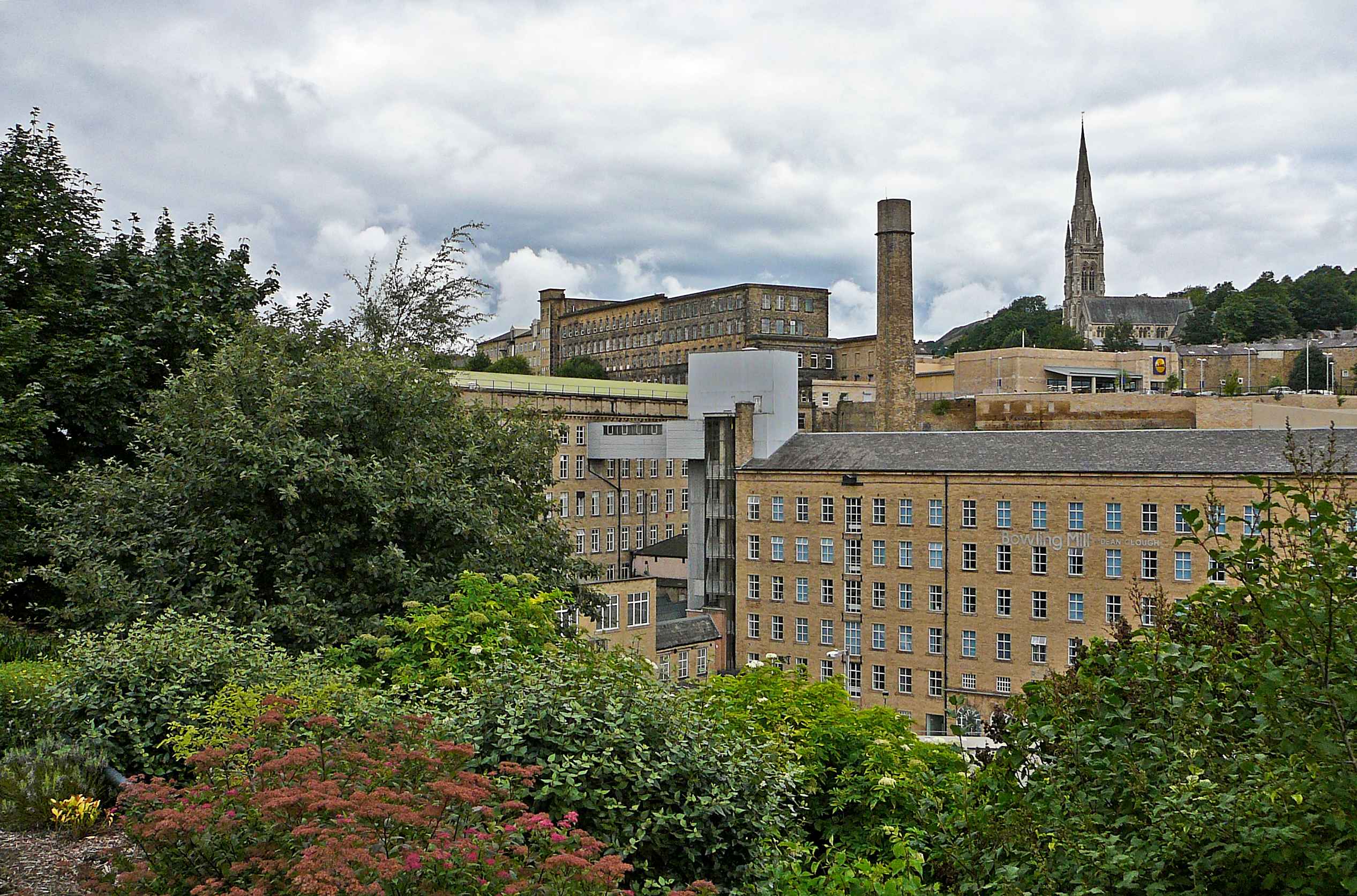
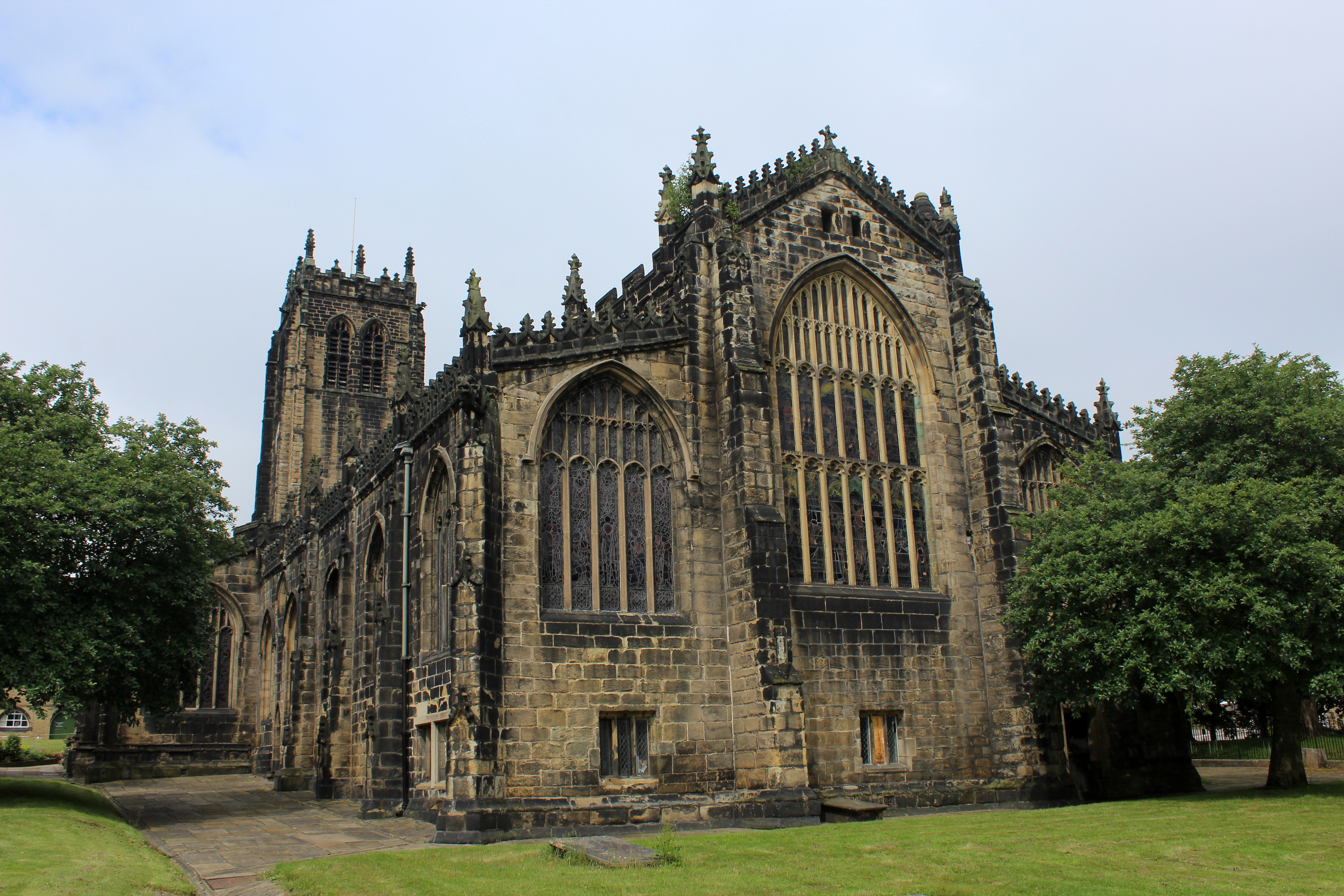
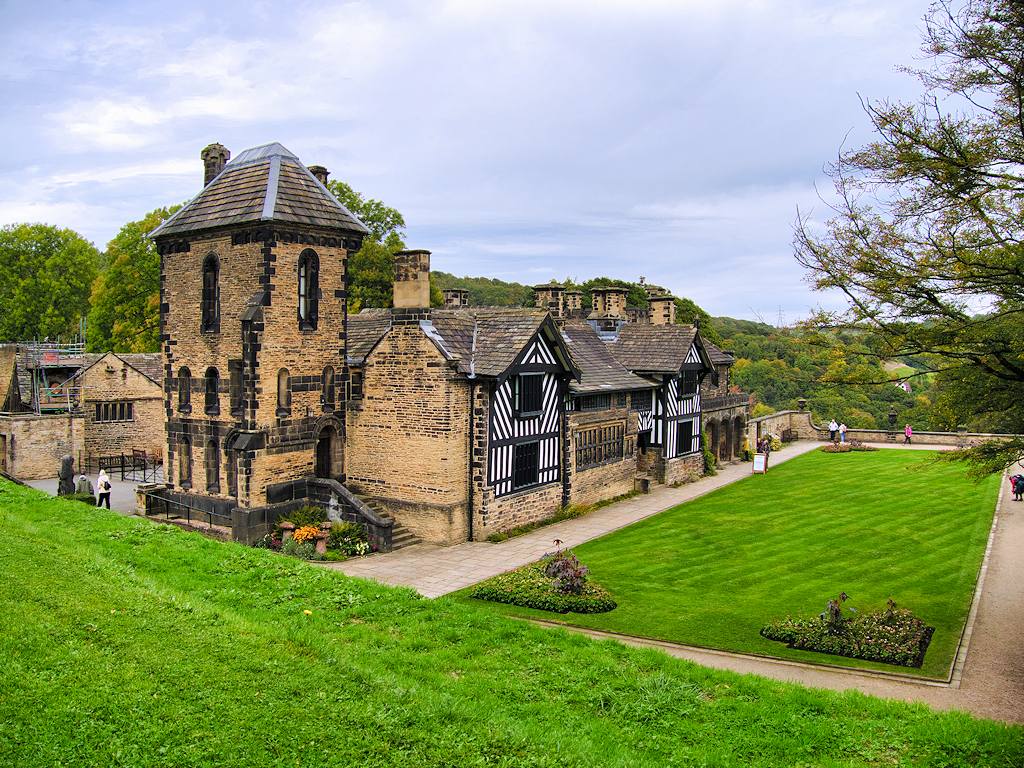
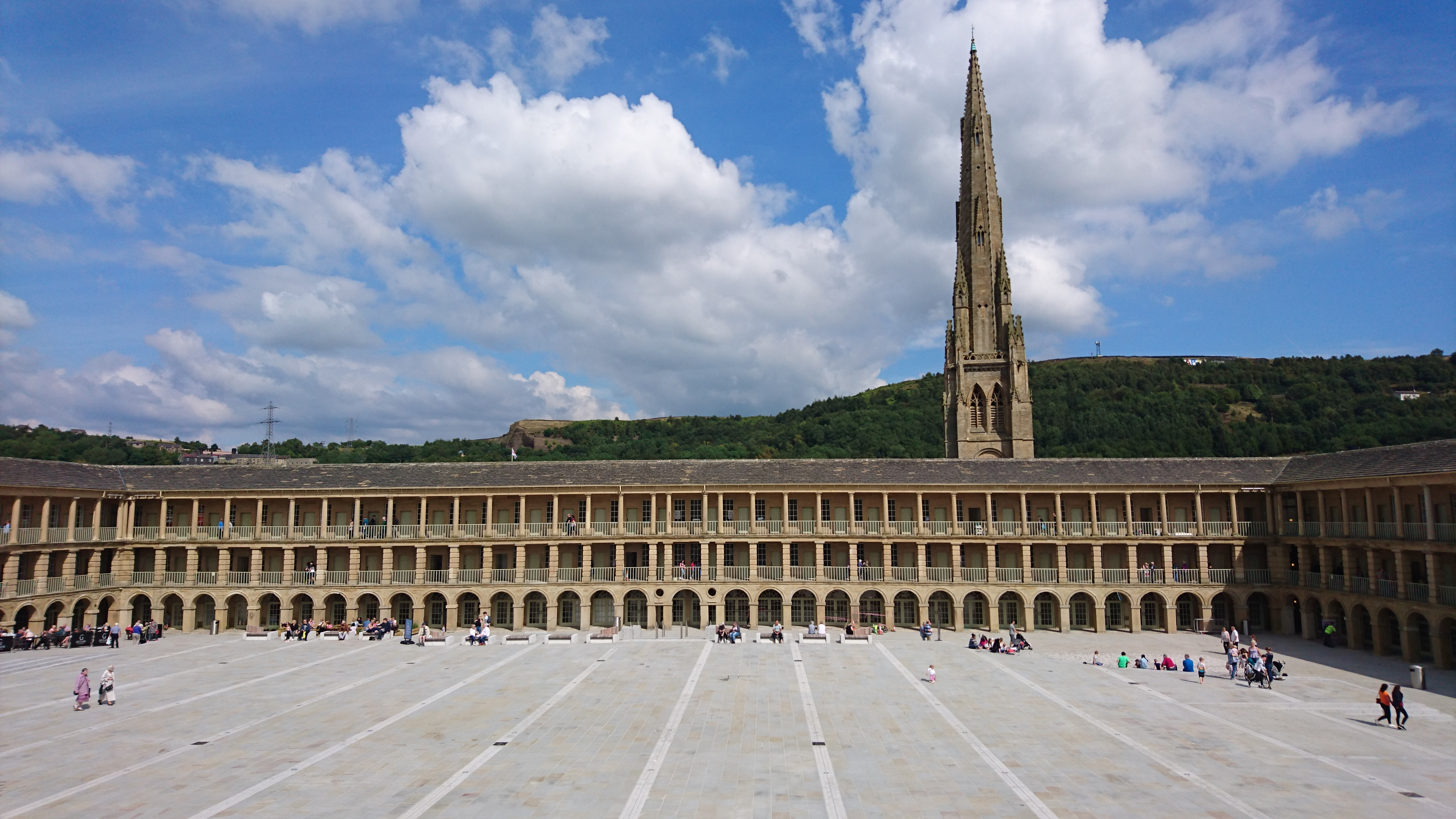
- Halifax's skyline Eureka Museum Dean Clough Mills Minster Shibden Hall Piece Hall

- Coat of arms

- Location within West Yorkshire
- Population: 88,134 (2011 Census)
- Demonym: Haligonian
- OS grid reference: SE090254
  - London: 165 mi (266 km) S
- Metropolitan borough: Calderdale
- Metropolitan county: West Yorkshire
- Region: Yorkshire and the Humber
- Country: England
- Sovereign state: United Kingdom
- Areas of the town: List: Bank Top; Boothtown; Catherine Slack; Copley; Fountainhead; Godley Gardens; Holmfield; Illingworth; Illingworth Moor; Lee Mount; Mixenden (Village); Moor End; Mount Tabor; Norton Tower; Ovenden (Village); Pellon; Savile Park; Shibden; Siddal; Skircoat Green; St. Paul's; Stump Cross; Thrum Hall; Town Centre; Warley Town
- Post town: HALIFAX
- Postcode district: HX1–HX4
- Dialling code: 01422
- Police: West Yorkshire
- Fire: West Yorkshire
- Ambulance: Yorkshire
- UK Parliament: Halifax

Halifax is a town in the Metropolitan Borough of Calderdale, in West Yorkshire, England. It is in the eastern foothills of the Pennines. In the 15th century, the town became an economic hub of the old West Riding of Yorkshire, primarily in woollen manufacture with the large Piece Hall square later built for trading wool in the town centre. The town was a thriving mill town during the Industrial Revolution with the Dean Clough Mill buildings a surviving landmark. In the 2021 census, the town was recorded as having a population of 88,134. It is also the administrative centre of the Calderdale Metropolitan Borough.

== Toponymy ==
The town's name was recorded in about 1091 as Halyfax, most likely from the Old English halh-gefeaxe, meaning "area of coarse grass in the nook of land". This explanation is generally preferred to derivations from the Old English halig (holy), in hālig feax or "holy hair", proposed by 16th-century antiquarians. The probably-incorrect interpretation gave rise to two legends. One concerned a maiden killed by a lustful priest whose advances she spurned; another held that the head of Saint John the Baptist was buried here after his execution.

The legend is almost certainly medieval rather than ancient, although the town's coat of arms carries an image of the saint. Another explanation is a corruption of the Old English hay and ley, as a clearing or meadow. This etymology is based on Haley Hill, the nearby hamlet of Healey (another corruption), and the common occurrence of the surnames Hayley and Haley around Halifax. The derivation from halig has given rise to the demonym Haligonian, which is of recent origin and not in universal use.

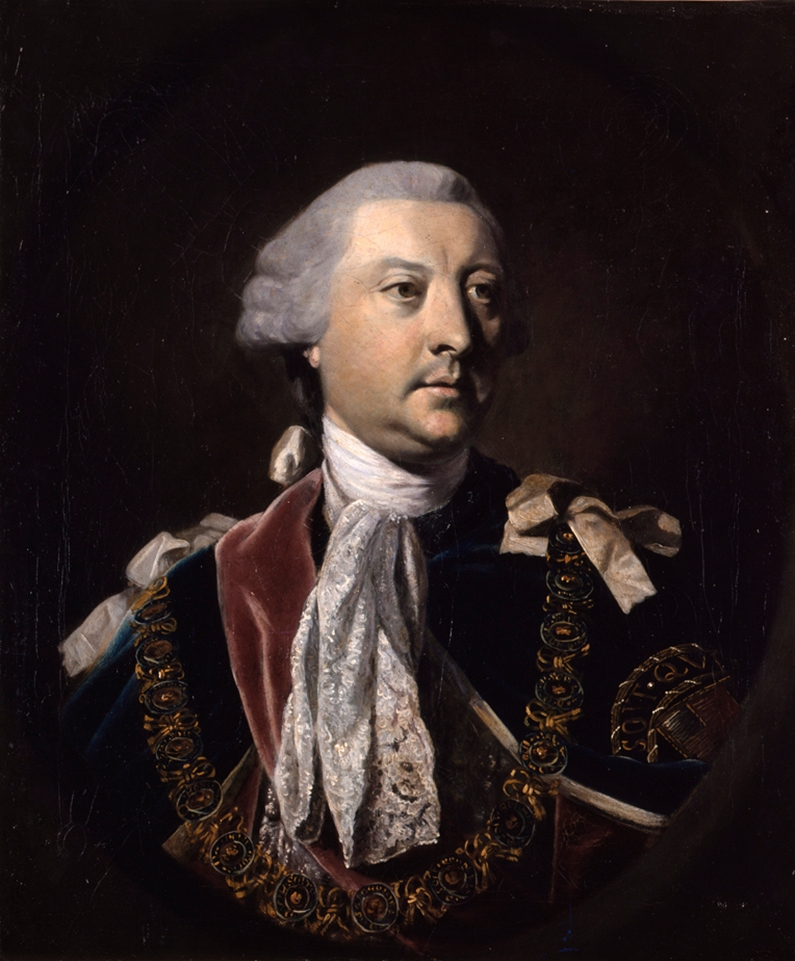
George Montagu-Dunk, 2nd Earl of Halifax

The Earldom of Halifax took the name of the town. Its first creation, in the Peerage of England in 1677, was for George Savile, who was created Baron Savile of Eland and Viscount Halifax in 1668 and later became the Marquess of Halifax (this creation of the earldom became extinct in 1700). George Montagu-Dunk, 2nd Earl of Halifax, (2nd order of the 3rd creation) became the President of the Board of Trade in 1748. In 1749 the city of Halifax, the capital of Nova Scotia, Canada, was named in his honour. The Halifax River in Central Florida, United States, was also named after him.

== History ==
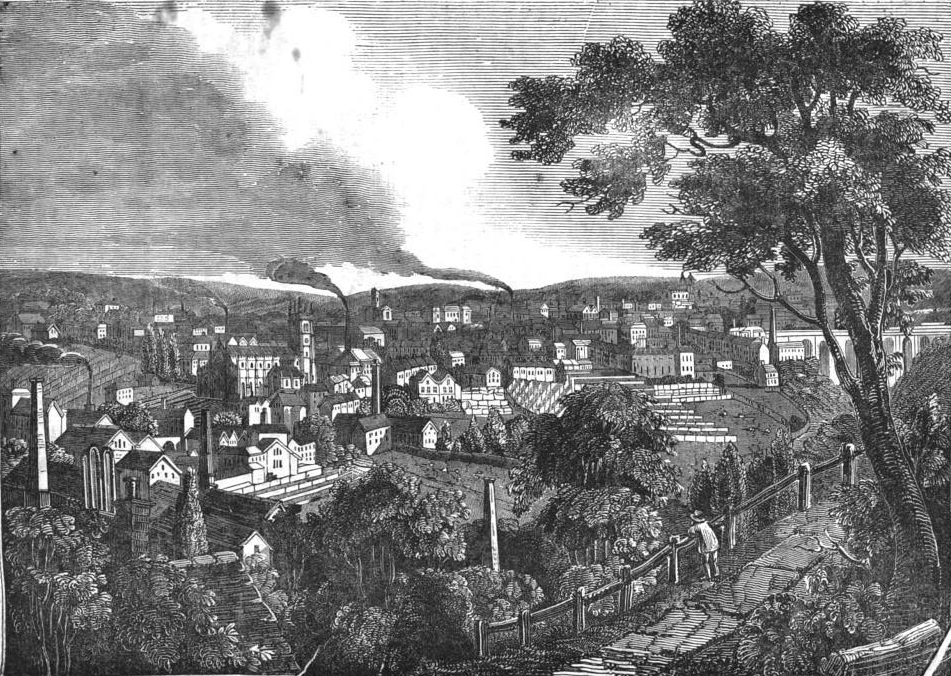
Halifax in 1834

Halifax is not mentioned in the Domesday Book, and evidence of the early settlement is unclear. By the 12th century the township had become the religious centre of the vast parish of Halifax, which extended from Brighouse in the east to Heptonstall in the west. Halifax Minster, parts of which date from the 12th century is dedicated to St John the Baptist. The minster's first organist, in 1766, was William Herschel, who discovered the planet Uranus. The coat of arms of Halifax include the chequers from the original coat of arms of the Earls Warenne, who held the town during Norman times.

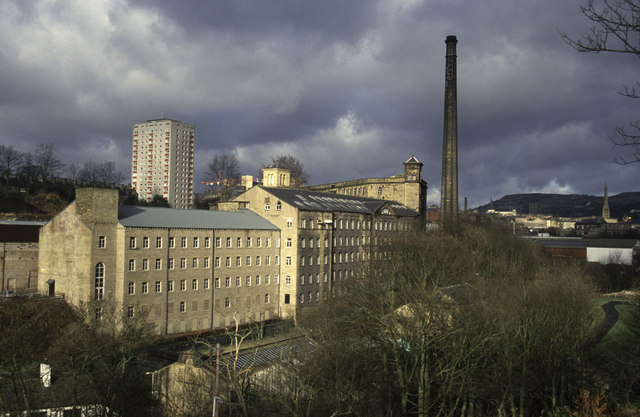
Shaw Lodge Textile Mills

Halifax was notorious for its gibbet, an early form of guillotine used to execute criminals by decapitation, that was last used in 1650. A replica has been erected on the original site in Gibbet Street. Its original blade is on display at Bankfield Museum. Punishment in Halifax was notoriously harsh, as remembered in the Beggar's Litany by poet John Taylor (1580–1654), a prayer whose text included "From Hull, from Halifax, from Hell, 'tis thus, From all these three, Good Lord deliver us.".

The town's 19th-century wealth came from the cotton, wool and carpet industries and like most other Yorkshire towns, it had a large number of weaving mills many of which have been lost or converted to alternative use.

In November 1938, in an incident of mass hysteria, many residents believed a serial killer, the Halifax Slasher, was on the loose. Scotland Yard concluded there were no attacks after several locals admitted they had inflicted wounds on themselves.

Halifax plc started as a building society, the Halifax Permanent Benefit Building and Investment Society, in the town in 1853. Today the bank operates as a trading name of HBOS, part of the Lloyds Banking Group. Yorkshire Bank, based in Leeds and known as the West Riding Penny Savings Bank, was established on 1 May 1859 by Colonel Edward Akroyd of Halifax. Halifax is twinned with Aachen in Germany. The A58 has a stretch called Aachen Way.

== Governance ==
The ancient parish of Halifax was divided into a large number of civil parishes in the 19th century. In Halifax, a body of improvement commissioners or town trustees was created between 1762 and 1823, and the town became a borough constituency under the Reform Act 1832. Halifax was incorporated as a municipal borough in 1848 under the Municipal Corporations Act 1835, and, with the passing of the Local Government Act 1888, became a county borough in 1889. Since 1974, Halifax has been the administrative centre of the Metropolitan Borough of Calderdale in West Yorkshire.

== Geography ==
Topographically, Halifax is located in the south-eastern foothills of the moorland region called the South Pennines. Halifax is situated about 4 miles (6 km) from the M62 motorway, close to Bradford and Huddersfield. The A641 road links the town with Brighouse, Bradford and Huddersfield. The Hebble Brook joins the River Calder at Salterhebble.

== Demography ==
According to the 2021 census, Halifax is majority white, with 73.9% of the population identifying as white, with 70% being White British, 21.7% identify as Asian, 2.1% as Mixed Race, 1% as Black and 1.1% as other. The whitest area of Halifax is Illingworth, with 96.7% of the population identifying as white, Sowerby Bridge is 95% white, Ovenden is 94% white, Siddal/Boothtown is 91.6% white, Skircoat is 74.6% white, Warley is 65.7% white and King Cross is 21.6% white.

As of 2021, 38.9% of the population of Halifax identify as Non Religious, 37.9% identify as Christian, 21.2% identify as Muslim, 1.1% as Hindu, 0.3% as Buddhist, 0.2% as Sikh, and 0.4% as other.

85.8% of people living in Halifax were born in The UK.

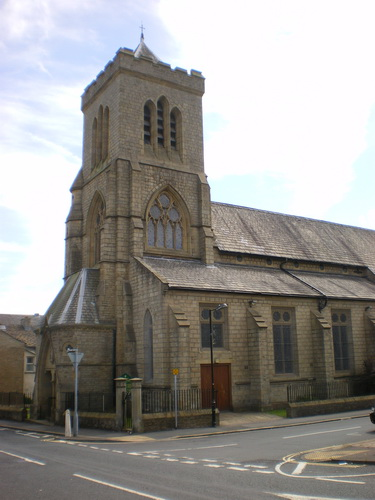
St Mary's Church

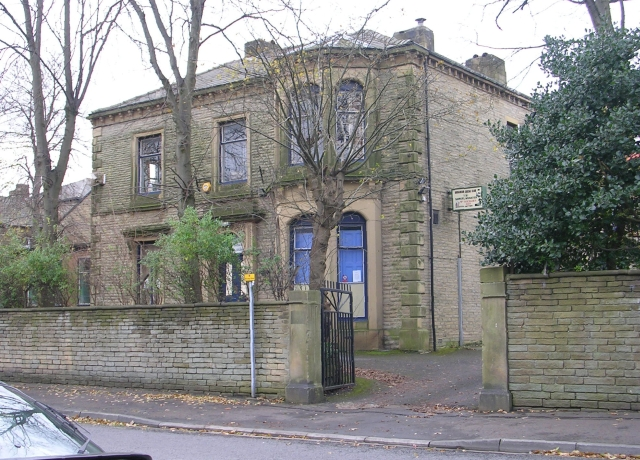
Ukrainian Social Club, Queen's Road

In 2004 Calderdale had a population of 192,405, with 82,500 living in the Halifax urban area. The main ethnic group in Halifax is White (87%), followed by British Pakistani (10%). Over 90% of people aged 16–74 were employed, mostly full-time. 64% of residents had qualifications. Halifax is home to a large South Asian community mainly of British Pakistanis from the Kashmir region, which originally moved to the area for employment in the textile industry.

The majority of the community lives in the west central Halifax region of the town, which was previously home to immigrant Irish communities who have since moved to the outer suburbs. The Illingworth and Mixenden areas, in contrast to west central Halifax, consists mostly of white, Protestant residents. In the 2001 census, 5% stated they were Muslim, 16.3% of no religion, and 63.8% of Christian background. 12.8% did not disclose their religion. The population density of the Halifax urban area is 530/km^{2}.

== Economy ==
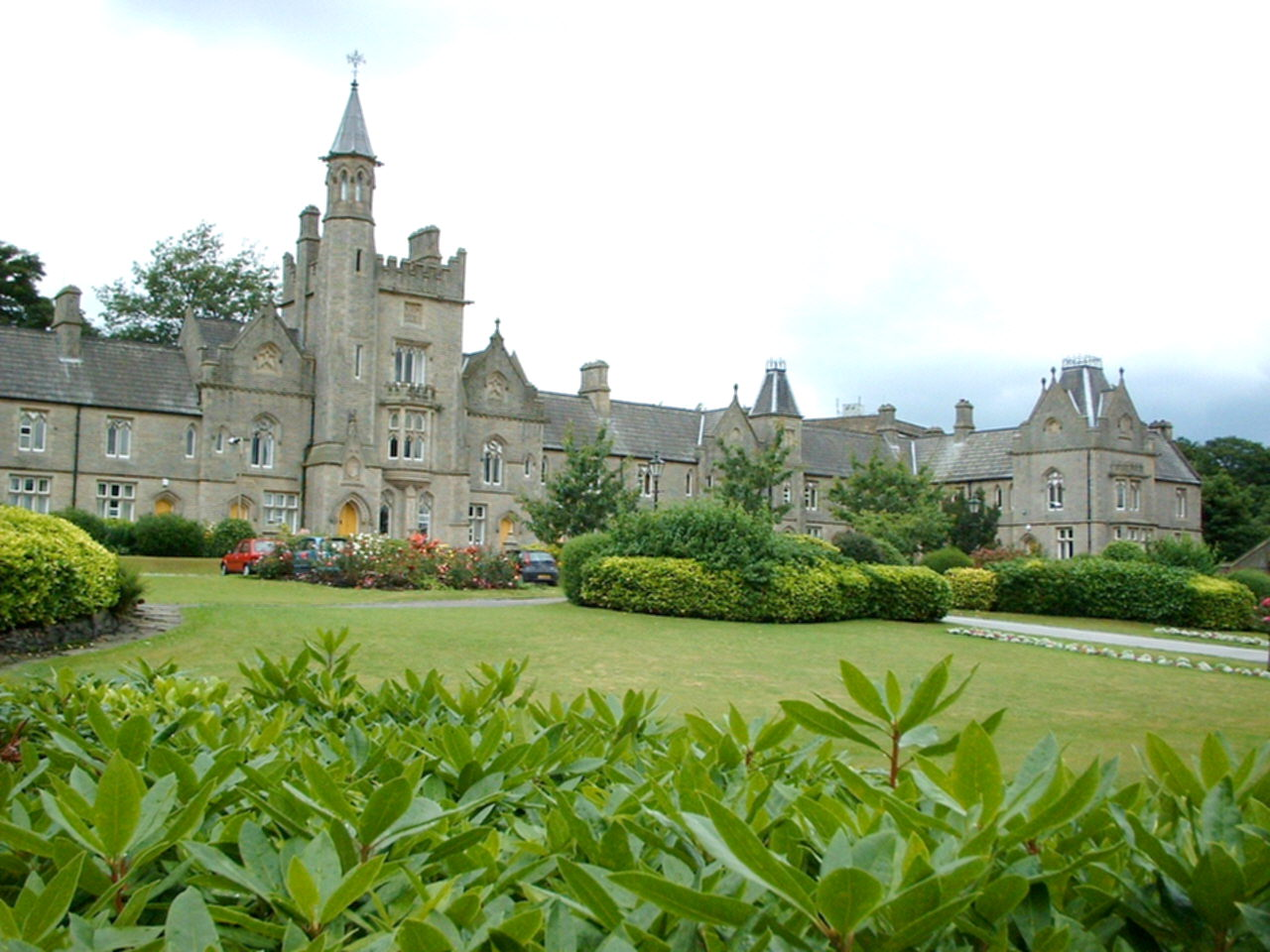
Joseph Crossley's Almshouses

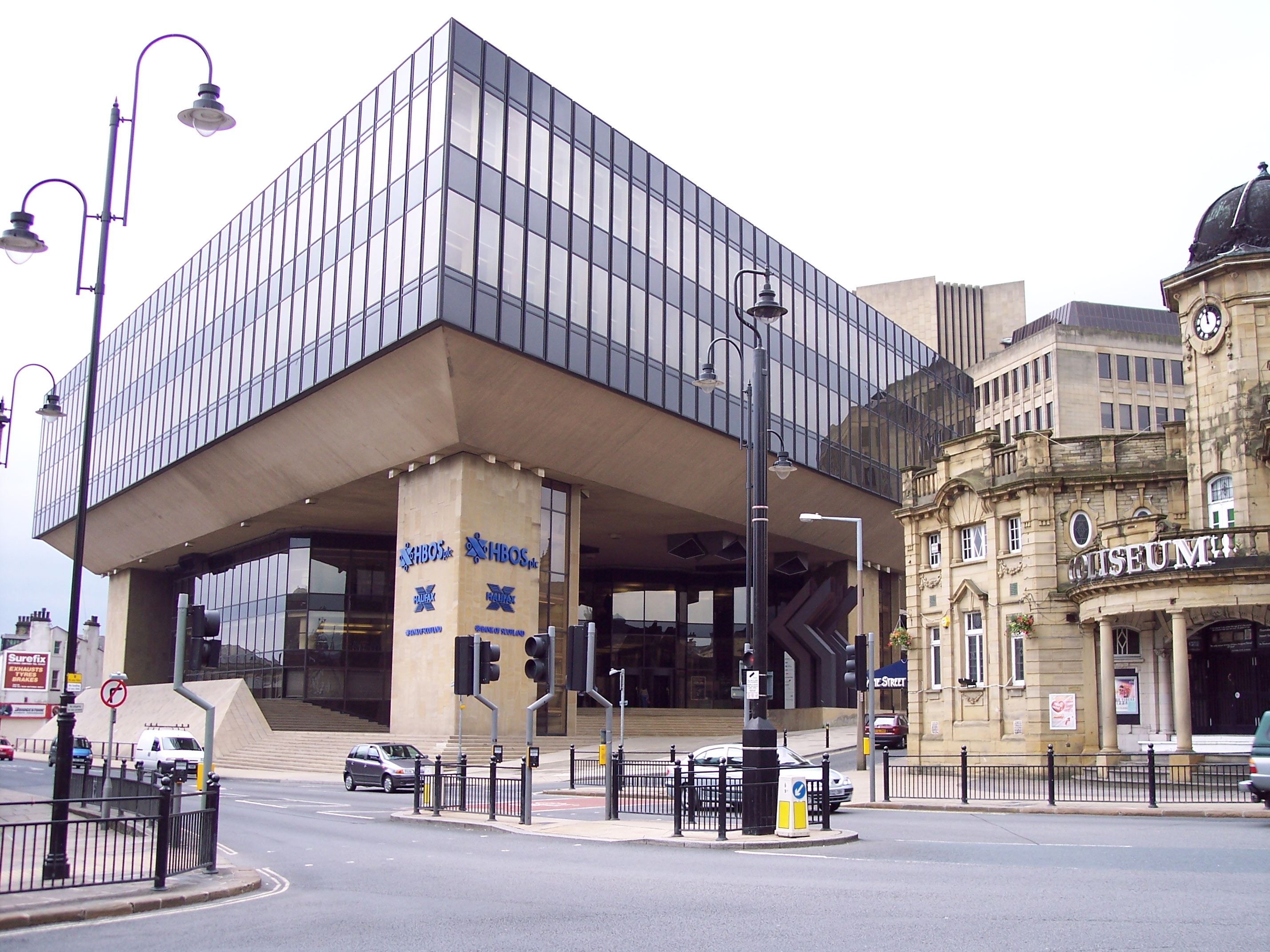
The former Halifax bank headquarters on Trinity Road

From New Year's Day 1779, manufacturers and mercers dealt internationally in such articles through its grandiose square, the Piece Hall. Halifax is known for Mackintosh's chocolate and toffee products, including Rolo and Quality Street. The Halifax bank was founded and has large offices in the town. Dean Clough, north of the town centre, was once one of the largest textile factories in the world at more than 1/2 mile (800 m) long; today the building has been converted for office and retail use including a gym, theatre, Travelodge and radio station.

As well as the significance of the bank Halifax plc which, since 2008, is part of the Lloyds Banking Group, the town has strong associations with confectionery.

John Mackintosh and his wife, Violet, opened a toffee shop in King Cross Lane in 1890. Violet formulated the toffee's recipe. John became known as "The Toffee King". A factory was opened on Queens Road in 1898. A new factory at Albion Mill, at the current site near the railway station, opened in 1909. John died in 1920, and his son Harold continued the business, expanding it to its present size and range of confectionery. Their famous brands, including Rolo, Toffee Crisp and Quality Street of chocolate and confectionery have global popularity.

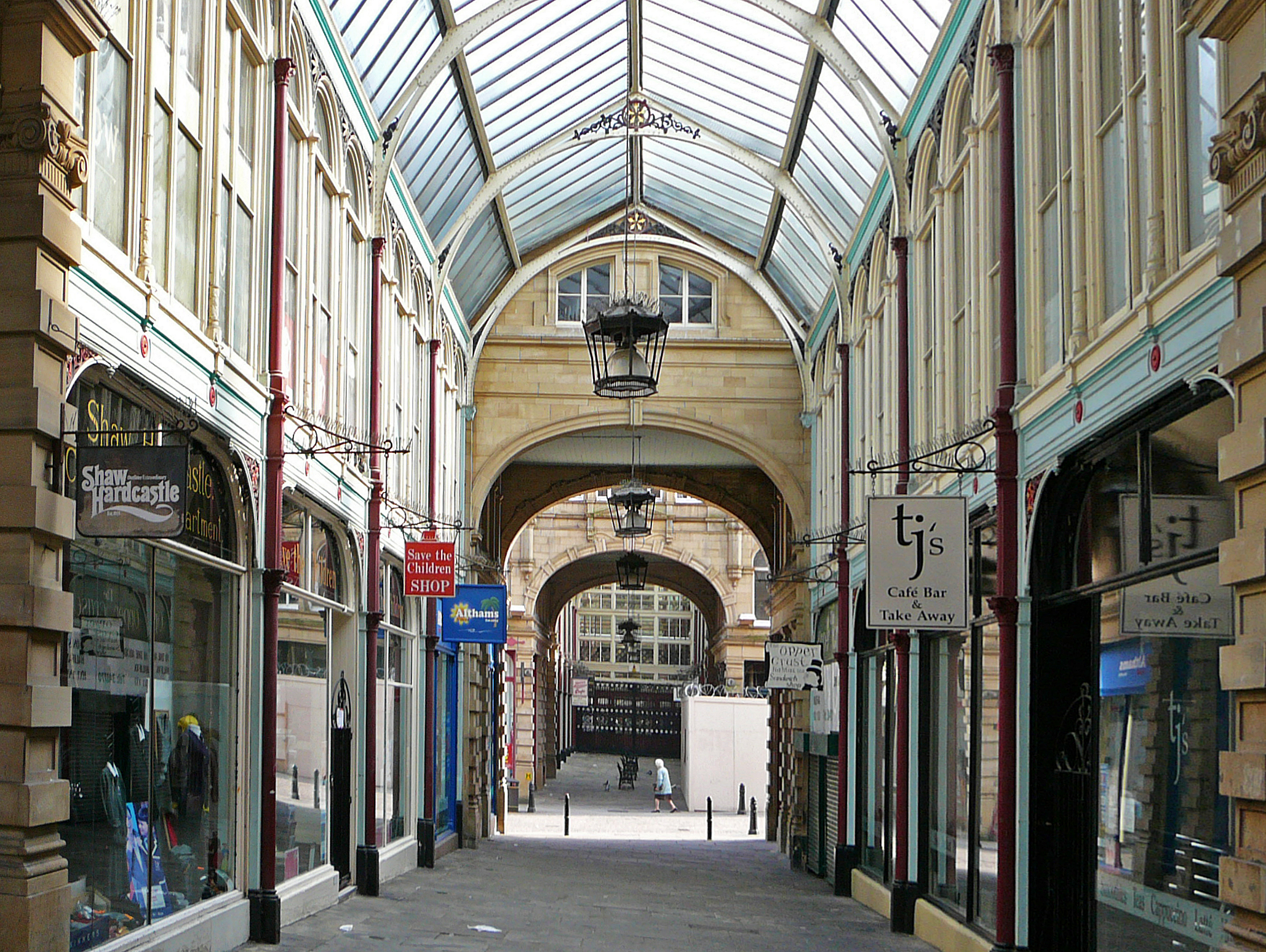
Shopping Arcade

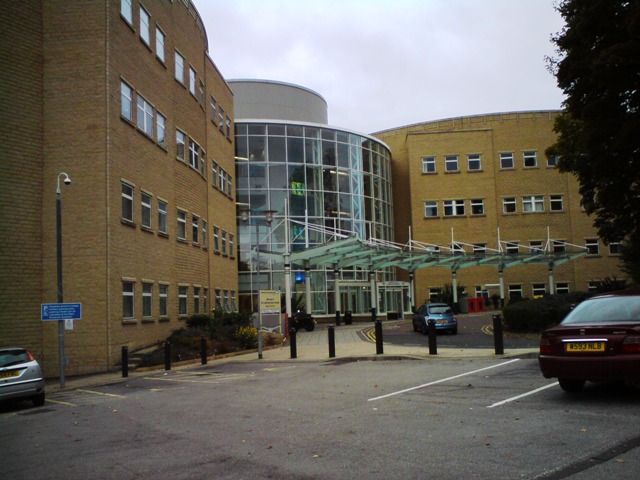
The Calderdale Royal Hospital

In 1969 John Mackintosh & Co Limited merged with the York-based Rowntree Limited to form Rowntree Mackintosh. This was, in turn, purchased by Nestlé in 1988. Riley's Toffee Rolls were launched in 1907, made by "Riley Brothers".

Halifax was a busy industrial town, dealing in and producing wool, carpets, machine tools and beer. The Crossley family began carpet manufacture in modest premises at Dean Clough, on the banks of Hebble Brook. The family was philanthropic and Joseph and Sir Francis Crossley built and endowed almshouses for their workers, which exist to this day and are run by volunteer trustees. Halifax is also home to Suma Wholefoods, which was established in 1975 and is the largest workers' co-operative in the UK.

== Transport ==
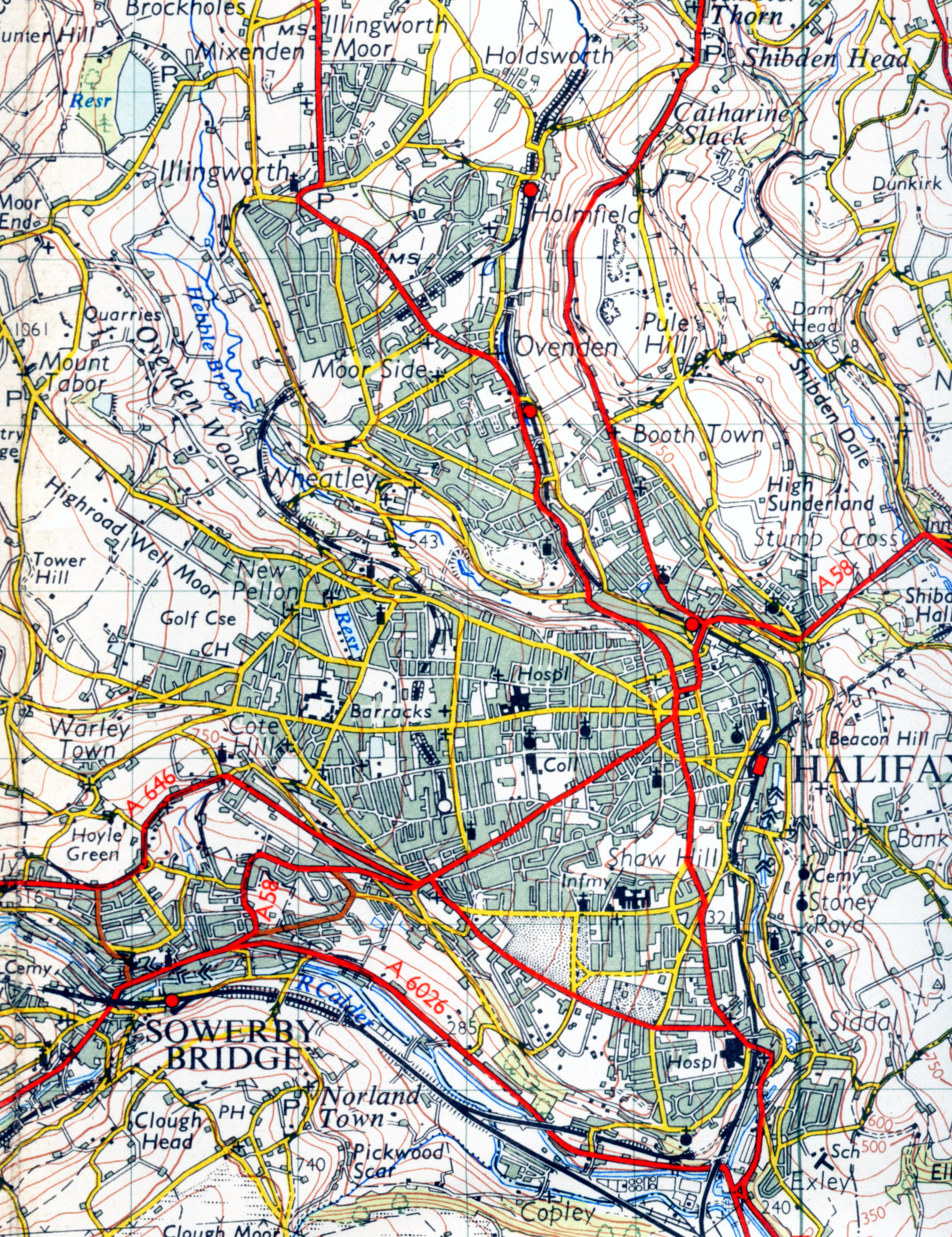
A map of Halifax from 1954

Public bus and train transportation in Halifax is managed and subsidised by West Yorkshire Metro. It was announced in January 2009 that Halifax was to have a direct rail link to London after a long campaign backed by many, including the local paper the Courier; the service began to run on 23 May 2010.

=== Bus ===
Most of the bus services operate from Halifax bus station. First West Yorkshire operate most services in the town, Team Pennine, part of the Transdev Blazefield group operating a small number of routes. Arriva Yorkshire currently operate the 255 Leeds to Halifax route. First operate bus services from Halifax to Huddersfield, Bradford and Leeds. First also run services into other counties, Rochdale in Greater Manchester and Burnley in Lancashire.

=== Rail ===
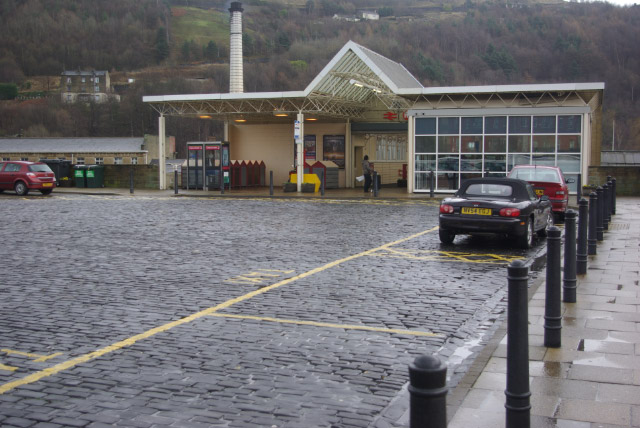
Halifax railway station

Halifax railway station is on the Calder Valley line, with services to Manchester Victoria, York, Selby via Bradford Interchange and Leeds; Blackpool North; via Brighouse to Huddersfield and Wakefield Westgate and to London King's Cross via Wakefield Kirkgate. The London service is operated by Grand Central, the others by Northern Trains.

Rail passenger representation is organised by the local users' group, the Halifax and District Rail Action Group (HADRAG).

The railway leading from Halifax due north towards Keighley (towards Skipton, Morecambe and Carlisle) with a further branch to Bradford via Queensbury saw its last through services in May 1955, although parts of the route, which was extremely heavily engineered with long tunnels and high, spectacular viaducts, have now been repaired and revived by Sustrans as a walking and cycle route. In 2018 a campaign was launched to save and restore the 2,501 yards (2,287 m) Queensbury Tunnel and add it to the walking and cycling network. A branch from Holmfield, on the Halifax to Queensbury section of the lines to Keighley and Bradford, served the west side of Halifax. It terminated at St. Paul's. This short branch closed to passengers in January 1927 and to all traffic in June 1960.

Halifax is also served by Sowerby Bridge station in the neighbouring town of Sowerby Bridge at the southwest edge of the town. It lies just to the south of the River Calder.

== Media ==
Calderdale's local radio stations are BBC Radio Leeds on 95.3 FM, Hits Radio West Yorkshire on 102.5 FM, Heart Yorkshire on 106.2 FM, Capital Yorkshire on 105.1 FM and Phoenix Radio on 96.7 FM, which has its studios in Halifax.

Sunrise Radio (Yorkshire) has been given permission by media regulator Ofcom to expand its FM coverage to Halifax.

Local news and television programmes are provided by BBC Yorkshire and ITV Yorkshire. Television signals are received from the Emley Moor TV transmitter and the local relay transmitter.

The Halifax Courier, Calderdale's local weekly newspaper, has its offices in the town.

== Education ==
The Halifax area is home to two selective and non fee-paying grammar schools, which are the Crossley Heath School in Savile Park and North Halifax Grammar School in Illingworth. Both schools achieve excellent GCSE and A level results with both schools achieving a large proportion of A*to C grades at GCSE level. In 2005, the Crossley Heath School was the highest ranking co-educational school in the North of England.

Calderdale College is a further education college located on Francis Street, just off King Cross Road, in the west of the town. The Maltings College opened in 2013 and offers a range of vocational sixth form courses.

In December 2006 it was announced that Calderdale College, in partnership with Leeds Beckett University, opened a new higher education institution in January 2007 called 'University Centre Calderdale'.

In 2019, Trinity Sixth Form opened in Halifax town centre, which provides 'outstanding' further education for pupils aged between 16 and 18. The school formed as a result of the closure of sixth forms within schools in the Trinity MAT. This allowed for a more 16-18 friendly education to be sought by pupils from the Trinity schools. This school, as with the above school, boasts excellent A-level results, with a consistently >98% pass rate since opening in 2019, as well as almost 200% growth in student numbers in that time.

== Culture ==
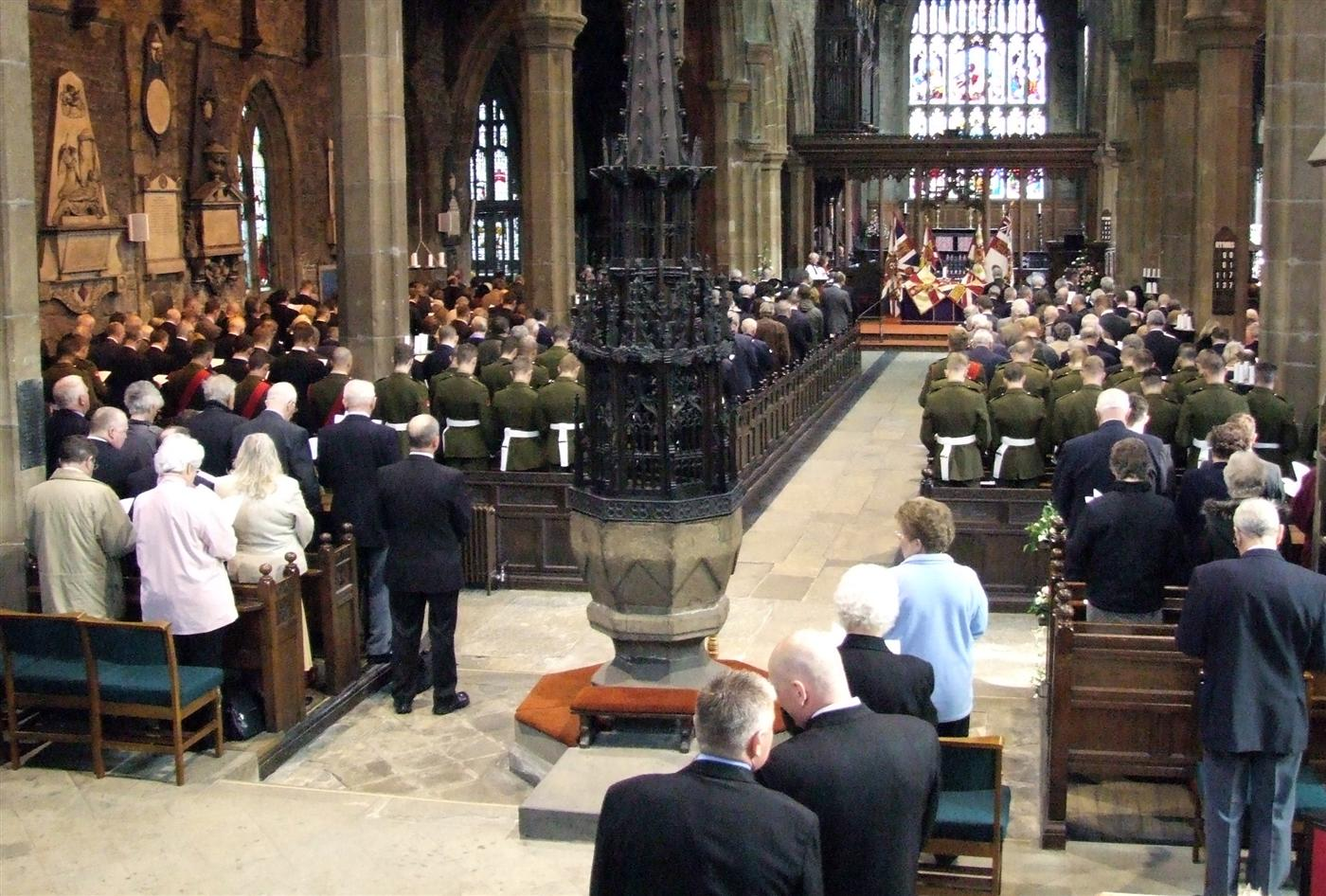
Laying up of 1981 stand of Regimental Colours of the 1st Battalion Duke of Wellington's Regiment in Halifax Minster

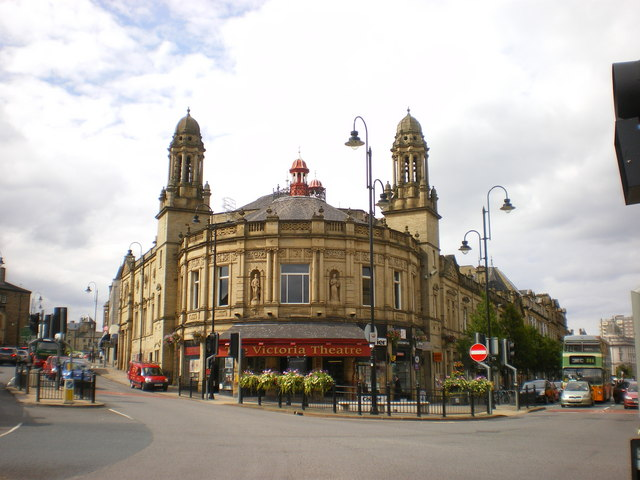
Victoria Theatre, Halifax

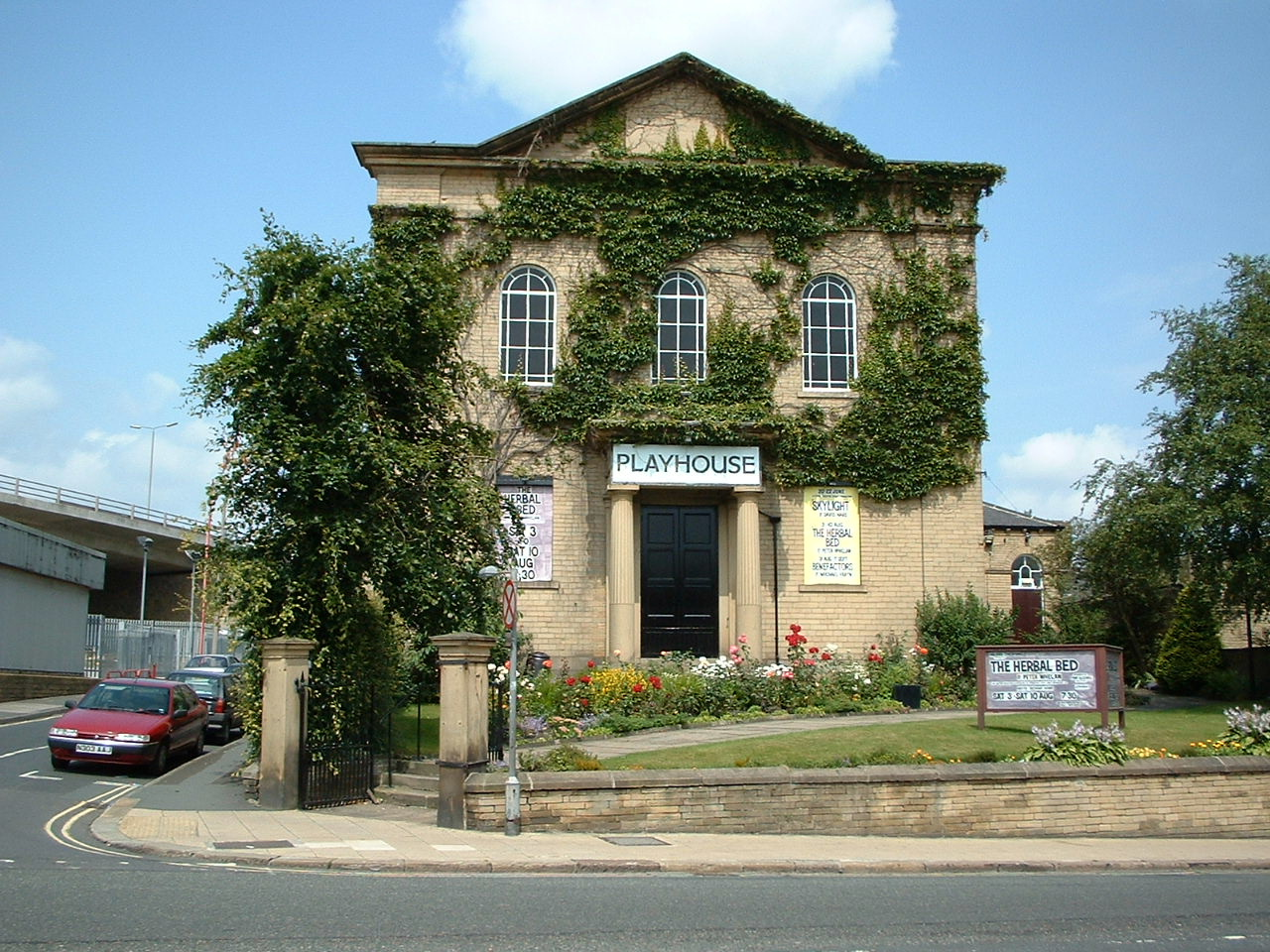
The Playhouse, Halifax

The Duke of Wellington's Regiment (West Riding) Regimental Association, previously based at Wellesley Park, on the junction of Gibbet Street and Spring Hall Road, in the former Wellesley Barracks is located within the Bankfield Museum on Boothtown Road. The former barracks, having served as the headquarters of the schools' music service in the last few decades of the 20th century, became a school in 2005.

Former regimental colours of the 'Duke's' are laid up in the Halifax Minster. These include the stand used by the 33rd Regiment between 1761 and 1771, which is one of the oldest in existence in England, plus those carried by the regiment during the Battle of Waterloo and the Crimea. The 1981 stand of colours, was taken out of service in 2002. They were marched through the town from the town hall to the minster, which at that time was still a parish church, accompanied by two escorts of 40 troops, the Regimental Drums and the Heavy Cavalry and Cambrai Band on Sunday 31 March 2007. The troops were then inspected by the Lord Lieutenant of West Yorkshire, Dame Ingrid Roscoe DCVO DStJ FSA and the Mayor of Halifax Cllr Colin Stout making a total of eight stands of colours within the Regimental Chapel. The regiment was presented with the "Freedom of Halifax" on 18 June 1945.

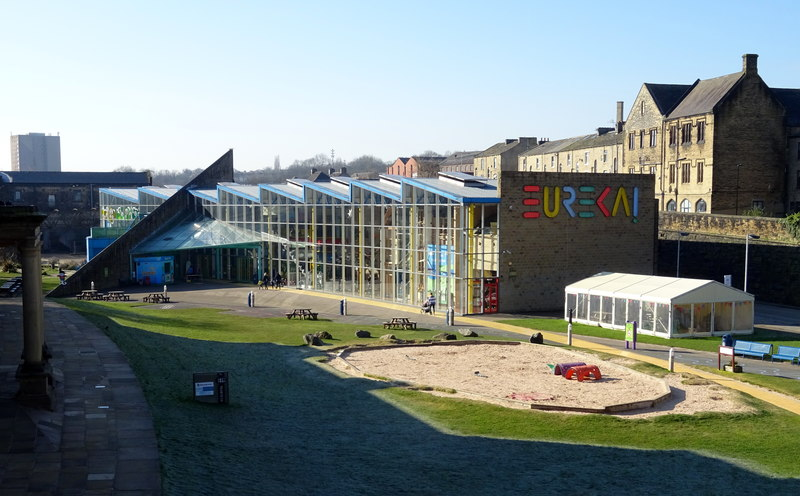
Eureka! The National Children's Museum

Eureka! The National Children's Museum was inspired and opened by King Charles III when he was Prince of Wales and Duke of Cornwall in the summer of 1992 and is in part of the railway station.

Another cultural aspect of the town is its nightlife, centred around Georges Square and Bull Green. It is also home to Britain's oldest nightclub The Acapulco that opened in the early 1960s. The nightclub auctioned off its infamous 20-odd-year old grubby carpet, in square pieces, and surprisingly raised thousands of pounds.

=== Dean Clough Mill ===
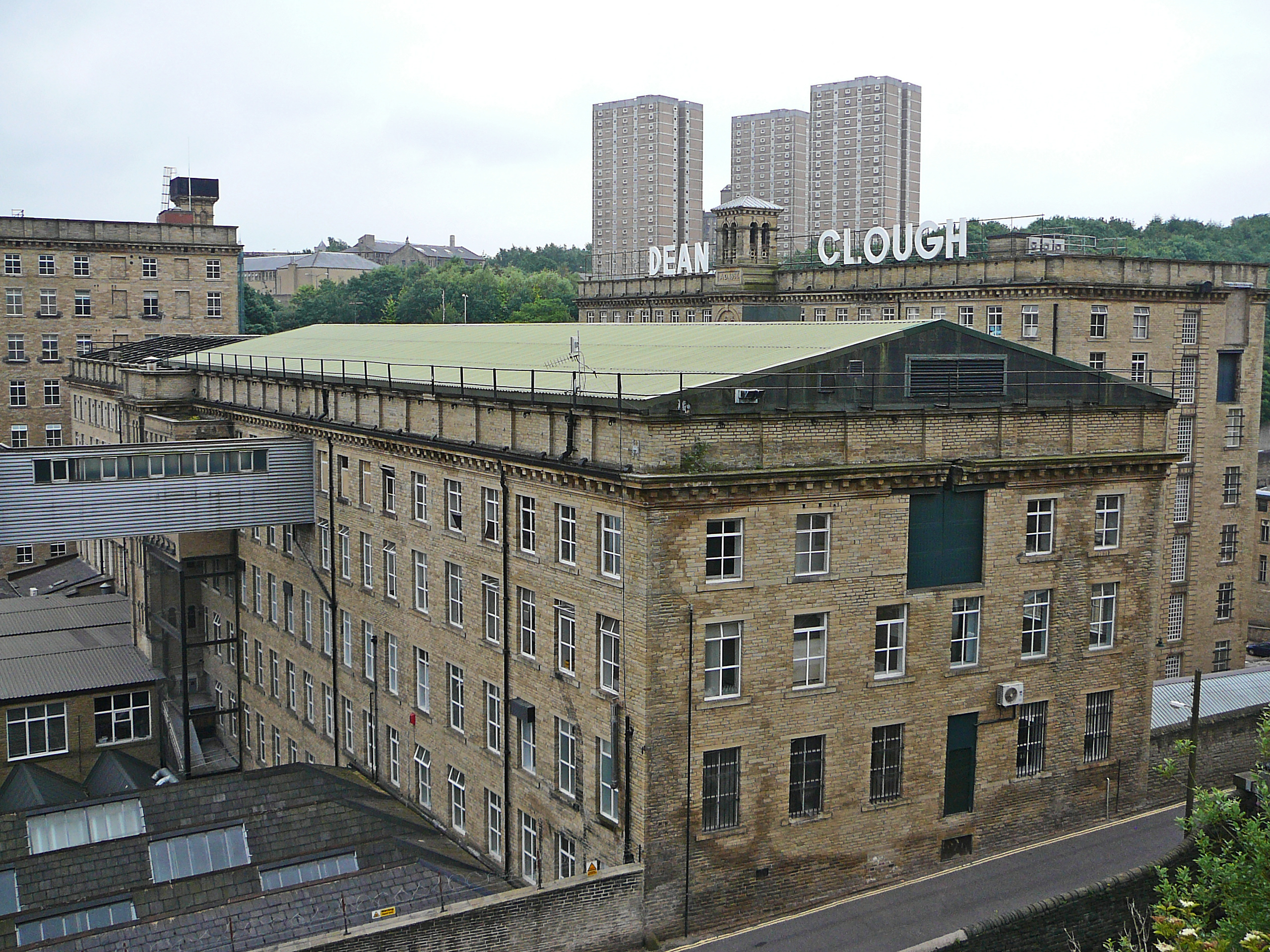
Dean Clough Textile Mills

Dean Clough Mill, a redeveloped worsted spinning mill, was once the largest carpet factory in the world. It was built in the 1840s–'60s for Crossley's Carpets and owned by John Crossley. The corona chimney dominates over the mill complex and area, at a height of 297-foot (91 m), it is made from triangular cast iron plates and built in 1857.

It was converted into a business park in the 1980s by Sir Ernest Hall. It was redeveloped again to host the Northern Broadsides Theatre Company and the IOU theatre company as well as providing space for eight art galleries. The Artworks is a collection of artists studios, gallery space and an art school housed in an old mill complex just to the south of the town centre.

The structure can be seen entering the town from the north and east and lower parts of Pellon. It would have been one of many that filled the Halifax skyline back in the Victorian age. There is also a smaller chimney that has been shortened, which is not much higher than the existing mills surrounding it.

== Landmarks ==
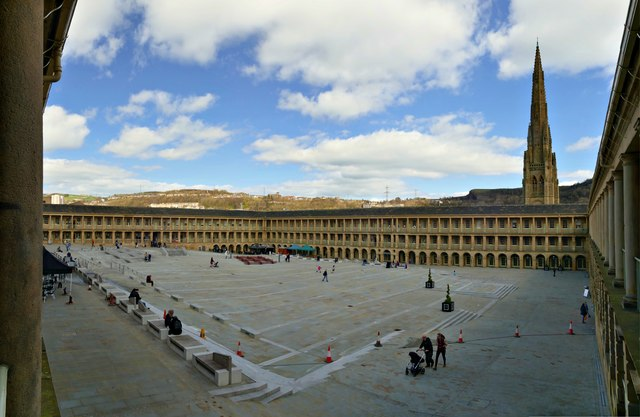
Piece Hall

- Piece Hall is the former cloth hall, where pieces of woollen cloth were traded. Opened on 1 January 1779, trading took place for two hours on a Saturday morning in a total of 315 merchant trading rooms. After the mechanisation of the cloth industry, the Piece Hall became a public market. Piece Hall is host to many arts, crafts and independent shops. The Piece Hall has recently undergone a £19 million conservation and transformation programme. The works were completed in July 2017, after a three-year construction plan which overran by a year and over budget, with the building fully reopened in August (on Yorkshire day) with shops, cafes and events run by the Piece Hall Charity. The hall is also home to the industrial museum.
- Halifax Minster
- Halifax Town Hall was designed by Charles Barry, who also designed the Houses of Parliament, in 1863.

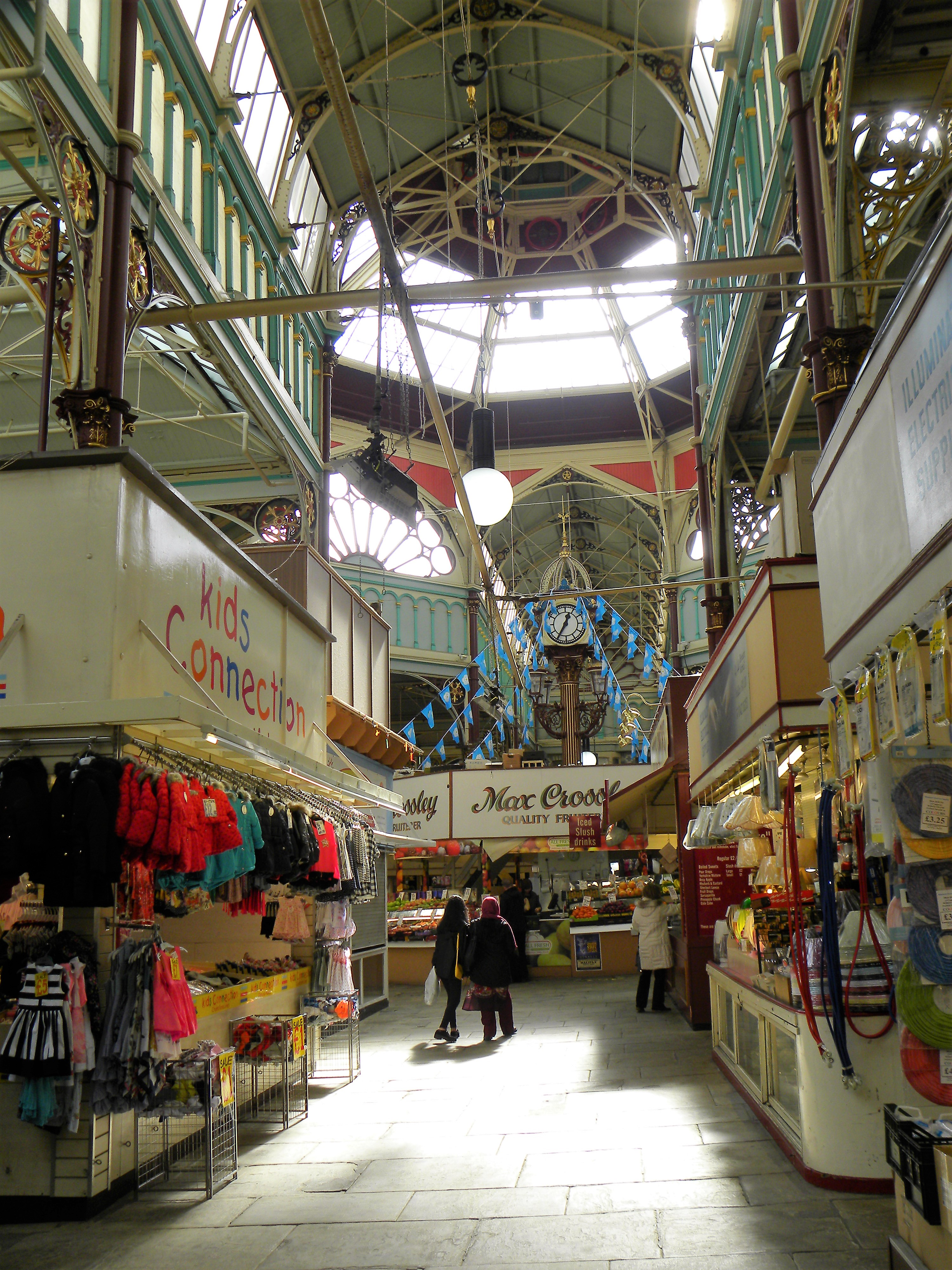
Borough Market

- Borough Market is a Victorian covered market-place in the town centre. A hidden gem with streets on top of the building that housed market workers at one time. It is (2024) currently undergoing a major refurbishment.
- Wainhouse Tower, at King Cross, is a late Victorian folly constructed between 1871 and 1875. Originally intended to be the chimney for a dye works, it became a folly after the dye works was sold in 1874 and the new owner refused to pay for its completion. It is the tallest folly in the world and the tallest structure in Calderdale. It is open to the public on bank holidays weather permitting.
- People's Park is a public park originally designed by Joseph Paxton, given to the people of Halifax in 1857 by Sir Francis Crossley.
- The Prescott Street drill hall designed by Richard Coad and completed in 1870.

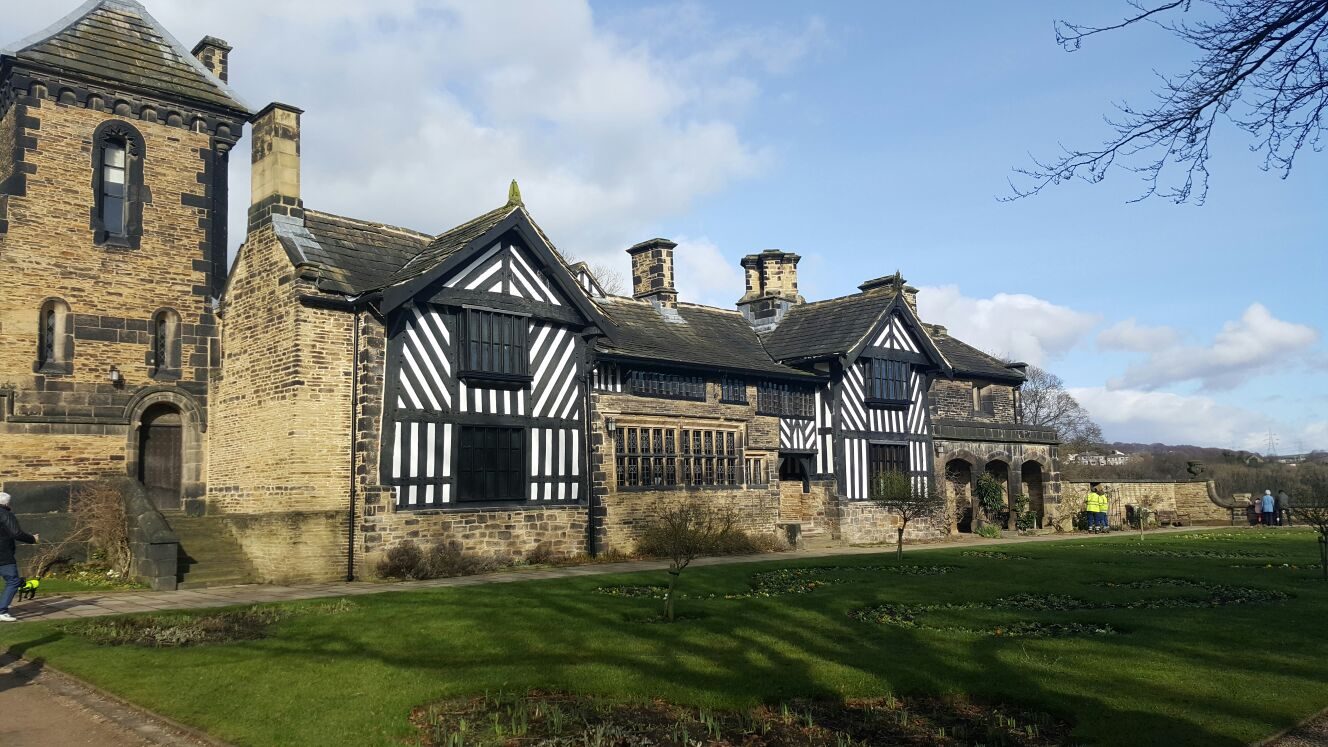
Shibden Hall

- Shibden Hall is just outside Halifax in the neighbouring Shibden Valley, it was once the diarist Anne Lister's home.
- The Magna Via, an ancient footpath from Wakefield to Halifax. Sections are visible in the Shibden Valley area.
- North Bridge, Victorian era bridge in the Gothic Revival style

== Sport ==
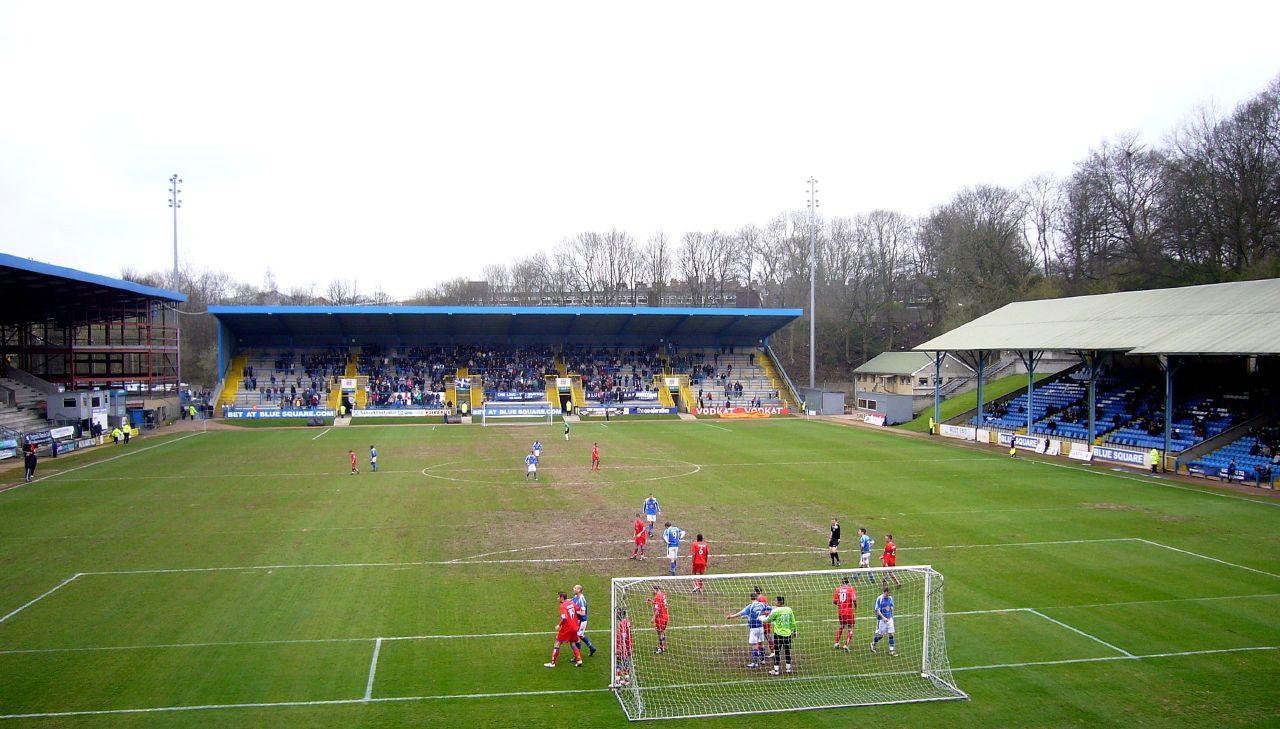
The Shay, the town's football and rugby league stadium.

The town has relatively successful sports clubs. Its rugby league club, Halifax Panthers, plays in the Betfred Championship. The town's football team, FC Halifax Town currently compete in the National League, the fifth tier of English football. Halifax also has a women's football team, Halifax FC Women.

=== Football ===
The Shay football ground has been the home of the town's football club since 1921. The ground was substantially redeveloped in the late 20th and early 21st centuries, with money provided by the Football Foundation and funds raised or provided by the local community and Calderdale Council.

=== Rugby league ===
Halifax Panthers is one of the most historic rugby league clubs in the game, formed over a century ago, in 1873. They have been Champions of England on 4 occasions and have lifted the Challenge Cup five times. Amateur clubs Boothtown Terriers, Greetland All Rounders, Illingworth, King Cross Park, Ovenden, Siddal and Stainland Stags are based in or near the town. The Siddal club is a leading member of amateur rugby league's flagship National Conference League. Greetland All Rounders and Ovenden are former members.

=== Rugby union ===
Halifax has several senior rugby union clubs. They include Halifax, Halifax Vandals (Warley), Heath (West Vale), Old Crossleyans, Old Rishworthians (Copley) and Old Brodleians (Hipperholme).

=== Field hockey ===
Halifax Hockey Club is a field hockey club that competes in the North Hockey League and the Yorkshire & North East League.

=== Speedway ===
Motorcycle speedway racing has been staged at two venues in Halifax. In the pioneering days of 1928–1930 a track operated at Thrum Hall. A Halifax team took part in the English Dirt Track League of 1929. Speedway returned to Halifax at the Shay Stadium in 1949 and operated until 1951. The team operated as the Halifax Nomads in 1948 racing three away fixtures. The Halifax Dukes, the name they took once the Shay was opened, operated in the National League Third Division in 1949 before moving up to the Second Division in 1950. Riders including Arthur Forrest, moved on to Bradford. The Dukes re-emerged in 1965 as founder members of the British League and operated there for many years before the team moved en bloc to Odsal Stadium, Bradford.

=== Swimming ===
Halifax Swimming Pool was opened in 1966 and designed by the borough architects FH Hoyles and JL Berbiers. It contains two ceramic murals by Kenneth Barden on the theme of British pond life. By 2020 there was consideration that a new swimming pool should be installed within the existing North Bridge Leisure Centre, and that the current building should be listed as a significant twentieth-century building. Demolition is currently underway and the entire building (including Barden's two murals) is likely to have disappeared by the end of 2026.

== Religion ==
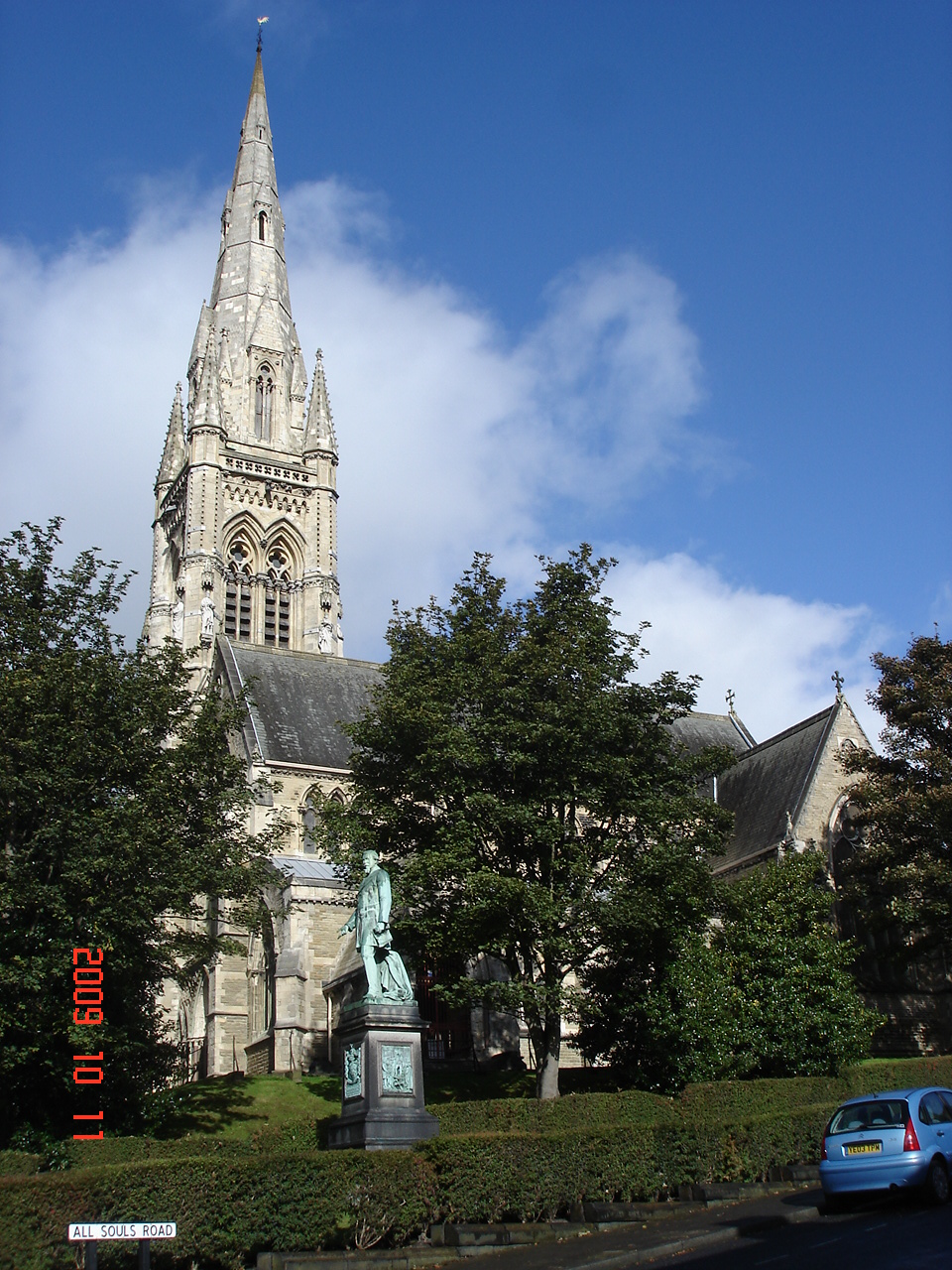
All Souls' Church and a statue of Edward Akroyd

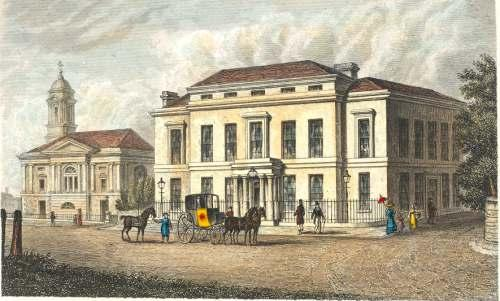
The Assembly Rooms and Trinity Church in Halifax from A Complete History of the County of York by Thomas Allen (1828–30)

The 15th-century Minster is dedicated to John the Baptist. The church did not achieve cathedral status when a new diocese was being considered for the West Riding: Wakefield parish church became the cathedral in 1888 and was extensively altered and enlarged. Minster status was only conferred on the parish church in a ceremony on 22 November 2009. There is a collection of rare Commonwealth white glass as well as a series of Victorian windows. Another feature is the complete array of Jacobean box pews. The pair of Gothic organ cases by John Oldrid Scott now house the four-manual instrument last rebuilt in 1929 by Harrison & Harrison. The tower holds fourteen bells and an Angelus.

St Mary's Roman Catholic Church, on the corner of Gibbet Street and Clarence Street, was built in 1839, rebuilt in 1864 and extended in 1924. St. Alban's church, on Huddersfield Road, forms part of the same parish as St Mary's.

The Serbian Orthodox Church, dedicated to St. John the Baptist, in the Boothtown area, formerly the Mount Carmel Methodist chapel, was acquired in 1956 and after extensive refurbishment was opened in the 1965 by the town's Serbian community. In 2015 the church celebrated its Golden Jubilee.

The mid-Victorian All Souls' Church by Sir George Gilbert Scott, standing part way up Haley Hill to the north of the main town centre, is redundant and vested in the Churches Conservation Trust. It is grade I listed and is open to visitors at limited times. Its lofty 236-foot (72 m) spire and white magnesian limestone exterior stand as a very personal statement in 13th-century French style of the mill owner Lieutenant Colonel Edward Akroyd, who paid solely for its construction as the centre-piece of a purpose-built model village "Akroydon".

All Souls' has an unusually complete sequence of windows by the leading artists of the 1850s, including William Wailes, John Hardman and Clayton and Bell. The large organ by Forster and Andrews, inserted in 1868, ten years after the building was completed, is currently unplayable and many of its surviving parts are in storage awaiting restoration. The tower houses a ring of eight bells.

Other churches include the Georgian Holy Trinity Church (which has since now been converted to office use) and the late Gothic Revival (1911) St. Paul's at King Cross, by Arts and Crafts architect Sir Charles Nicholson. St. Paul's is notable not only for its fine acoustics and massive west tower but also for an unusual and highly colourful west window by Hugh Easton, specified by Nicholson, showing the apocalyptic vision of the Holy City descending upon the smoky mills and railway viaducts of Halifax as it was before World War I.

The Church of St Jude in Savile Park, designed by local architect William Swinden Barber in 1888, is easily identified by the four large pinnacles on its tower. There is also a more modern Christadelphian church, located on Balmoral Place. As of early 2024 a new Jehovah's Witnesses Kingdom Hall was under construction on Crown Road in Boothtown to replace the smaller hall located on Shay Lane in Ovenden.

== Notable people ==
- Christina Pickles, actress
- Ed Sheeran, singer-songwriter
- Tom Bailey, singer of the Thompson Twins
- William Swinden Barber, architect
- Richard Bedford, singer
- Phyllis Bentley, novelist
- James Bintliff, Union Army General
- Sarah Blackwood, singer
- Harry "Hbomberguy" Brewis, leftist internet personality
- Bramwell Booth, former Salvation Army General
- Christopher Saint Booth, filmmaker and composer
- Philip Adrian Booth, filmmaker and composer
- Henry Briggs, mathematician
- Jacob Brown, footballer
- Kenny Carter, Speedway Rider. British Champion 1984 1985. World Pairs champion 1983
- Alan Carter, Road racer 250cc. Youngest ever winner of a Grand Prix. Le Mans (1983)
- John Reginald Halliday Christie, the murderer from 10 Rillington Place
- Lindsay Clarke, novelist
- Keith Clifford, actor, in Last of the Summer Wine and Coronation Street
- Hannah Cockroft, athlete/double Paralympic gold medallist
- Shirley Crabtree, wrestler professionally known as 'Big Daddy'
- Barney Cutbill, cricketer
- Jon Driver, scientist
- George Dyson, composer
- Arthur Edward Ellis, football referee
- Jonathan Fairbanks, builder of the Fairbanks House
- Tony Field, footballer
- Stuart Fielden, rugby league footballer
- Oliver Hannon-Dalby, cricketer
- Howard Greenhalgh, music video and advertising director
- Elena Greenhill Blaker (1875–1915) outlaw active in Patagonia
- David Hartley, philosopher
- Brian Highley, television and Trivial Pursuit question writer
- Charlie Hodgson, rugby union fly half for England and Saracens
- Charles Horner, jeweller and inventor of the Dorcas thimble
- Jocelyn Horner, sculptor and teacher
- Nick Holmes, singer of the band Paradise Lost
- Barrie Ingham, actor
- Paddy Kenny, footballer
- John Kettley, weatherman
- Don Lang, musician
- Nick Lawrence, radio presenter
- John Lawton, singer in the band Uriah Heep
- Alex Lees, cricketer
- Anne Lister, diarist and former owner of Shibden Hall
- Ernest Lister, eighth Governor of the U.S. state of Washington
- John Mackintosh, created Mackintosh's Toffee, which became Rowntree Mackintosh
- Harold Vincent Mackintosh 1st Viscount Mackintosh of Halifax and chocolate manufacturer
- Jim Mallinder, Northampton Saints coach
- Brian Moore, rugby union footballer, TV presenter, pundit and journalist
- Thomas Nettleton, local physician who carried out some of the earliest systematic programs of smallpox vaccination
- John Noakes, TV presenter
- John Pawson, architect
- Carolyn Pickles, actress
- James Pickles, barrister and circuit judge
- Wilfred Pickles, actor and radio presenter
- Kathryn Pogson, actress
- Eric Portman, actor
- Jesse Ramsden, inventor of the Ramsden theodolite
- John Alan Robinson, philosopher, mathematician, and computer scientist
- Sir Richard Saltonstall, colonist
- Rebecca Sarker, actress
- Sir Henry Savile, bible translator
- Percy Shaw, inventor of cat's eyes, used on public roads
- Robin Simon, guitarist of Ultravox, Magazine and Visage
- Sir Matthew Smith, artist
- Oliver Smithies, Nobel Prize winning geneticist and physical biochemist
- Sir James Stansfeld, Radical and Liberal politician and social reformer
- Herbert Akroyd Stuart, inventor of the hot-bulb engine (ancestor to the diesel engine)
- John Tillotson, Archbishop of Canterbury (1691–1694)
- Brian Turner, chef, restaurateur and TV personality
- John E. Walker, Nobel Prize winning chemist
- Gareth Widdop, Rugby league footballer
- Emma Williams, West End musical theatre actress
- John Wolfenden, Baron Wolfenden, chairman of the Wolfenden committee
- Matthew Wolfenden, actor in ITV1's Emmerdale
- Patrick Woodroffe, science fiction and fantasy artist
- Dorothy Wordsworth, diarist and sister of William Wordsworth
- Frank Worthington, footballer
- Aaron Stainthorpe, poet, vocalist of High Parasite, My Dying Bride and others musical projects

== See also ==
- Calderdale Industrial Museum
- Listed buildings in Halifax, West Yorkshire
- Handley Page Halifax
- HMS Halifax
- Walterclough Hall
- Halifax power station
- Halifax child sex abuse ring
