= Bankfield Museum =

Historic house museum in West Yorkshire, England

Coordinates: 53°43′57″N 1°51′48″W

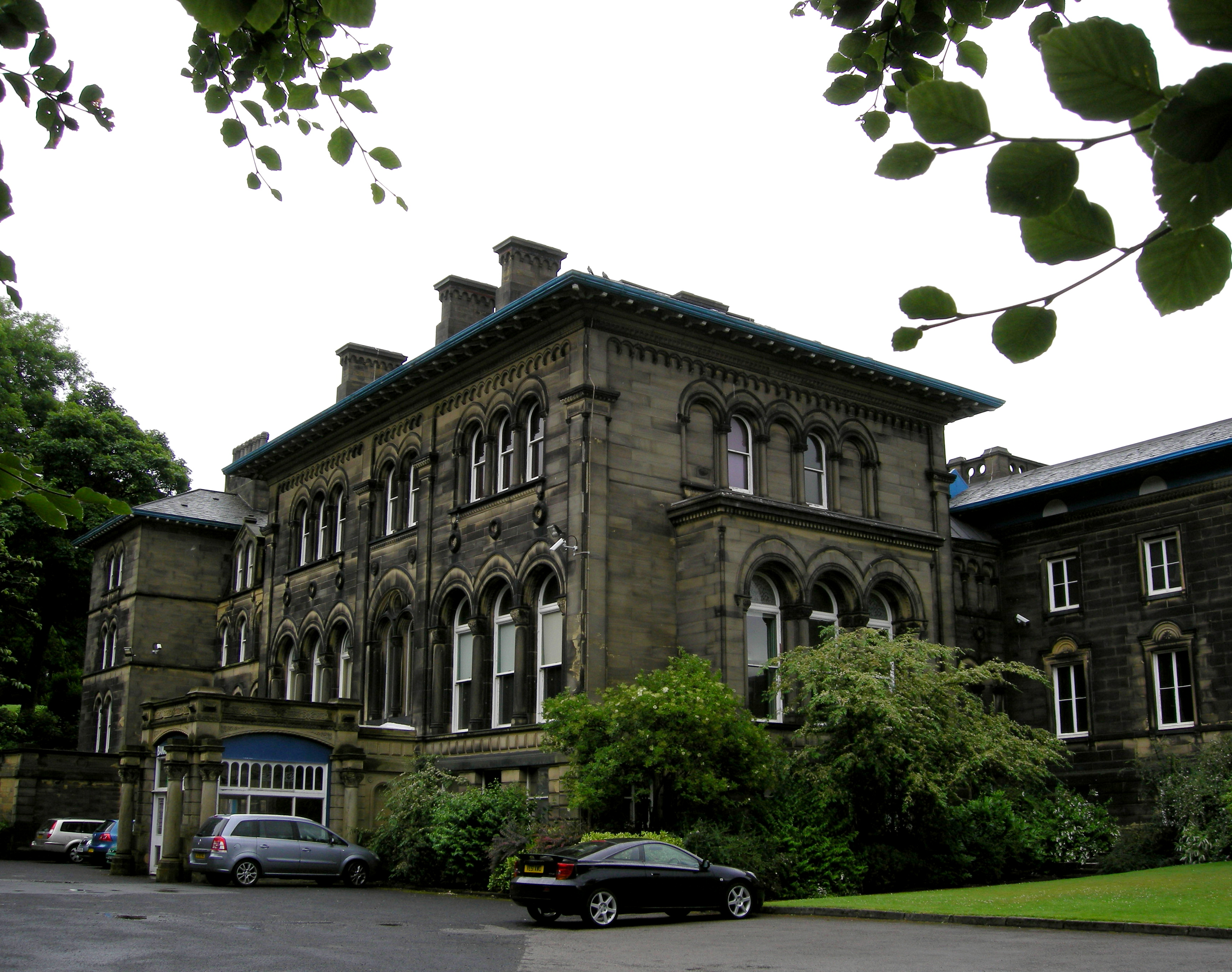
- Bankfield Museum, Halifax, West Yorkshire

- Shown in West Yorkshire
- Established: 1887
- Location: Boothtown Road, Halifax, West Yorkshire, England HX3 6HG
- Type: Textiles gallery, Historic house museum, Regimental museum.
- Public transit access: Halifax railway station First West Yorkshire (buses); Arriva Yorkshire (buses); Halifax Joint Committee (buses)
- Website: Bankfield Museum; Duke of Wellington's Regimental Museum

Bankfield Museum is a grade II listed historic house museum, incorporating a regimental museum and textiles gallery in Boothtown, Halifax, England. It is notable for its past ownership and development by Colonel Edward Akroyd, MP, and its grand interior.

== History ==
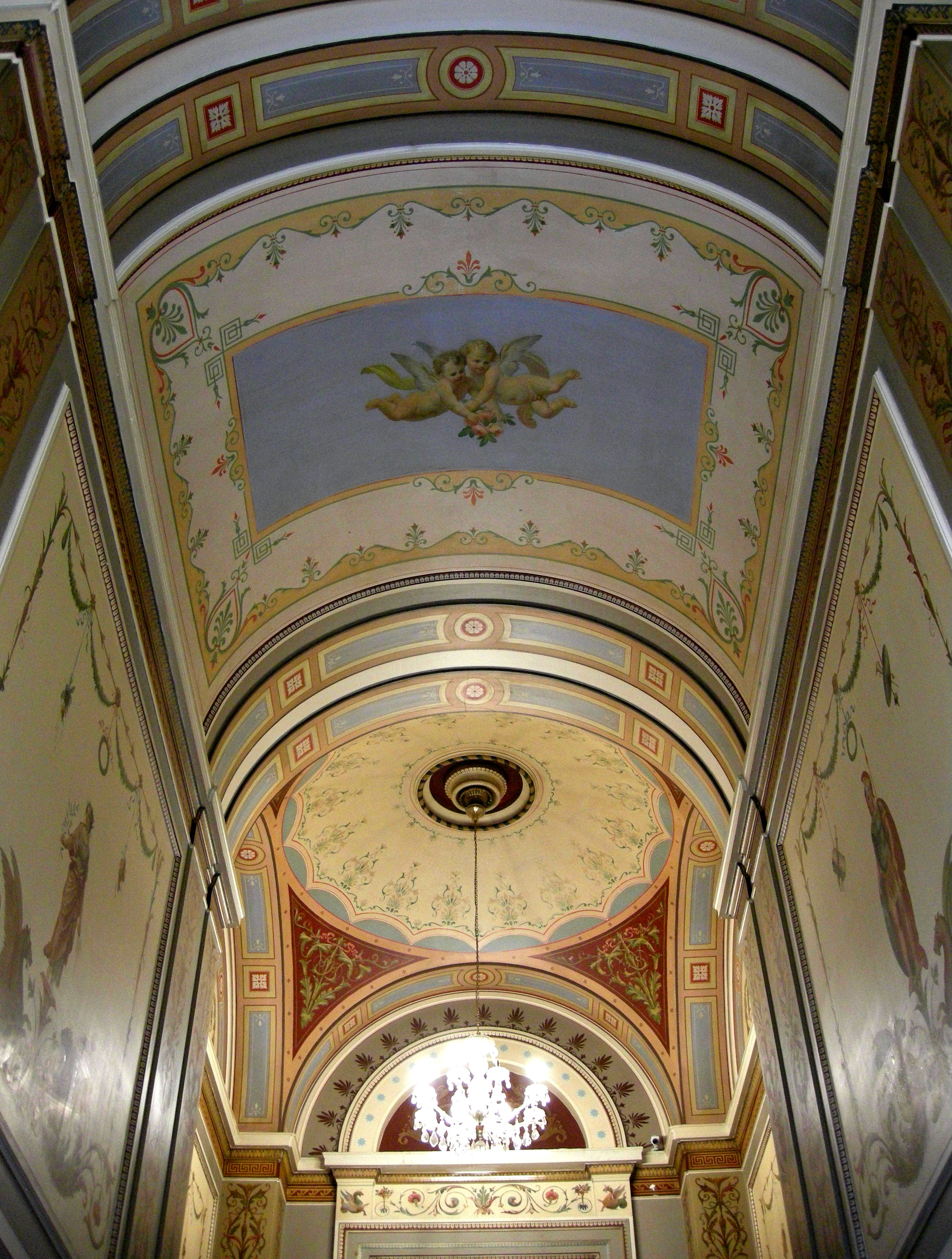
Painted ceiling above the grand staircase

When Edward Akroyd (1810–1887) bought this building in 1838, on his engagement to Elizabeth Fearby of York, it was a much smaller eight-roomed house, built c. 1800. He and his brother Henry were working for their father Jonathan Akroyd, a rich worsted mill owner, and living at Woodside Mansion in Boothtown. Jonathan died in 1848, and it was possibly Edward's inheritance which paid for the development of Bankfield which began around this time. Edward encased the 18th-century building in fairfaced stone and added two loggias, a dining room, Anglican chapel and kitchens.

By 1867 Akroyd was Member of Parliament for Halifax and obliged to entertain on a grand scale. When the future Edward VII visited Halifax to open the town hall in 1863, the royal party ate lunch and dinner with the mayor who had more space at Manor Heath, although the prince did visit the Akroyd family business at Haley Hill Mills. For this reason, the 1867 wing, designed by John Bownas Atkinson of York at a cost of £20,000, was spacious and decorated to impress. It had a porte-cochère, saloon, drawing rooms, library and billiard room. At its busiest, the mansion had 25 servants. Akroyd extended his influence beyond Haley Mills and Bankfield by building Akroydon close by: a model village of gothic terraced houses, allotments, park, cooperative, stables and All Souls’ Church, all designed by George Gilbert Scott.

By 1887 the business was in decline and Akroyd was dying. He sold the building to Halifax Corporation for £6,000 and retired to St Leonards-on-Sea in East Sussex, where he died. The house was immediately turned into a museum and branch library, but over time the original features were neglected, and some elements were lost; however the building was listed grade II in 1954. The building has now been restored as far as possible. Calderdale Council has done this because "Together Akroydon and Bankfield symbolise the importance of the textile industry to Victorian Britain and the central role that Halifax played in this story." Meanwhile 25,000 natural history specimens were transferred to Leeds City Museums in 1990 and the archaeology collections loaned to Kirklees Museums in 1979. A number of collections, in particular a large textile collection, were listed in 1999.

== Duke of Wellington's Regiment Museum ==
The museum was partly closed for phase one of a refurbishment in 2005, and was reopened on 22 October 2005 by Lady Jane Wellesley the daughter of the 8th Duke of Wellington. It was again partly closed to complete phase two in 2008 and reopened on 11 November 2008, after receiving further Heritage Lottery Fund grants. The museum shows the history of the Havercake regiment from its beginnings in 1702 as the Earl of Huntingdon's Regiment of Foot to its demise, when it was amalgamated with the Prince of Wales's Own Regiment of Yorkshire and The Green Howards to form the Yorkshire Regiment on 6 June 2009, using accounts from serving soldiers and interactive displays.

The regiment comprised the combined 33rd and 76th foot Regiments, which were linked in 1881, as the 1st and 2nd battalions and based at Wellesley Barracks. Arthur Wellesley, 1st Duke of Wellington was colonel of the 33rd, named after him when he died. The 76th served in India and carried two stands of Queens and Regimental colours, one which was an honorary stand awarded by the East India Company, so the combined regiment carried four colours on parade.

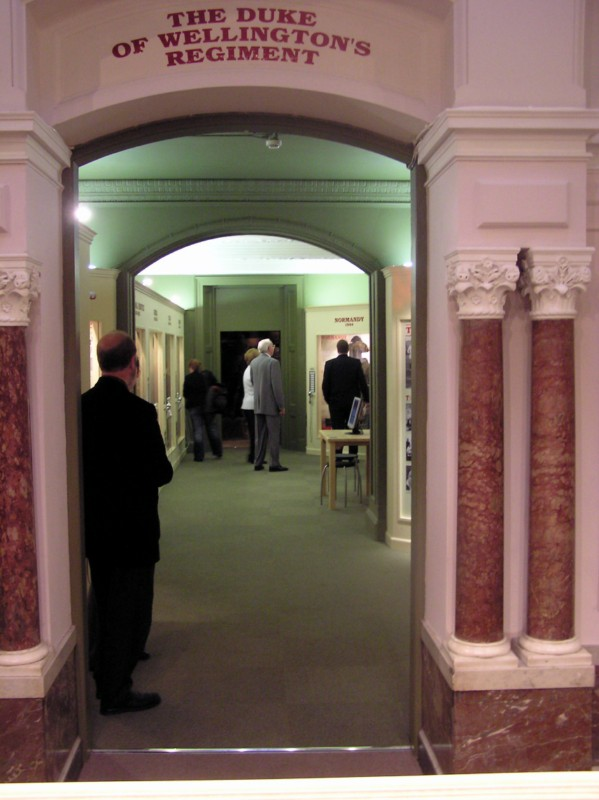
Dukes Museum exit

The regiment's headquarters (now an area headquarters of the Yorkshire Regiment) and archives are at Wellesley Park in Halifax. In 1860 Edward Akroyd paid for and recruited the 4th Yorkshire West Riding (Halifax) Rifle Volunteers, absorbing the 7th battalion formed in 1959. In 1883 the title of the regiment changed to the First Volunteer Battalion (Duke of Wellington's) West Riding Regiment. A further change took place in 1908 when it became the 4th Battalion (Duke of Wellington's) West Riding Regiment. In 1938 it changed name and role once more to the 58th Anti-Tank Regiment (DWR) Royal Artillery. Following several more mergers of battalions in the Duke of Wellington's Regiment it eventually became part of the 3rd Battalion Yorkshire Volunteers (Duke of Wellington's). In 2006 they became part of 4th Battalion The Yorkshire Regiment. As MP he supported the establishment of the Regimental Depot in Halifax. The Bankfield Museum assists with research and educational activities in connection with this department.

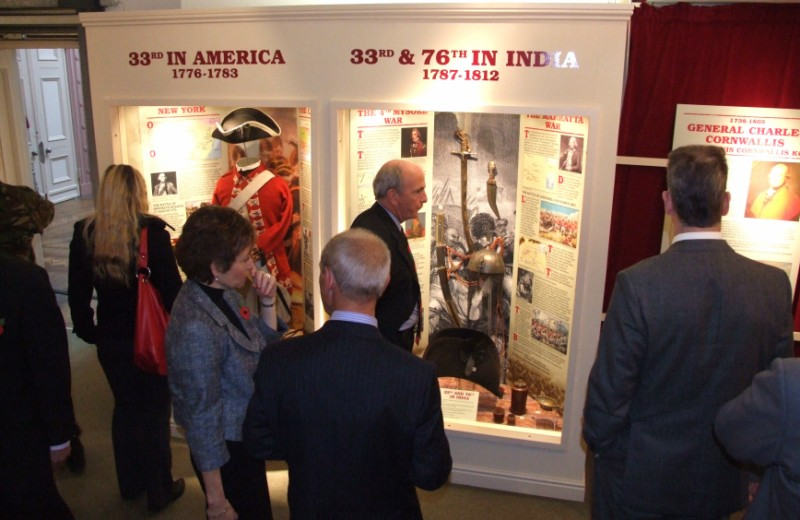
Early history section

"The Regiments’ Battle Honours range from the Battle of Dettingen (1743) to the Battle of the Hook, Korea (1953) and then to a Theatre Honour in the Iraq War (2003), together with many other unrecognised actions. Twenty one Battalions served during the First World War and during the Second World War men from twelve Battalions served as tank crews, artillery men and engineers in addition to their traditional role as infantryman. Since 1945, the Dukes have served with United Nations Forces in several operations, in addition to their tours of duty in Northern Ireland."

== Description ==
=== Exterior ===
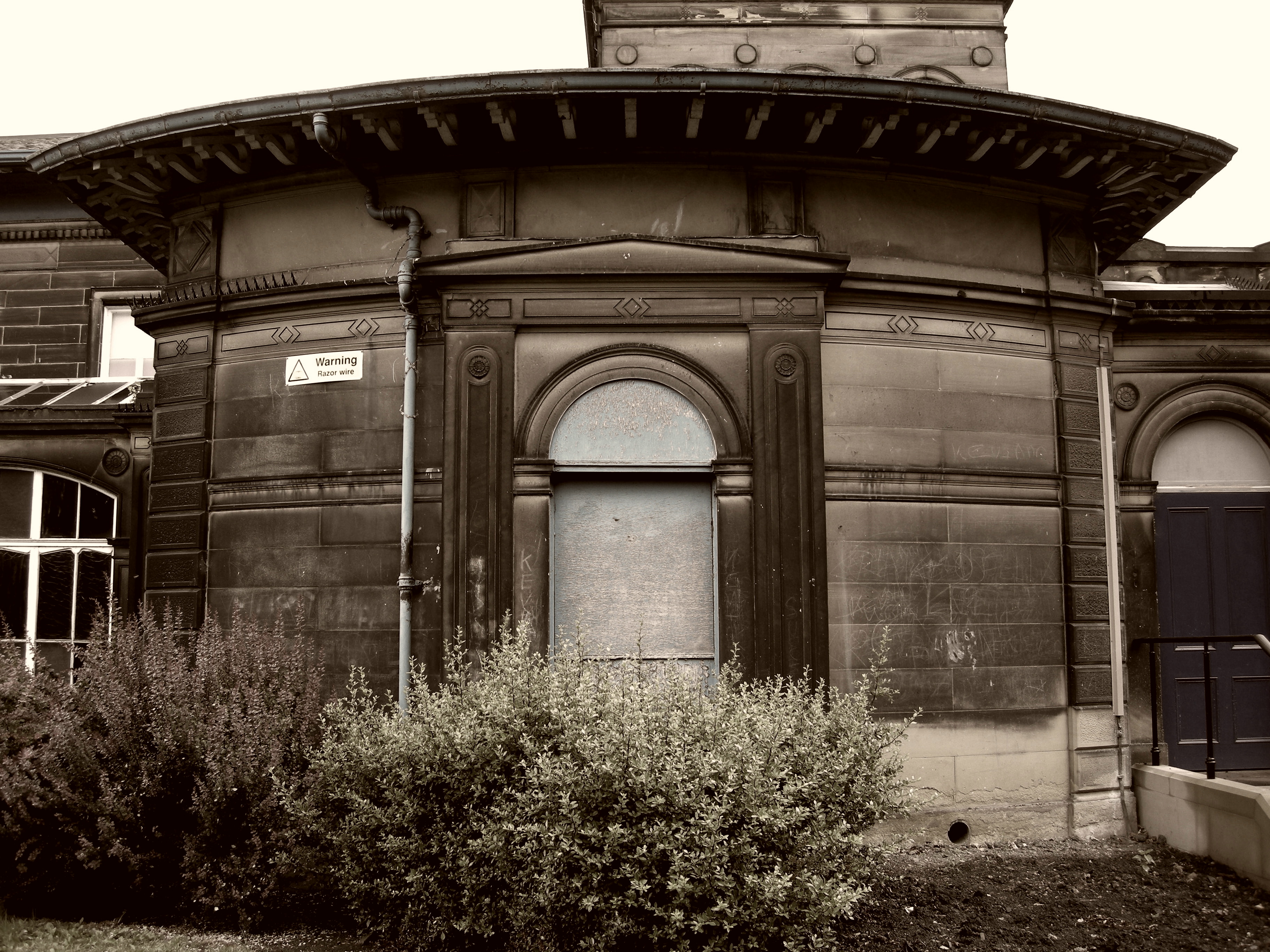
Exterior of the morning room, now the Akroyd gallery

The wide eaves and fairfaced stone give the building an Italianate appearance. The pillared and enclosed entrance lobby was originally an open porte-cochere, or covered entrance-way for carriages, which would drive under the stone canopy for the passengers to disembark.

The forecourt has a bowed screen wall. The stone mansion has an irregular shape due to various extensions. It consists of two arcaded storeys above a basement, especially in the 1867 wing. There are great eaves below a hipped and slated roof, and it is generally designed in the style of 14th to 15th century Italy. The basement is rusticated. From the back the low belvedere tower which lights the back staircase is visible. The arcaded loggias, originally open to the air, are now enclosed and altered.

=== Interior ===
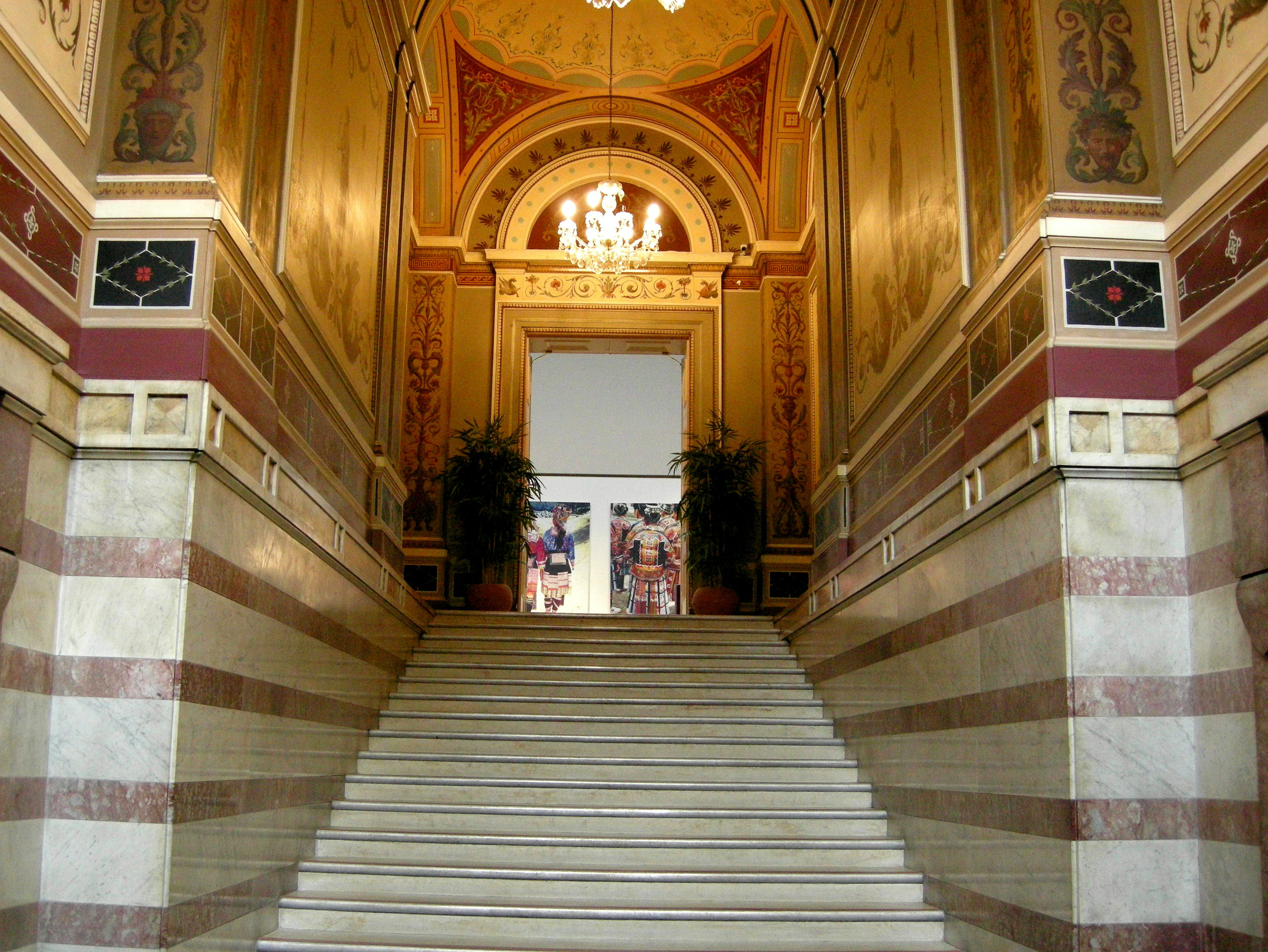
Grand staircase

The grand staircase is marble, and the decorations are inspired by the frescoes of Pompeii and Herculaneum, although the wall-design at the bottom of the stairs appears to be Egyptian revival. The dining room is now the temporary exhibition gallery. It has a classical style marble fireplace, and a plaster frieze featuring the royal coat of arms. The Regimental Museum occupies the original drawing room suite. Below the library was the billiard room, accessible from the bottom of the staircase, through the red door on the right. The 1867 block has warm air grilles in the skirting boards, and the heating was probably provided by a boiler. However, there is a legend that hot air was ducted from the Haley Mill nearby. On the floors of the marble gallery and the chapel lobby are encaustic tiles by Maw & Co. of Staffordshire.

==== The saloon ====
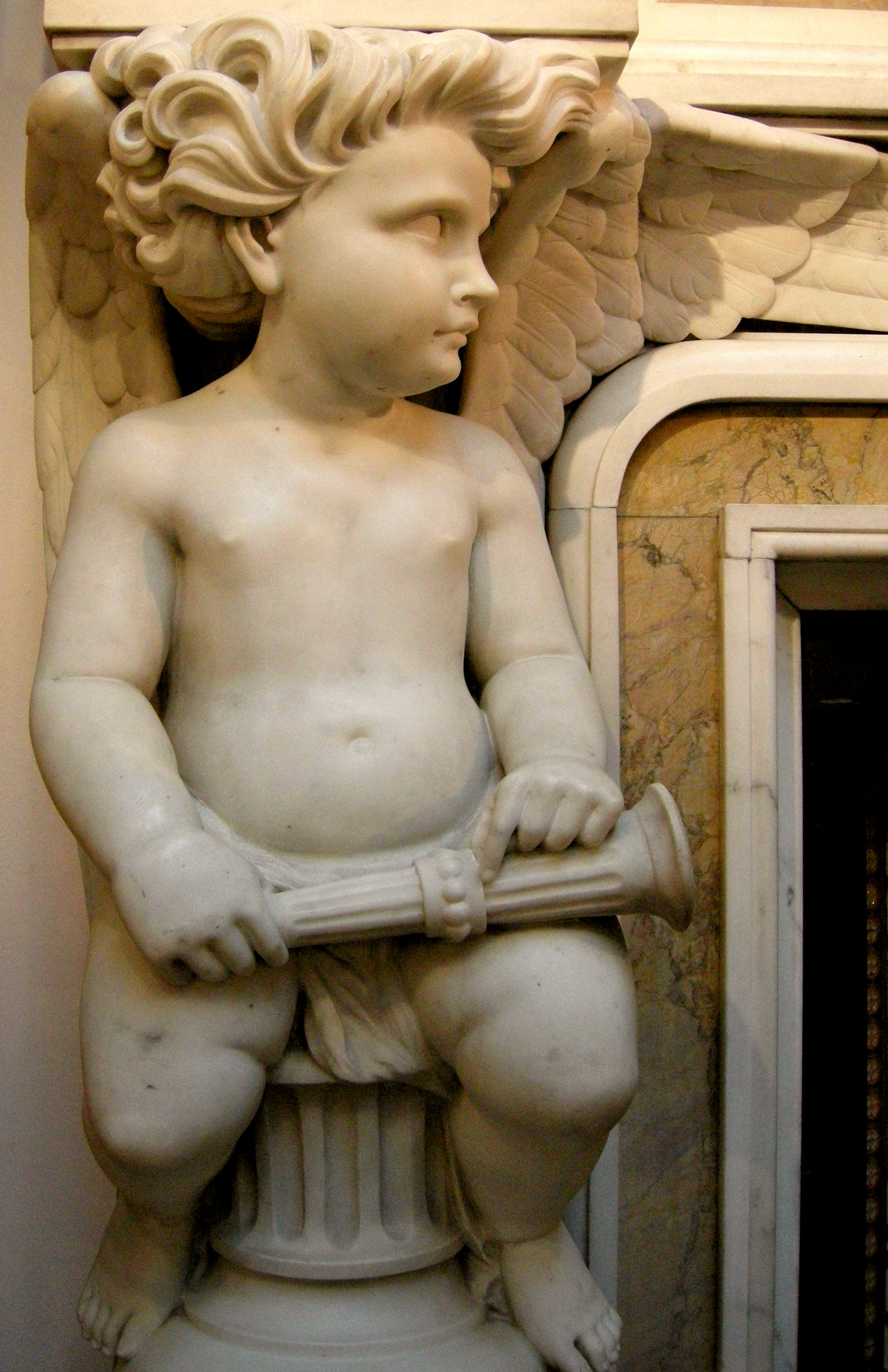
Marble putto on fire surround in saloon

This is now the entrance hall and shop, and the walls are used to display temporary exhibitions. The saloon was also the grand hall, reception room, picture gallery and ballroom, with a little furniture at the sides, many oil paintings and gasoliers. It has rooflights with painted plaster decorations in the classical style around them. The marble fireplace features two large putti holding trumpets. Putti are also the central feature on the grand staircase ceiling – possibly a wistful element as Akroyd and his wife had no children.

==== The library ====
This is now the World of Textiles gallery, with the exhibits in the original oak bookcases. It was a very light room, the north and east walls having three great windows on each, and fittings for three chandeliers on the ceiling. The windows have etched glass semicircular panels at the top, in designs reflecting the stylised patterns on the ceiling. In one of the bookcases is a display of silverwork by Halifax jeweller Charles Horner (1837–1896).

===== Ceiling =====
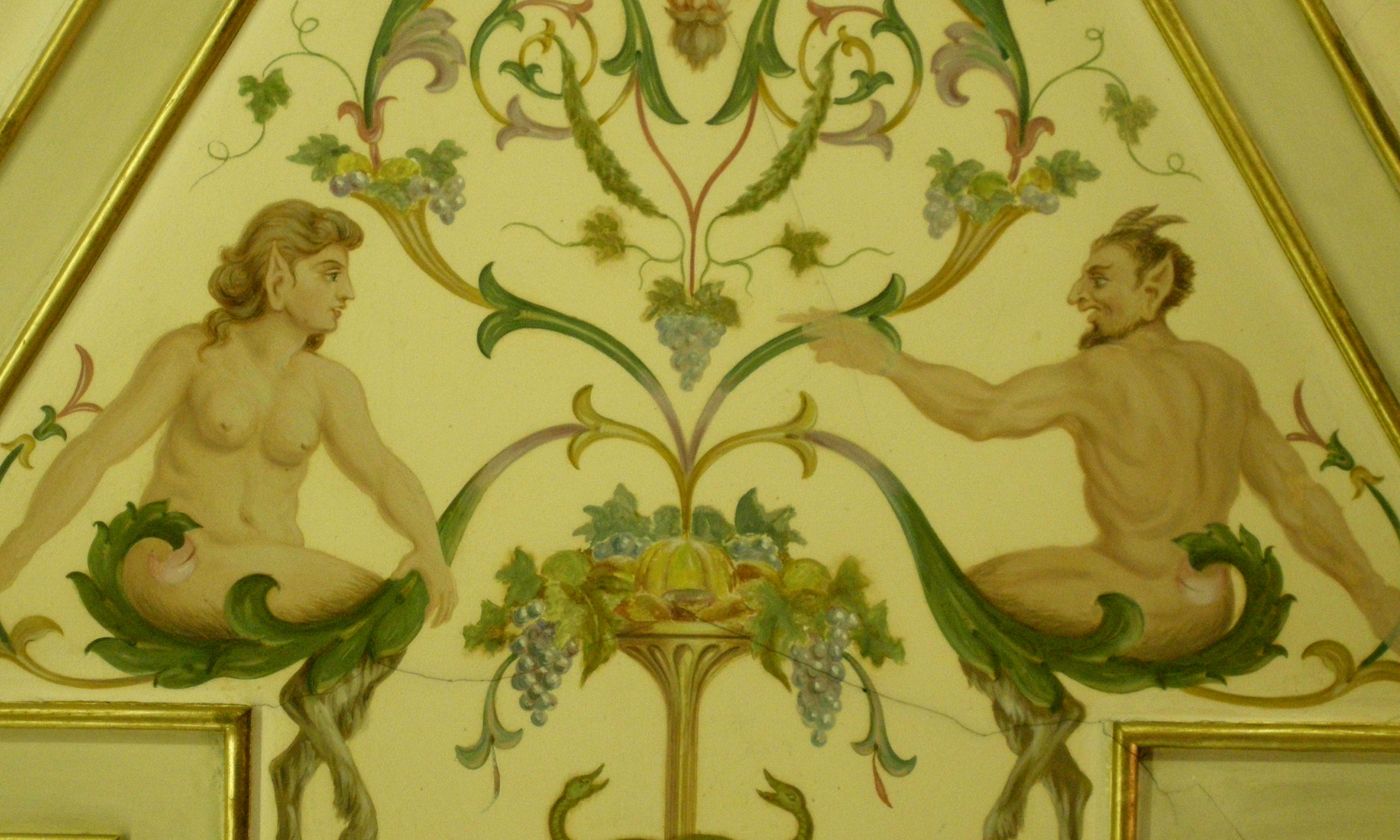
Painted fauns on library ceiling

The library was originally also the smoking room, so it is surprising that the original painted ceiling has survived and could be fully restored. The ceiling is heavily painted, gilded and sculptured in an eclectic manner, taking its general design from classical sources. The background is cream, but there is much use of Pompeiian red, an earth colour which gained popularity in Victorian England after the renewed excavations by Giuseppe Fiorelli in 1860. Small panels feature clearly painted classical motifs and portraits with distressed backgrounds, to look like pieces of ancient frescoes. Four medallions show the named poets Shakespeare, Milton, Chaucer and Tennyson, all admired by the Romantics. All the spaces on the cream background are filled with illustrations imitating the original maiolica style, featuring stylised goats and fauns, cornucopia, grapes, birds and flowers, but also angels and putti in the centre. The decoration around the edge has a Green Man.

===== Fireplace =====
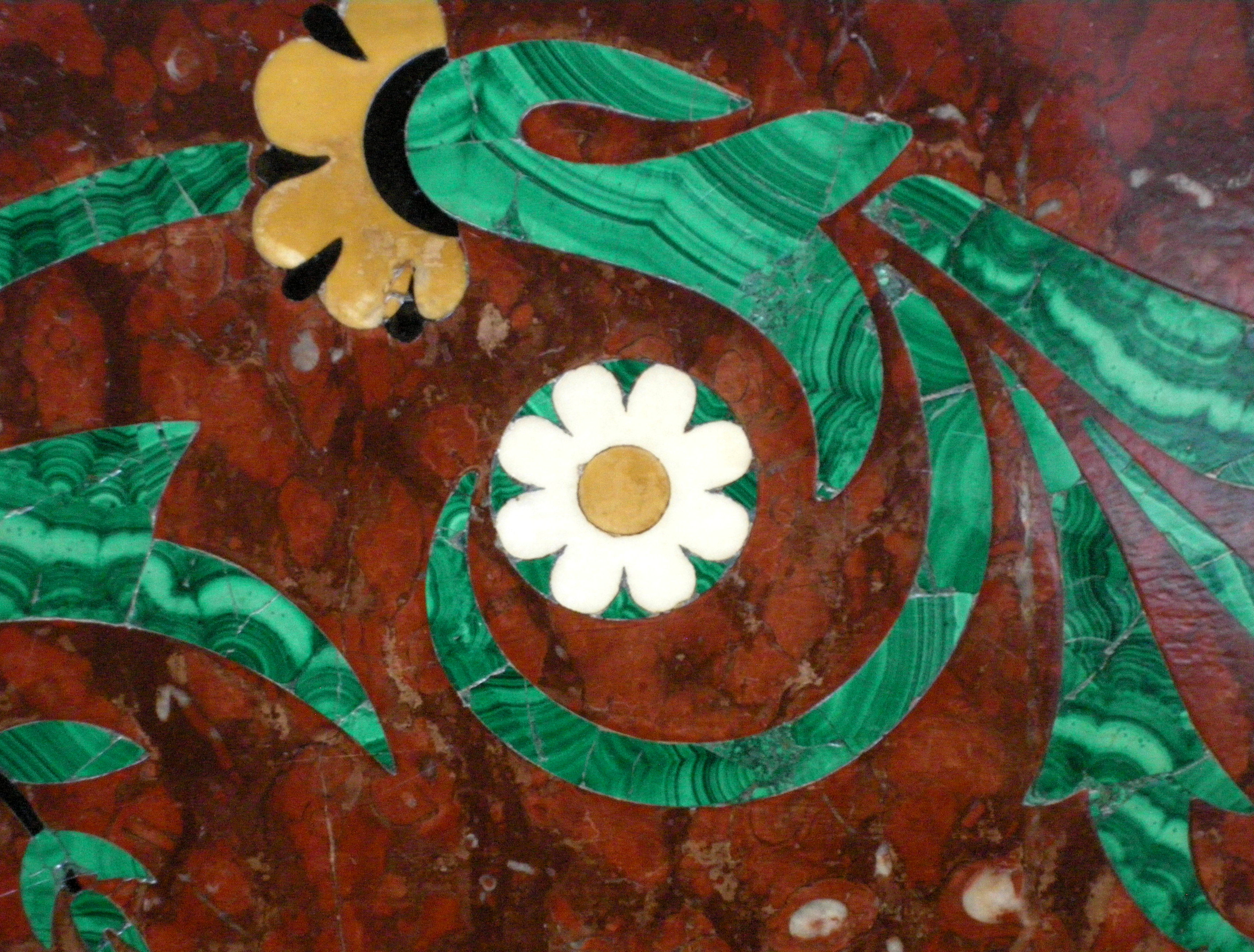
Inlaid design on fire surround

The fireplace is red Rouge de Rance marble with cream and black marble, patterned with inlaid semi-precious stone including green malachite: all imported materials. The intertwined initials of Edward and Elizabeth his wife are central on the fire surround and fireback, which is prominently dated 1867. The inlay features the White Rose of Yorkshire, possibly in Parian marble, which is repeated on the carved corinthian columns on the fire surround. The mantelshelf is massive enough to support three lifesized marble busts: Edward Akroyd on the left, his father Jonathan in the centre, and his wife Elizabeth Fearby (d.1884) on the right (by the Florentine sculptor Niccolò Bazzanti (1802–1869)). The bust of Elizabeth is remarkable in that it has the trompe-l'œil effect of a veil over the face. The glazed hearth tiles are similar to Mintons tiles but are probably locally made.

==== Back staircase ====
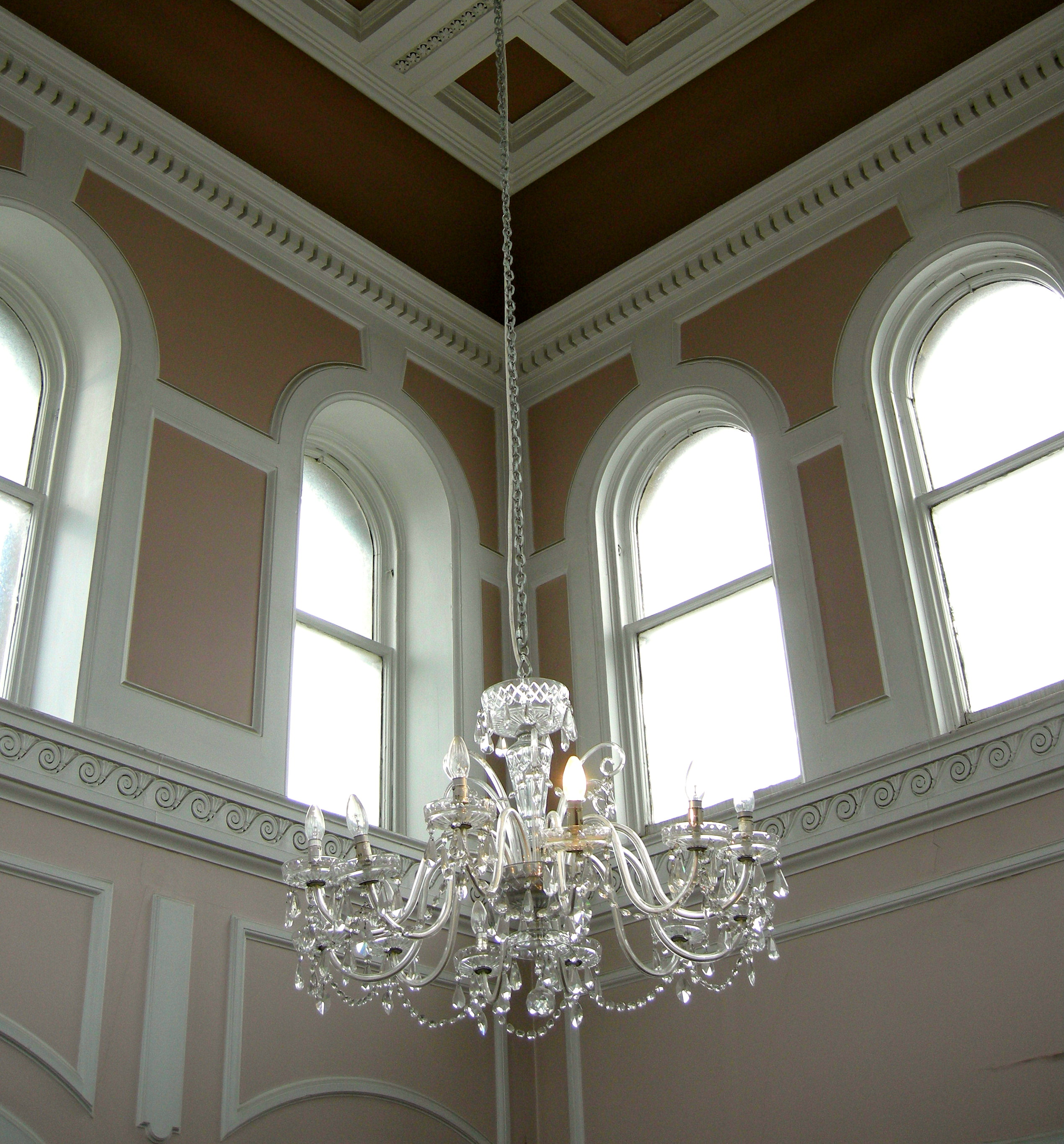
Stairwell in belvedere tower, with chandelier

On the wall of the stairwell are low relief plaster sculptures of Night and Day after works by the Danish sculptor Bertel Thorvaldsen. They symbolically divide the night quarters upstairs from the day quarters downstairs. The oak balustrade has turned balusters and brass finials in the shape of lions, because Elizabeth's family coat of arms featured lions. The ceiling is heavily coffered, but there are windows round the top of the stairwell and a great glass chandelier, so it is very light – in fact the stairwell is built as a separate tower so as to permit so many windows.

== People associated with the museum ==
The Halifax Literary and Philosophical Society was started by 13 Halifax merchants, professionals and military officers in 1830 for research and study, to promote science and the arts and to start a museum to display their collections. These collections of curios were acquired from their Grand Tours and travels for business and military purposes; they were objects of geology, natural history, anthropology, the arts, as well as oddities from around the world. Their museum was at first successful but by 1895 had declined, so was closed and the exhibits given to Halifax museums. Some of Bankfield's share has survived and a few items are exhibited to demonstrate Victorian antiquarian taste.

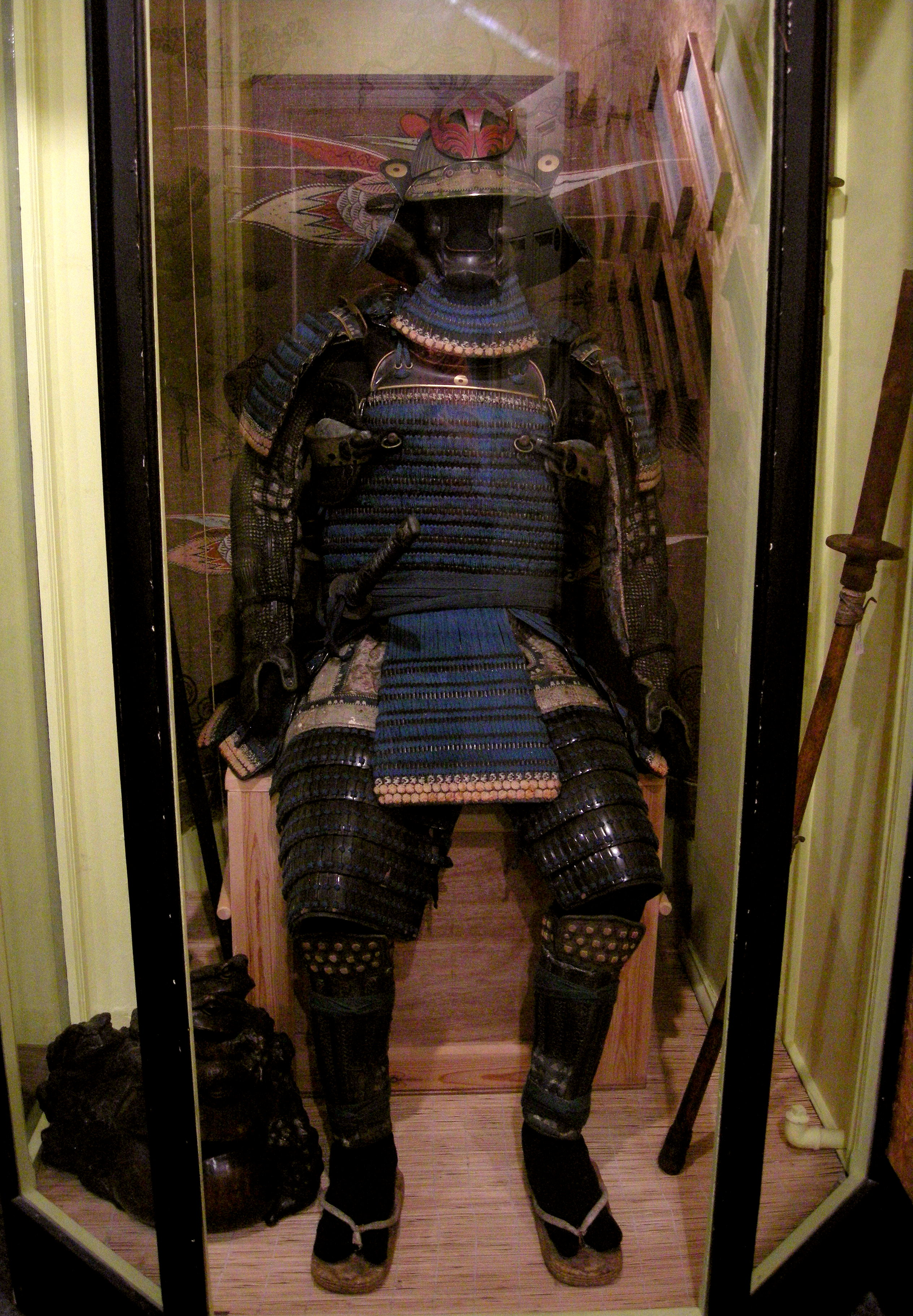
Japanese armour, 19th century

Lemuel Clayton was a Halifax councillor, silk spinner and one of the co-founders of Bankfield Museum in 1887. He was a member of the Literary and Philosophical Society, had travelled the world and amassed a collection of curios, and these curios were some of the first exhibits shown in the museum. One of the curios was a stone carving of a baby which he acquired in 1886 from the Higashi Honganji temple at Kyoto. It was not appropriate for him to take home one of these stone babies which were images intended to bring luck to childless women, but Clayton convinced the jūshoku to allow him to have one, after insisting that he was not a missionary. So in 1887 yet another image of a baby was added to the number already in Bankfield House's decorations while the childless Elizabeth Akroyd was still alive and her husband had died the same year.

Emile Clement (1844–1928) donated or sold some of his Western Australian aboriginal material to the museum, but this collection was later given to Manchester Museum.

Henry Ling Roth was an anthropologist and curator of the Halifax museums between 1900 and 1925. He published numerous items on anthropology, including 23 numbers of Bankfield Museum notes. He was "The man who developed a small, confused, unattractive museum into an important centre of spectacular interest and research". The museum had followed the 18th century pattern of displaying curiosities, but Roth classified and rearranged the displays for educational purposes about peoples of the world and of the past. His main interest was textiles, so he displayed textile machinery from Calderdale and "an old spinning jenny in use at Dobcross until 1916". He acquired and displayed spinning wheels, looms and textiles from the southern and eastern continents. He was commended for this in 1916.

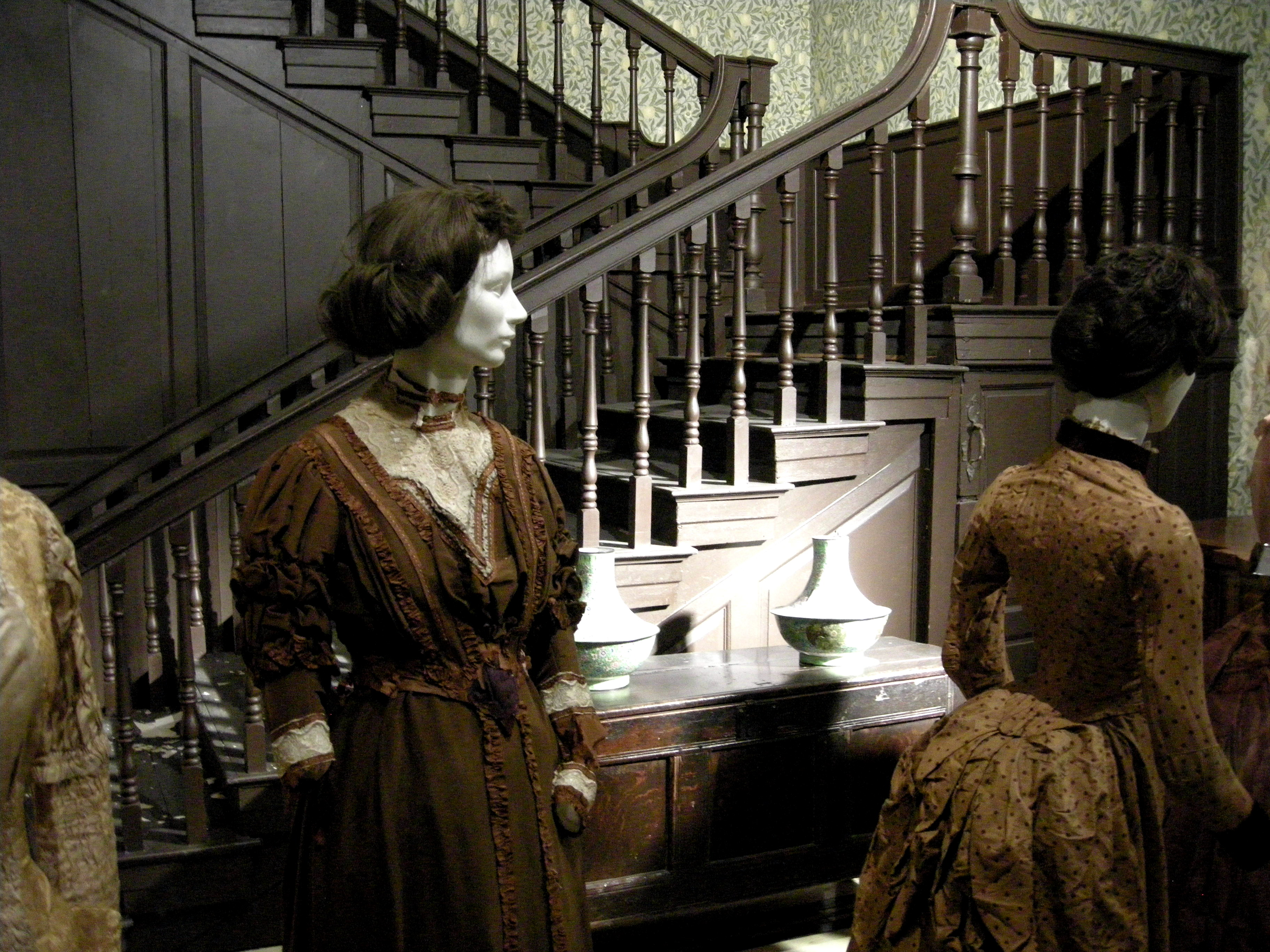
Costume display

Edith Durham was an anthropologist and collector of Balkan textiles who donated her collection to the museum in 1935. It is thought that the museum possibly acquired this important collection as Bankfield still carried the reputation given to it by Ling Roth, or perhaps because Roth's successor from 1925 to 1932 as curator was George Carline, brother of Edith Durham's friend Hilda Carline. The Durham collection was displayed at Bankfield in the "Bread and Salt in our Hearts" exhibition in 1997.

== Events ==
The museum hosts a series of temporary exhibitions; for example in 2009 there was an exhibition of Chinese-inspired textiles. There are regular events, including talks for the public, and workshops and drop-in activities for children, plus Key Stages 2 and 3 education programmes.

== See also ==
- Listed buildings in Halifax, West Yorkshire
