= Walterclough Hall =

Coordinates: 53.7159°N 1.8211°W

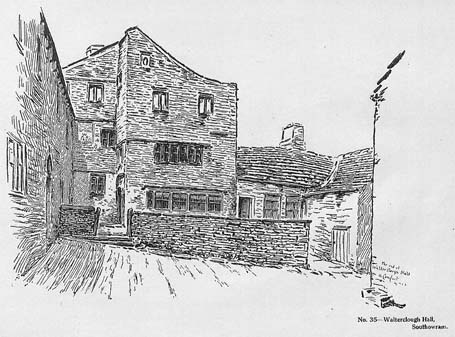
Walterclough Hall by Arthur Comfort 1913

Walterclough Hall, sometimes known as Water Clough Hall or Upper Walterclough, lies in the Walterclough Valley south-east of Halifax and north-east of the village of Southowram in the West Riding of Yorkshire, alongside the Red Beck.

== Origins ==
The Hall was originally built by the Hemingway family, first recorded there in 1379 and in residence until 1654.

== Walker family ==
In that year Walterclough Hall was bought by William Walker (1596–1676), before he moved to Lower Crows Nest. The initials of his second son, Abraham Walker (1629–1695), and of his wife Anne née Langley (1643–1688), were inscribed on the building. They were non-conformists and subject to the restrictions and harassments of the day. Their second son, Richard Walker (1672–1721), inherited the Hall from his father, and when he drowned in a canal, his son John Walker inherited the Hall from him.

John Walker (1699–1771) was the squire of Walterclough Hall in the mid-18th century and a woollen factor of great prestige and wealth. While he and his wife, Ruth née Nodder, had four children—Richard (b. 1731), John (b. 1735), Grace (b. 1738) and Mary (b. 1740)—they also adopted his nephew, Jack Sharp, and provided a home for four aunts and two uncles.

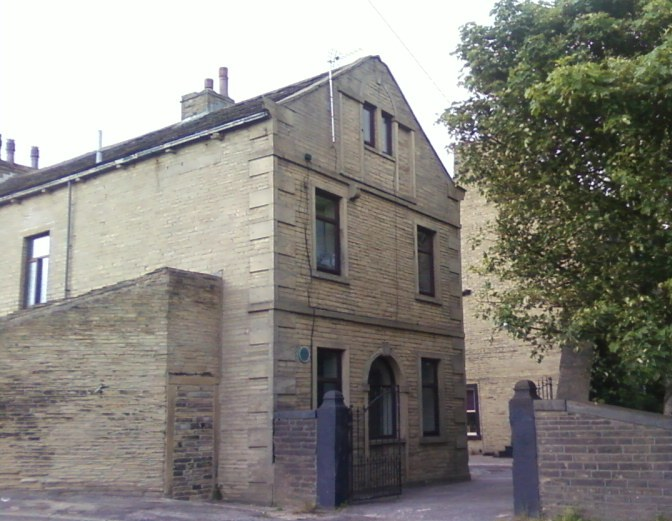
Law Hill House

John Walker’s youngest son, John, took no part in the business, so when his eldest son Richard died and John senior retired and left the district, Jack Sharp was left in possession of the business and the Hall, which he consumed with calculated avarice. In 1771, when John senior died, his surviving son John junior gave his cousin notice to quit the Hall. When he arrived from York with his new wife, he found the estate had been excessively mortgaged and most of the contents of the Hall had been removed. Only two rooms remained furnished, and what was left behind had been trashed. In 1778, Jack Sharp built Law House from the proceeds of his villainy on nearby Law Hill. Later, Miss Patchett established a Ladies Academy at Law House, and Emily Brontë taught there for six months in 1837-38. Her experiences at Law House and the now almost legendary story is believed to be the source for her only novel, Wuthering Heights.

In April 1867, the estate of the other Walker family of Crows Nest was sold by auction. This included most of the land at Hipperholme, Lightcliffe and Bailiff Bridge, as well as Crow’s Nest Mansion and Cliffe Hill Mansion. What happened to Walterclough Hall at this time is not yet known.

== Boarding academy ==
However, by 1870, Walterclough Hall had become a young ladies boarding academy. Elizabeth Ann Gregory ran the academy with her sister, Emma, and their sickly live-in brother, Charles. She employed four staff members. In 1871, there were two governesses, a cook, and a housemaid, and, in 1881, a governess, a cook, a kitchen maid, and a housemaid. She may also have employed four children, paying them with an education, free board, and lodging.

For the 1871 census, 18 young ladies were in residence, aged 11 to 19, and almost all from more distant parts; they were: Jessie Mosley, Fannie Mitchell, Helen Walter, Helen I. Simpson, Catherine Brown, Annie S. Aspinwall, Eleanor S. Graves, Mary I. Marsden, Marian Lomas, Sarah I. Speak, Clara Slack, Alberta Hellowell, Margaret Dempster, Gertrude Glendinning, Annie Bancroft, Elizabeth Wrigley, Amy Percival, and Mary D. Hamilton. There were also four young children, Francis Churchyard, Mary A. Stocks, William Town, and Arthur Town.

For the 1881 census, 14 young ladies were in residence, aged 14 to 17, but mainly aged 15 and 16, and over half from the surrounding region: Julia Bancroft, Anne M Kirby, Fanney [sic] Longworth, Kate White, Mary A. Whitiker [sic], Faney [sic] M. Scarby, Kate M. Smeeton, Ada Thomas, Lucy Lumb, Mary Blenkhorn, Florence Hirst, Annie Whitaker, Mary A. Bleasdale, and Susan Bentley. There were also four young local children: Rhoda Hoyle, Ethel Greenwood, Charles P. Greenwood, and Joe Walsh.

However, the changing demographics of the academy suggest the school’s reputation was in decline along with its finances. Whatever happened, the school closed after a few years, and the staff were discharged.

In 1888, Walterclough Pit, the largest and last coal pit in the area, was opened nearby, and in 1889, Charles Gregory finally died. Perhaps these also contributed to the academy’s ultimate demise. Nonetheless, by 1891, Emma Gregory was living alone at the Hall, seemingly retired. By 1901, the two sisters were again living together nearby in Halifax. Emma died in 1909, and Elizabeth in 1920.

== Decay ==
By 1913, when Arthur Comfort sketched Walterclough Hall, it was almost entirely unoccupied and in an advanced state of dilapidation with many broken windows and the interior in disarray.

During the Second World War, Walterclough Hall's windows were shattered by a bomb dropped nearby by a German bomber.

By the late 1960s and early 1970s, the only part of Walterclough Hall which remained standing was the façade onto the yard and the rooms immediately behind it, together with the attached single-storey kitchen. These remnants were demolished in the late 1970s.

An oil painting of the kitchen's interior was on display in the Smith Art Gallery in Brighouse during the 1970s. This painting showed one of the kitchen's unusual features which was a carved stone column which supported one of the roof joists. The kitchen ceiling was open to the slates. Water was supplied to a stone trough in the kitchen floor from a spring, which almost caused the death of one of the children then living at the hall.

Today, the site of the former Walterclough Hall is part of Walterclough Hall Farm of Walterclough Lane, Halifax.
