= Battle of Arakere =

Battle of the Third Anglo-Mysore War

- Part of the Third Anglo-Mysore War
- Grenadiers of the 76th Foot attacking Mysorean fortifications at the battle
Date	15 May 1791
Location	Arakere, India
Result	Anglo-Hyderabad victory

Belligerents
Sultanate of Mysore	East India Company; Hyderabad State

Commanders and leaders
Tipu Sultan	(East India Company) Charles Cornwallis; Nizam Ali Khan

Strength
Unknown	Unknown

Casualties and losses
~600	~600

The Battle of Arakere was fought near the Mysorean capital city of Seringapatam on 15 May 1791 during the Third Anglo-Mysore War. An army under Charles Cornwallis consisting of East India Company and British Army forces, along with allied forces from the Nizam of Hyderabad, arrived near Seringapatam, and sought a crossing of the Kaveri River near the village of Arakere where Tipu Sultan, Mysore's ruler, had established a defensive line. On 13 May, near Arakere, about 10 miles (16 km) below Seringapatam, Tipu decided to offer battle from a position on nearby heights. In the ensuing battle, Cornwallis's infantry managed to dislodge Tipu's men from the heights, but the Mysoreans regrouped and stood their ground until cavalry of the Hyderabad State smashed Tipu's lines. The Mysoreans broke, but they were able to retreat to Seringapatam under the protection of its surrounding defensive artillery. Cornwallis's men held the field but were in no state to give chase or lay siege, rendering their victory hollow.

Following the battle, Cornwallis made the difficult decision to retreat, as the army's supply situation had become so desperate that a siege would have been impossible, even if he could have joined with Robert Abercromby's troops. A hoped-for junction with Marathan troops also seemed unlikely, as Tipu had successfully prevented communication and intelligence of their position from reaching Cornwallis, and the most recent reports placed them some distance off. After ordering Abercromby to retreat on 21 May, Cornwallis ordered his siege train destroyed and began to retreat toward Bangalore on 26 May.

That very day, he was met by an advance company of the Marathan army. The next day that army, totalling some 40,000 cavalry, joined with his. The Marathan army was well-provisioned, so they were able to relieve some of the British army's stresses, although the prices they charged for their provisions were exorbitant. The combined army reached Bangalore on 11 July. Tipu took advantage of the retreat to make a concerted attack on Coimbatore, which fell after a lengthy siege in November.
