= The Halifax Academy =

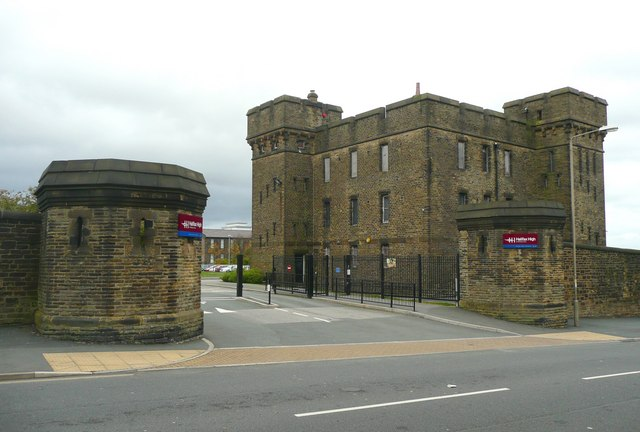

Location
- Gibbet Street; Halifax, West Yorkshire, HX2 0BA; England
- Coordinates: 53.7241°N 1.8932°W

Information
- Type: Academy
- Motto: Where Hearts and Minds Connect.
- Department for Education URN: 140326 Tables
- Ofsted: Reports
- Headteacher: Matt Perry
- Gender: Mixed
- Age: 4 to 16
- Enrolment: 1000+ as of January 2019
- Houses: Orion, Pegasus, Auriga
- Website: thehalifaxacademy.org

The Halifax Academy (formerly Halifax High) is a mixed all-through school located in Halifax, West Yorkshire, England.

== History ==
The school's name derives from the original The Halifax High School, a school in a town centre Victorian building off Huddersfield Road. The school was relocated to The former Wellesley Barracks in 2005. The Duke of Wellington's regiment regimental depot was based at the barracks until 1958.

Halifax High was formed in 1992 following the amalgamation of the Clare Hall and Haugh Shaw Schools. By 2003 the school was the tenth most improved in England according to government performance tables, and in 2007 was judged as 'outstanding' by Ofsted. It received a visit from Queen Elizabeth II in May 2004.

The school was converted to academy status on 1 November 2013 and was renamed The Halifax Academy. It has a secondary school for pupils aged 11 to 16 and a primary school phase, which opened in September 2014, making the academy an all-through school for pupils aged 4 to 16.

The June 2023 Ofsted (Office for Standards in Education) inspection rated the school as Grade 2 (Good) for overall effectiveness. It judged that the school had improved in mathematics and English. Pupil behaviour was considered 'Outstanding' due to the effectiveness of the school's house system.

The current Headteacher of the school is Matt Perry. The former Executive Headteacher of The Halifax Academy, Matt Kay, is now the CEO of the Impact Education Trust, which the school is a part of.

== Subjects ==
Mathematics, Science, English Language and English Literature are compulsory for all students to study until they leave the academy. When students enter Year 9 they are given the choice to choose two or three subjects from the following:

Art, Computer Science, Design, Geography, Graphic Communications, Health & Social Care, History, ICT, Spanish, German, Photography, PE, Religious Studies and Sport. They will sit GCSE examinations for these subjects in the second half of Year 11.

== House system ==
Pupils belong to one of three houses: Auriga, Orion and Pegasus – house names were chosen by pupils when the school moved from the previous location to Wellesley Park. There are competitions between houses each year, including a sports day and inter-house games. Houses and tutor groups raise money for charities such as Comic Relief and Children in Need. A pupil's house is identified by tie colour: sky blue for Auriga; dark maroon for Orion; and royal blue for Pegasus. This can be seen as accents on the student's ties.

== Incidents ==
Violent protests involving hundreds of students led to disruption and vandalism occurring in 2009 and 2020. In both instances, projectiles such as eggs were thrown and police were called to the school grounds to break up the pupils.
