= Arthur Comfort =

- Born: 11 November 1864; London, Middlesex, England
- Died: 1935 (aged 71); Halifax, Yorkshire, England
- Education: Graphic School of Wood Engraving
- Occupations: Wood-engraver; Draughtsman; Art teacher
- Notable work: Sketches of Old Halifax; Ancient Halls in and about Halifax; A Spring-Time Saunter: Round and About Bronte Land

Arthur Comfort (11 November 1864 – 1935) was a British wood-engraver at The Graphic in London and art teacher in Halifax.

== Life ==
Comfort was born in London on 11 November 1864, where he attended the Graphic School of Wood Engraving, and afterwards worked as an engraver for almost 15 years at The Graphic, a national illustrated journal founded in 1869 by William Luson Thomas and his brother Lewis Samuel Thomas. During that time, he achieved some renown for his watercolours, especially of flowers, and his work was exhibited in Brussels and at the Royal Academy in London. He was regarded as one of the few engravers of high rank at the end of the nineteenth century in Great Britain along with Charles Roberts, William Biscombe Gardner and Charles Frederick Ulrich. He became the chairman of the international Society of Wood Engravers, but, with the development of half-tone and screen blocks for illustrations, wood-engraving became obsolete, and he left the journal and moved north.

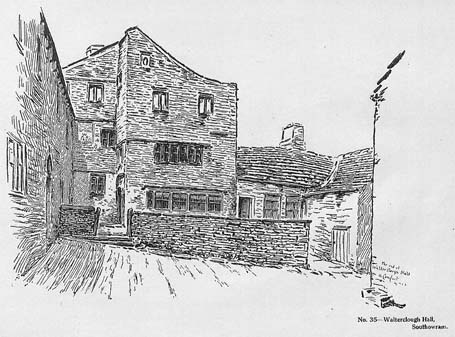
35. Walterclough Hall, Southowram from Ancient Halls in and about Halifax

Comfort settled in Halifax at Swires Road, and taught art at the local Heath Grammar School, Sowerby Bridge High School and Hebden Bridge Grammar School. He joined the Halifax Art Society, and developed some skill with pen and ink sketches, and mezzotints. The Halifax Evening Courier published two books of his sketches, Sketches of Old Halifax in 1912 and Ancient Halls in and about Halifax in 1913, and also A Spring-Time Saunter: Round and About Bronte Land by Whiteley Turner in 1913 which he illustrated.

Comfort died in 1935 aged 71 at the Royal Halifax Infirmary. He was survived by his wife, two sons and a daughter.
