= Warley Moor Reservoir =

- Fly Flatts Reservoir
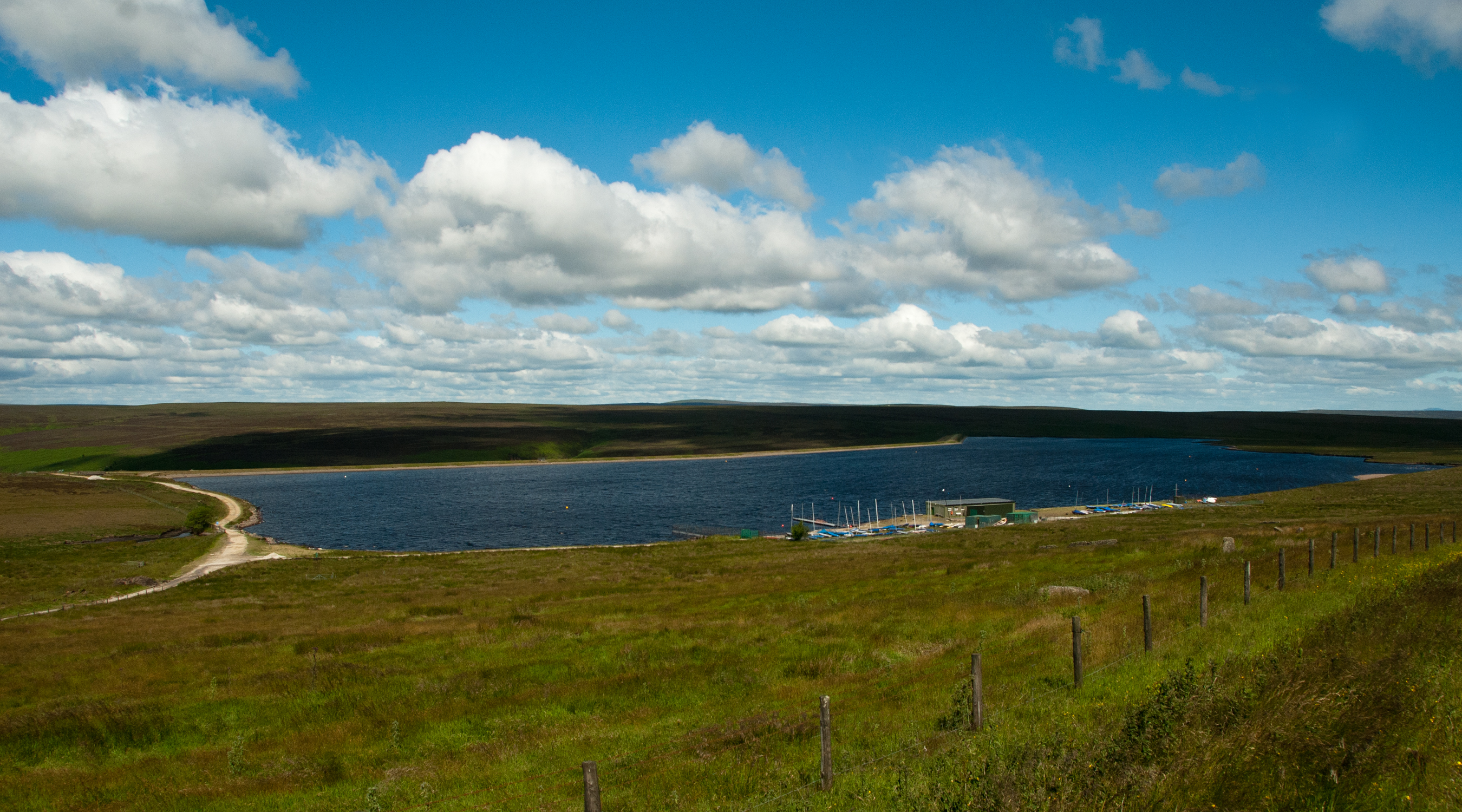
- Warley Moor Reservoir near to Ovenden Moor, Mixenden in West Yorkshire. This is the home of Halifax Sailing Club

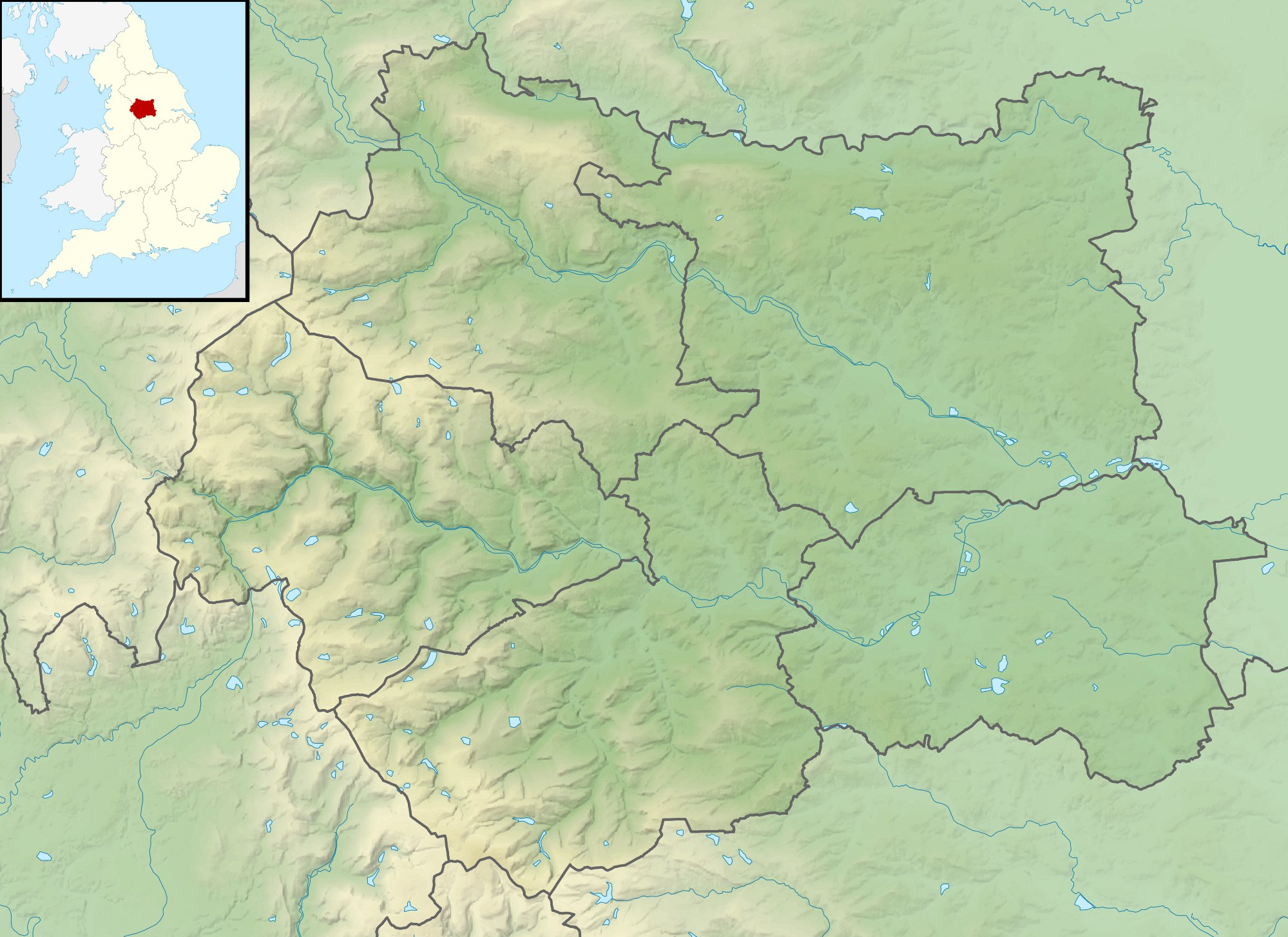
- Location within West Yorkshire
- Location: West Yorkshire
- Coordinates: 53.7824°N 1.9560°W
- Type: Reservoir
- Basin countries: England
- Managing agency: Yorkshire Water
- Built: 1872
- Surface area: 68 acres (28 ha)
- Average depth: 45 feet (14 m)
- Water volume: 193 million imperial gallons (880 ML; 710 acre⋅ft)

Warley Moor Reservoir, also known as Fly Flatts Reservoir, is a drinking water reservoir in West Yorkshire, England, owned and operated by Yorkshire Water.

Completed in 1872, the reservoir was built by the engineer John Frederick La Trobe Bateman. The first sod was cut on 20 May 1864, by the then Mayor of Halifax, William Holdsworth, who used a silver spade with the inscription:

Halifax Corporation – The first sod of the Warley Moor Reservoir was turned with this spade, on Friday, the 20th May, 1864, by William Irving Holdsworth, Esq., Mayor of Halifax; J. F. Bateman, Engineer; John Parkinson and Joseph Mann, contractors; J. E. Norris, Town Clerk

The reservoir covers 68 acres (28 ha), is 45 feet (14 m) deep when full and holds up to 193,000,000 imperial gallons (880,000,000 L). It was notably described in Whiteley Turner's 1913 book A Spring-Time Saunter: Round and About Bronte Land.

The reservoir is used by Halifax Sailing Club. It is also famous for being the reservoir Tommy Lee Royce cycled to in Series 3 of the BBC show Happy Valley.
