= Wellesley Barracks =

Former military installation in Halifax, West Yorkshire, England

- Halifax
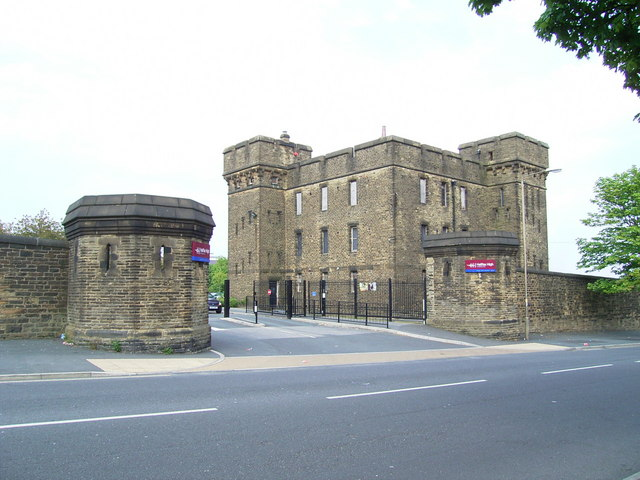
- Wellesley Barracks

Site information
- Type: Barracks
- Owner: Ministry of Defence
- Operator: British Army

Location
- Location within West Yorkshire
- Coordinates: 53.72299°N 1.89331°W

Site history
- Built: 1881
- Built for: War Office
- In use: 1881–1961

Garrison information
- Occupants: Duke of Wellington's Regiment

Wellesley Barracks is a former military installation in Halifax, West Yorkshire, England.

== History ==
The barracks was built in the Fortress Gothic Revival Style as a depot for the 33rd and 76th Regiment's. On 1 April 1873 the depot was established, with construction completed in 1877. On 1 September the Depot Companies of the 33rd and 76th Regiments marched in. Their creation took place as part of the Cardwell Reforms which encouraged the localisation of British military forces. Following the Childers Reforms, the 33rd and 76th Regiments amalgamated to form the Duke of Wellington's Regiment with its depot at the barracks in 1881.

A Regimental Museum was established at the barracks in 1921. The barracks was demoted to the status of out-station to the Yorkshire Brigade depot at Queen Elizabeth Barracks, Strensall in 1958 and the regimental museum collection was rehoused in the Bankfield Textile Museum in 1961, with the regimental archives and library remaining onsite. Although many of the buildings on the site were subsequently demolished, the keep was retained and is owned by Calderdale Council, with no public access. In 2005 the barracks became the site of the new Halifax High School (now The Halifax Academy).

== See also ==
- Listed buildings in Warley, West Yorkshire
