= Southowram =

Village in West Yorkshire, England

Coordinates: 53.708022°N 1.825003°W

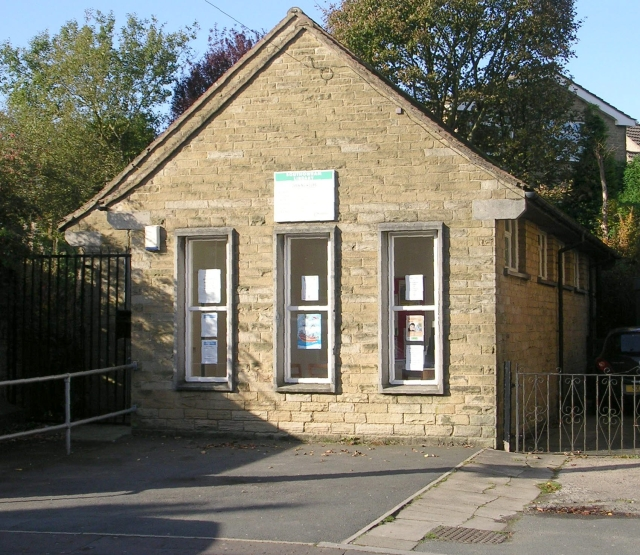
- Southowram Library, Law Lane

- Location within West Yorkshire
- OS grid reference: SE115235
- Metropolitan borough: Calderdale
- Metropolitan county: West Yorkshire
- Region: Yorkshire and the Humber
- Country: England
- Sovereign state: United Kingdom
- Post town: Halifax
- Postcode district: HX3
- Dialling code: 01422
- Police: West Yorkshire
- Fire: West Yorkshire
- Ambulance: Yorkshire
- UK Parliament: Calder Valley

Southowram (/ˈsaʊθɑːrəm/ sow-THAR-əm) is a village and former civil parish in Calderdale, West Yorkshire, England. It stands on hill top between Halifax and Brighouse, on the south side of the Shibden Valley. Northowram is on the northern side of the valley. Southowram falls within the Town ward of Calderdale Council. The village is included within the Halifax built-up area as defined by the Office for National Statistics.

== History and governance ==
The name Owram derives from the plural form of the Old English ofer meaning 'a flat topped ridge'.

Southowram was historically a township in the ancient parish of Halifax. By 1866 part of the township was included in the borough boundaries of Halifax. In 1866 the remainder of the township was declared to be a local government district, administered by a local board. Later that year the whole township was made a civil parish.

In 1894 local boards were reconstituted as urban district councils under the Local Government Act 1894, which also said that parishes could not straddle district boundaries. The part of Southowram parish within Halifax borough was therefore transferred to that parish, leaving a reduced Southowram parish covering just the urban district. In 1931 the parish had a population of 2,570.

The parish and urban district of Southowram was abolished on 1 April 1937, with most of the area, including the village itself, being added to the parish and municipal borough of Brighouse and a smaller part going to Elland. Brighouse Municipal Borough was abolished on 31 March 1974, becoming part of the Metropolitan Borough of Calderdale. No successor parish was created for the former borough and so Southowram is directly administered by Calderdale Metropolitan Borough Council.

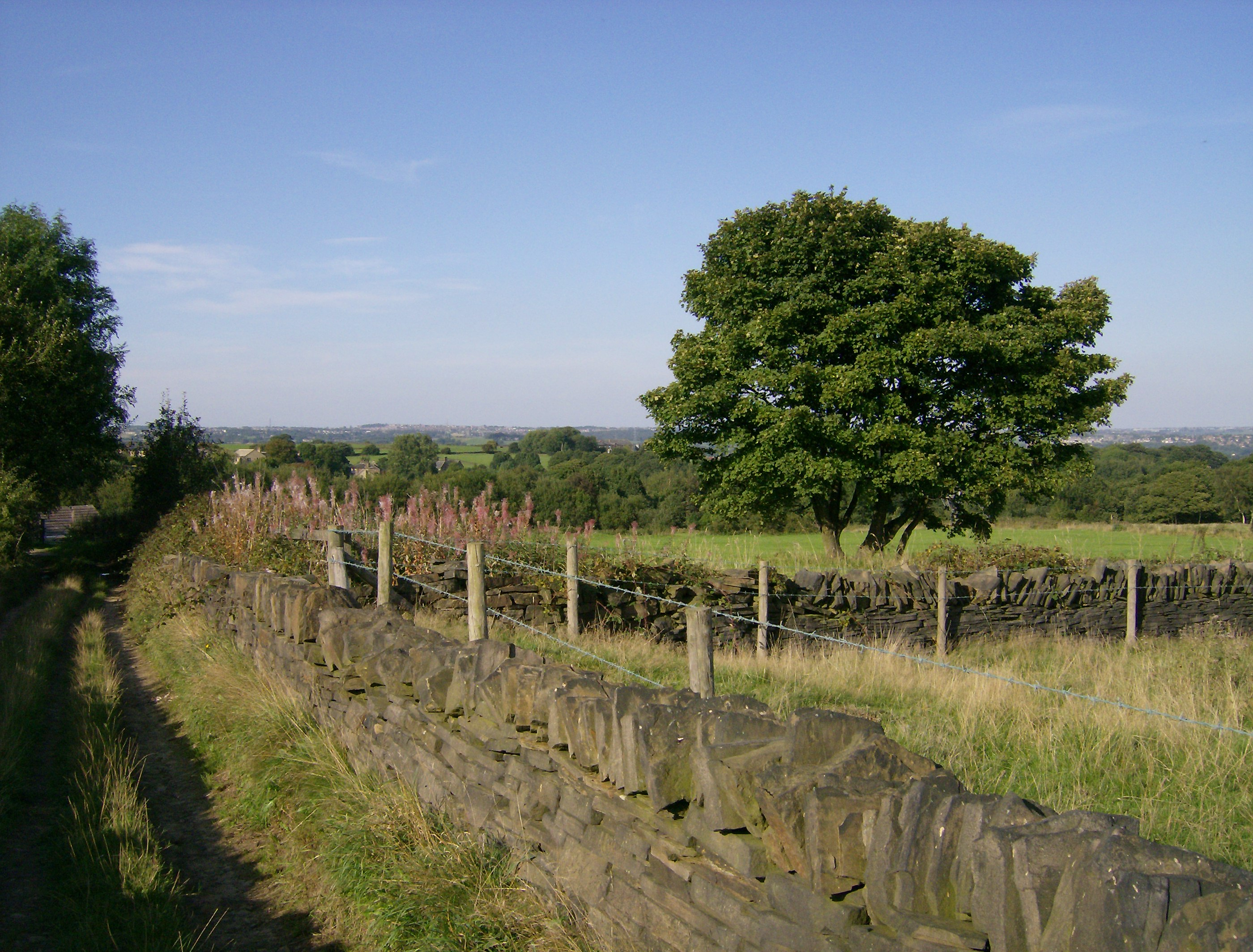
Ashday Lane

Parts of Southowram's village centre were demolished and rebuilt in the 1970s and 1980s, but many older buildings remain, as do the ancient stocks on Towngate. Old buildings were lost on New Street and were replaced by council housing. More such housing is to be found in the lower part of the village. Southowram retains in the main, however, a mixture of older historic and new housing, council owned and private housing.

A number of old halls and farms which survived until the 1940s and 1950s were lost in subsequent decades.

== Landmarks ==
=== Law Hill House ===
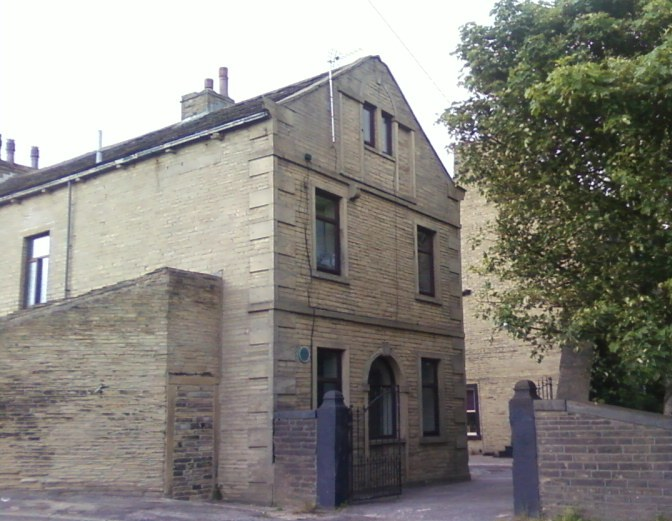
Law Hill House

In 1837, at the age of 19, Emily Brontë came to teach at the three-storey house on Law Lane which was then an exclusive boarding school. She stayed for only about six months, however, because of the strict lifestyle demanded. She was homesick and in a collection of letters, her sister Charlotte wrote about how Emily had to work from 6 a.m. to 11 p.m. each day and was more of a governess than a teacher. Emily wrote poetry while at Law Hill and became fascinated by the story of intrigue and feuding which surrounded the house's builder, Jack Sharp, and his near neighbours, the Walker family of Walterclough Hall. It is said she reflected the story in the plot of her novel Wuthering Heights and that the central character Heathcliff was based on Sharp himself. A plaque on the wall commemorates Brontë's stay between 1837 and 1838.

=== Ashday Hall ===
The present Ashday Hall was built by William Holdsworth in 1738. Ashday was one of the oldest settlements in the township of Southowram. Ashday is a comparatively modern form of the name of the estate, which was known as the manor of Astey or Astay, meaning "East - well watered land (ey - island of land surrounded by marshes)". William de Astey (also described as de Astay or Asty) witnessed numerous deeds recorded in the Court Rolls prior to 1284, especially of the Ecclesley family, located in Southowram township in the area later known as Far Exley or Exley Hall. In one of the deeds he is described as the son of William the Steward. His contemporary, Henry de Astey, son of Adam de Hastey, was a witness with him in one transaction. In another dated 23 May 1275 of which Henry de Astey was a party, William de Astey was a pledge.

== Industries ==
Local industries have included farming, mining for coal and fireclay, brick-manufacture, and stone quarrying and mining. With the exception of farming, and quarrying, which is continued by Marshalls plc, these industries are more or less defunct. Marshalls continues to extract stone in the area and the company has moved its headquarters to Huddersfield in recent years. However, the quarries at Brookfoot Lane remain open.

A number of walls which incorporate quarry waste can still be seen in the locality, especially those on the valley opposite Hove Edge. These walls include a rather splendid set of steps set into the side of the valley, which lead into a small narrow ginnel to permit passage along a public footpath.

== Religion ==
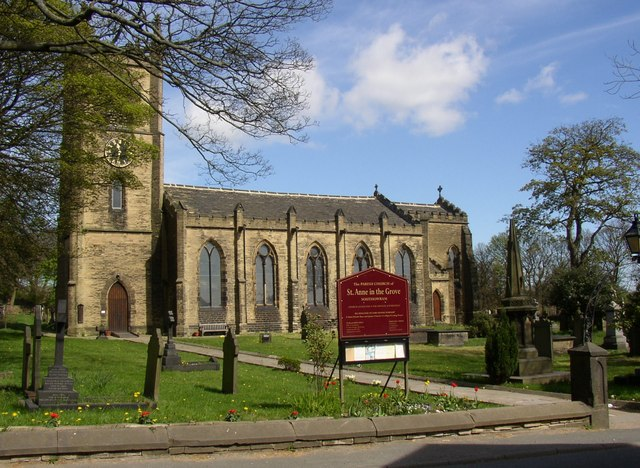
St Anne in the Grove Church

The Anglican church of St Anne's, situated below the village proper, surrounded by trees and fields, is an old stone-built church with a bell tower with a clock. It is the only remaining place of worship in the village and dates from the early 19th century. The legal name of the parish is "St Anne-in-the-Grove, Southowram". The church was restored in 2006 after a four-year appeal. It features a beautiful rood cross and icon as well as a gallery, a carved stone pulpit and some notable stained-glass windows. The church was originally part of a house belonging to the lord of the manor; in 1449 Pope Eugenius IV issued a licence for the Mass to be offered. Increased numbers led to the building of a new church on what is now Brookfoot Lane.

Various non-conformist chapels have closed over the years, most recent being Southowram Methodist Church, which was located at the lower end of Chapel Lane. The building has now been converted to apartments, but the graveyard survives. Although the Methodist chapel building has been closed the Methodist Church in Southowram continues to meet for worship and other activities in the village Community Centre. In 2010 Southowram Methodist Church combined with Boothtown Methodist and the name was changed to Boothtown and Southowram Methodist Church.

== Sport ==
Southowram is home to Southowram Cricket Club, who play at Ashday Lane, and Beacon Rangers who play on Beacon Hill. Beacon Rangers are a junior team only whereas the cricket club is home to three senior teams and U11, U13, U15 & U17 teams at junior level. All senior teams played in their respective premier divisions until the 2009 season, where all three senior teams were relegated. The club's first and second teams play in the Halifax Cricket League.

== Education and amenities ==
The local school, Withinfields Primary School, is in the centre of the village, on Law Lane and is a feeder school for Brighouse High School. The school was relocated and re-built in 1997 when the old school, being inadequate for modern needs, was demolished. The former school site is now part of a housing estate. The new school has been built so that it can easily be expanded if and when the village should expand.

There is a library on Law Lane at the centre of the village.

"The Shoulder of Mutton" on Cain Lane was a popular public house, currently empty. The Pack Horse public house, also on Cain Lane, at the centre of the village, was in 2016 converted to an Indian restaurant, but in 2017 reverted to a public house.

== Notable residents ==
- Arthur "Ashworth" Aspinall (1846–1929), founder of Scots College in Sydney, was born here.
- William Swinden Barber (1832–1908), architect, was born here.
