= Mount Tabor, West Yorkshire =

Hamlet in West Yorkshire, England

Coordinates: 53.741°N 1.920°W

Mount Tabor
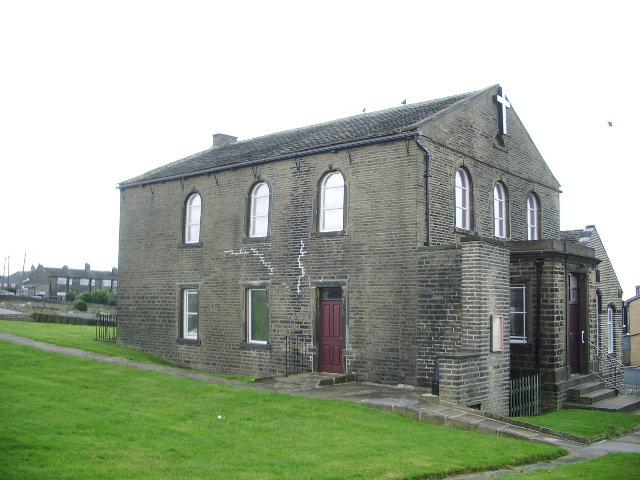
- Mount Tabor Methodist Church

- Location within West Yorkshire
- OS grid reference: SE052272
  - London: 170 mi (270 km) SE
- Metropolitan borough: Calderdale
- Metropolitan county: West Yorkshire
- Region: Yorkshire and the Humber
- Country: England
- Sovereign state: United Kingdom
- Post town: Halifax
- Postcode district: HX2
- Police: West Yorkshire
- Fire: West Yorkshire
- Ambulance: Yorkshire

Mount Tabor is a village in Calderdale, West Yorkshire, England, named after the biblical Battle of Mount Tabor mentioned in the Book of Judges. It is situated approximately 3 miles (5 km) north-west from Halifax town centre. The village is in the Warley ward of Calderdale.

The village is served by buses from Halifax bus station.

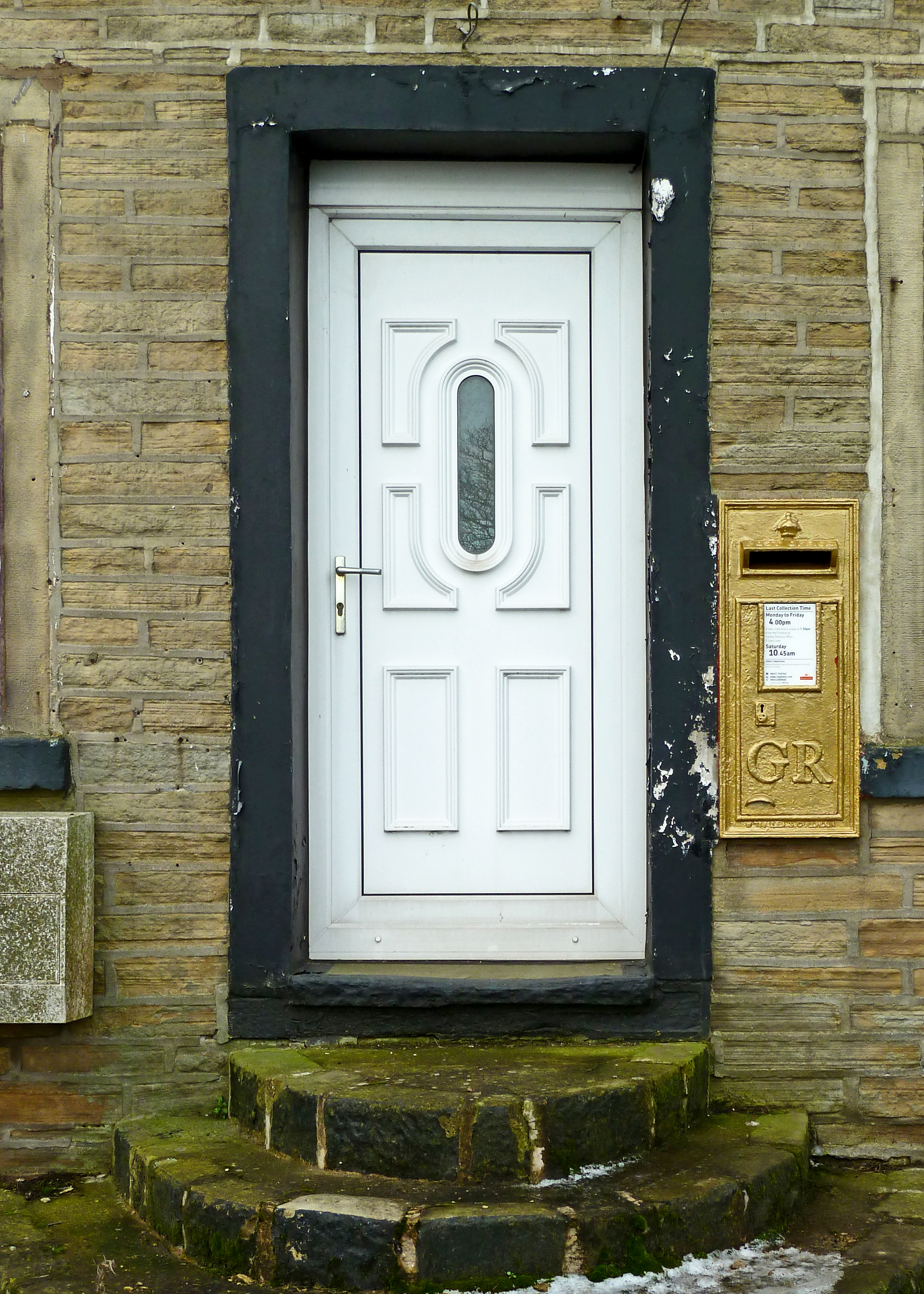
Hannah Cockroft's gold postbox

A post box in the village is painted gold, to commemorate one of Hannah Cockroft's 2012 Summer Paralympics gold medals.

The author Whiteley Turner lived in Mount Tabor.

== See also ==
- Listed buildings in Warley, West Yorkshire
