= Listed buildings in Warley, West Yorkshire =

Ward in Calderdale borough, West Yorkshire, England

Warley is a ward to the west and northwest of Halifax in the metropolitan borough of Calderdale, West Yorkshire, England. It contains 32 listed buildings that are recorded in the National Heritage List for England. All the listed buildings are designated at Grade II, the lowest of the three grades, which is applied to "buildings of national importance and special interest". The ward contains settlements including Warley Town, Mount Tabor, and Pellon, and the surrounding area. Most of the listed buildings are houses, cottages, farmhouses and farm buildings. Within the ward are the former Wellesley Barracks, and three structures associated it are listed. The other listed buildings include churches and associated structures, a former maltings, and a war memorial.

== Buildings ==
| Name and location | Photograph | Date | Notes |
|---|---|---|---|
| Spring Lea; 53.73930°N 1.90640°W | — | 1625 | The house, which was extended in the 18th century, is in stone with a stone roof. There are two storeys, and it consists of a main range and a gabled cross-wing to the east. On the front is a gabled two-storey porch with an arched doorway. In the cross-wing are mullioned and transomed windows, with mullioned windows elsewhere, and a tall stair window in the east return. |
| Haigh House; 53.72786°N 1.92493°W | — | 1631 | A stone house with a stone roof, two storeys and three bays. The rear of the house is set into the hillside. On the front is a two-storey gabled porch that has an arched doorway with a dated and initialled lintel. The windows are mullioned, and over the ground floor openings is a continuous hood mould. |
| Stock Lane House; 53.72296°N 1.90536°W | — | 1633 | The oldest part is the porch, with the rest of the house dating probably from the early 19th century. It is in stone with quoins, an eaves cornice, and a stone roof. There are two storeys and four bays. The porch has two storeys, and a shaped lintel with initials and the date. Above it is a blocked window with an inserted sundial, and the other windows are sashes. |
| Warley Edge Farmhouse; 53.72309°N 1.91192°W | — | 1633 | The farmhouse, which was rebuilt in 1903, is in stone with a stone roof. There are two storeys, and in the gabled south front is a long mullioned window in each floor. The east wing is gabled, and it contains a re-used arched lintel inscribed with initials and the date. The west wing has been converted from a barn and contains a long mullioned window. |
| Long Can; 53.73507°N 1.90034°W | | 1637 | The house was extended n the late 16th century and in 1708. It is in stone with quoins, a stone roof, two storeys, four bays, and a gabled cross-wing on the left. On the front is a two-storey gabled porch with a parapet and finials. The inner and outer doorways are arched, and the outer doorway has a moulded surround and a dated and initialled lintel. The windows are mullioned and have hood moulds. |
| Broadley Laith; 53.73501°N 1.90823°W | — | 17th century (probable) | A rendered stone cottage with a stone roof that has been altered. There are two storeys, most of the windows have retained their mullions, and those in the ground floor have hood moulds. |
| Grindlestone Bank Farmhouse; 53.74697°N 1.90919°W | — | 17th century (probable) | The farmhouse is in stone with quoins and a stone roof. There are two storeys, two gabled bays and a gabled cross-wing on the left. Between the bays is a two-storey gabled porch with an arched doorway. The windows are mullioned, and those in the ground floor also have transoms. |
| Newlands House and Farmhouse; 53.72339°N 1.92017°W | — | 17th century | The house was extended and partly rebuilt in the 19th century, and has been divided into two dwellings. It is in stone with a stone roof, and has two storeys. The older part has an irregular plan including a gabled east wing; here are some retained mullioned windows, and in the upper floor they also have transoms. The 19th-century wing has three bays and a verandah, and at the rear is an outshut. |
| Riding Farmhouse; 53.74104°N 1.90660°W | — | 17th century | The farmhouse probably incorporates earlier material, and has been much altered. It is in stone, mainly rendered, and has a stone roof. It consists of a single storey range flanked by two-storey, gabled cross-wings. The central range contains mullioned and transomed windows and two doorway with plain surrounds, and at the rear are mullioned windows. |
| South Clough Head; 53.72582°N 1.91950°W | — | 17th century | The house, which was later altered, extended to the north and divided, is in rendered stone with a stone roof. There are two storeys, and it contains original window openings with some mullions removed. |
| Warley Close; 53.72295°N 1.91251°W | — | 17th century (probable) | A stone house with a stone roof, there are two storeys at the front and one at the rear. In the south front are four mullioned windows, and in the east return is a circular window. |
| Warley Grange; 53.71943°N 1.91431°W | — | 17th century | A stone house with a stone roof and two storeys. Its windows are mullioned with hood moulds, and include two nine-light windows in the garden front, and a two-light fire window. The doorway has an arched head. At the rear is a gabled wing with an oculus in the gable. |
| Yew Trees; 53.73405°N 1.89901°W | — | 17th century | A rendered stone house with a stone roof. There are two storeys, three bays, and a lean-to at the rear. The doorway has a flat head, and the windows are mullioned with hood moulds. |
| 539–541 Gibbet Street; 53.72307°N 1.89766°W | | 1696 | Originally a Friends meeting house, later a private house, it is in sandstone with quoins of millstone grit and a roof of stone slate. There are two storeys, two bays, and a full length outshut on the front. The windows are mullioned, and the doorway in the left return has a massive lintel. |
| Lower Balkram Edge Farmhouse and outbuildings 53.74927°N 1.92120°W | — | 17th or early 18th century | The farmhouse and outbuildings are in stone with stone roofs. The farmhouse has two storeys, the openings have plain surrounds, and the windows are mullioned. The outbuildings to the right have a single storey. |
| Barn, Sunny Bank Farm; 53.74288°N 1.90979°W | — | 1708 | A stone barn with a stone roof and one storey. It has a gabled porch, and contains an arched doorway and mullioned windows. |
| Gibb Farmhouse; 53.74084°N 1.90870°W | — | 1715 | A stone farmhouse with quoins and a stone roof. There are two storeys and three bays. The doorway has a plain surround, and above it is a datestone. The windows are mullioned, and over the ground floor openings is a continuous hood mould, stepped over the doorway. |
| Cliff Hill; 53.71842°N 1.91355°W | — | 18th century (probable) | A large stone house with rusticated pilaster quoins, bracketed eaves, and a hipped stone roof. There are two storeys, a south front of five bays, and an east front of eleven bays. On the south front is a Doric porch, and the openings have plain surrounds. |
| The Wells; 53.72341°N 1.90227°W | | 18th century | A long stone house with an eaves cornice, a stone roof, two storeys and four bays. The three doorways have plain surrounds, and most of the windows are mullioned. In the left bay is a carriage arch with a Venetian window above. |
| Mount Tabor Methodist Church; 53.74159°N 1.92079°W | | 1820 | The church is in sandstone, and has a stone slate roof with coped gables. There are two storeys and a basement, a front of three bays with a pedimented gable, and an organ loft extension at the rear. The porch, which was added in about 1860, has a cornice and a blocking course, and contains a doorway with an architrave and a fanlight. The windows in the upper storey have round heads and keystones, in the lower storey and the basement they have flat heads, and in the gable apex is a lunette. |
| Sunday School to Moor End Chapel; 53.74898°N 1.91880°W | | 1821 | The Sunday school was enlarged in 1848 and later used as a chapel. It is in stone with a stone roof, and has a single storey and a three-bay gabled front facing the lane. The central doorway and the windows have plain surrounds. Above the doorway are two inscribed and dated plaques. and in the gable apex is a blocked oculus. |
| Mixenden Congregational Chapel; 53.74867°N 1.91795°W | — | 1836 | The chapel is in millstone grit, and has a stone slate roof with a pedimented gable. There are two storeys and a front of three bays. On the front is a central doorway with a cornice on consoles, and the windows have plain surrounds. There is a small annexe on the southeast with a sundial and an oval window. |
| Old Congregational Church; 53.71959°N 1.91460°W | | 1845 | The former church is built in sandstone and is in Tudor Gothic style. The entrance front has three bays, the middle bay flanked by octagonal turrets with embattled parapets. The doorway has a four-centred arch, and above it is a tall three-light mullioned and transomed window with a four-centred arch and a hood mould. Over this is a gable with pierced balustraded coping containing a clock face. The outer bays contain tall windows with chamfered surrounds and four-centred arched heads, and at the top is an embattled parapet. |
| Wall and gate piers, Old Congregational Church; 53.71973°N 1.91441°W | — | c. 1845 | The wall enclosing the churchyard is in stone, it is coped, and carries railings. The gate piers are in stone with an octagonal plan, and each pier has an embattled top and a wrought iron finial. Between the piers are gates with crescents and spearheads, and an overthrow with scrollwork and a lantern. |
| Christ Church, Pellon; 53.73081°N 1.88889°W | | 1853–54 | The church, which was extended in 1902–03, is in sandstone with dressings in freestone and a slate roof, and is in Decorated style. It consists of a nave, a north aisle, a northwest porch, a chancel with a north vestry and chapel, a south organ chamber, and a southwest tower. The tower has three stages, with angle buttresses, a porch in the lowest stage, clock faces in the south and west sides, and an embattled parapet. |
| Commanding Officer's House, Wellesley Barracks; 53.72399°N 1.89463°W | — | 1875 | The house, later an office, is in stone on a plinth, with quoins, and a slate roof with coped gables and kneelers. There are two storeys and a gabled wing on the right. The central doorway has a hood with a segmental top on wooden brackets. Above it is a single window, and the other windows are sashes with segmental heads. |
| Keep, Wellesley Barracks; 53.72301°N 1.89325°W | | 1875 | The armoury, guard house and store for the former barracks is in stone with bands, dentil eaves, and an embattled parapet. It has a square plan, three storeys, and sides of three bays. At two corners are square towers rising higher than the roof, and the other corners are chamfered with raised parapets. The windows have metal frames and stone lintels, and in the tower they are stepped. |
| Officers' Mess, Wellesley Barracks; 53.72361°N 1.89471°W | — | 1875 | The officers' mess, later offices, is in stone on a chamfered plinth, with quoins, and slate roofs with coped gables and kneelers. It is in Gothic Revival style, and has two storeys and an irregular plan. The porch has pointed arches on circular columns with foliate capitals and a hipped roof, and the inner doorway has a chamfered surround. The windows vary; some are sashes, and other are cross windows with mullions. |
| Perimeter wall and gates, Wellesley Barracks; 53.72291°N 1.89369°W | — | 1875 | The perimeter wall is in stone with rounded coping and is 3 metres (9.8 ft) high. The entrance is flanked by two sentry boxes in stone on a chamfered plinth. These have a half-octagonal plan, moulded coping, and a gun slit on each outer face. Inside, steps lead up to a platform. |
| St John's Church, Warley; 53.72083°N 1.90246°W | | 1877–78 | The church is in sandstone with dressings in freestone and a slate roof, and is in Early English style. It consists of a nave, a south aisle, a chancel with a south vestry and organ chamber, and a southwest tower. The tower has three stages, with angle buttresses, a porch in the lowest stage, a northwest turret, clock faces in the middle stage, and a corbelled embattled parapet with crocketed pinnacles. |
| The Maltings, Fountain Head Brewery; 53.73767°N 1.90037°W | | 1900 | The maltings, later converted into offices, is in sandstone with a Welsh slate roof. The central block has eight bays, four storeys and three attic storeys. It contains segmental-headed windows, in the attic storeys are three tiers of triangular dormers, and on the roof are two wooden hoists. At the east end is a single-bay seven-storey hoist tower, and a two-bay tower that contains a three-storey train entrance, above which is a swept hipped roof with a slate-hung louvre. At the west end is a block with three storeys and sides of six and three bays, with pilasters and twin swept hipped roofs with louvres. |
| South African War Memorial; 53.72078°N 1.89576°W | | 1904 | The memorial to the Boer War stands in West View Park. It consists of a square stone plinth with bronze tablets on four steps. On the plinth is a decorative pedestal, a circular drum of polished granite, and a stone frieze depicting cavalry, and this surmounted by the bronze figure of a standing soldier. |
