= Whiteley Turner =

English mill worker, shopkeeper and author

- Born: 1866; Sowerby, Yorkshire, England
- Died: 20 February 1921 (age 55)
- Resting place: Wesleyan chapel yard, Mount Tabor, Yorkshire
- Education: Luddenden National School
- Occupations: Mill worker; Shopkeeper; Newsagent
- Notable work: A Spring-Time Saunter

Whiteley Turner (1866 – 20 February 1921) was an English mill worker, shopkeeper and author.

Turner was born in Sowerby, Yorkshire, the third son of Robert, a wool sorter, and Elizabeth Turner. At the age of eight, he was sent to work at Peel House Mills. Four years later, he moved to Solomon Priestley's woolen mill. There, he lost his right arm in an industrial accident, when his sleeve was caught in a carding machine and the limb was wrenched off at the shoulder. As a result, he lost his job.

He was subsequently able to attend Luddenden National School as a free scholar, and then began selling newspapers and tea, which he delivered to his customers on foot. He kept a shop at Mount Tabor.

In 1895, he began to write articles describing his local walks for the Halifax Courier. From 1904 to 1907, the newspaper serialised his A Spring-Time Saunter, about a four-day ramble from his home at Mount Tabor, over the Pennine Moors, to Haworth, taking in such features as Fly Flat Reservoir, Castle Carr and Brontë Waterfalls. By popular demand, this was published in revised form as a book, A Spring-Time Saunter: Round and About Bronte Land, illustrated by Arthur Comfort, in 1913. The book includes first-hand recollections from people who knew the Brontë family.

There were several editions. The first, a subscribers' edition, had 2,000 copies. The second had 1,000, and the third, in 1915, 3,000. However, the latter initially failed to sell, due to the outbreak of World War I. Eventually, copies were circulated to wounded soldiers from Yorkshire, paid for by the Courier Comforts Fund, and the edition sold out. A further, paperback, edition was published in 1986.

The book was described by The Courier in 2007 as "a local publishing legend".

Turner is buried in Wesleyan chapel yard at Mount Tabor.

== Bibliography ==
- —— (1913). A Spring-Time Saunter: Round and About Bronte Land.
  - —— (1986). A Spring-Time Saunter: Round and About Bronte Land. M.T.D. Rigg Publications. ISBN 978-0950919188.
