= 76th Regiment of Foot =

- 1874–1881 regimental glengarry badge for other ranks
- Active: 1787–1881
- Country: Great Britain (1787–1800); United Kingdom (1801–1881)
- Branch: British Army
- Type: Infantry
- Role: Line infantry
- Size: One battalion
- Garrison/HQ: Wellesley Barracks, Halifax
- Nicknames: The Immortals; The Pigs; The Old Seven and Sixpennies
- Colors: Red facings
- March: Quick: "Scotland the Brave"; Slow: "Logie o'Buchan"
- Engagements: Third Anglo-Mysore War; Second Anglo-Maratha War; Napoleonic Wars; War of 1812

The 76th Regiment of Foot was a line infantry regiment of the British Army. Raised in England in 1787 for service in British India, the regiment was sent there in 1788 and served in the Third Anglo-Mysore War and Second Anglo-Maratha War. It returned to England in 1806 and was renamed in the same year as the 76th (Hindoostan) Regiment of Foot, garrisoning Jersey from 1807 to 1808. The regiment was sent to Spain in 1809 to serve in the Peninsular War but returned to England in the same year and took part in the Walcheren Campaign. In 1812 the regiment reverted to its original name and was sent back to the Iberian Peninsula in 1813 to once again serve in the Peninsular War.

The regiment was sent to North America in 1814 to serve in the War of 1812. In 1827 the regiment returned to Europe from North America and garrisoned Ireland until 1834, when it was sent to the West Indies. The regiment was sent to Bermuda in 1840 and Canada in 1841 before returning to England in 1842. In 1848 it was sent to Corfu before being redeployed to Malta in 1850 and New Brunswick in 1853, again returning to England in 1857. The regiment was sent to India in 1863 and once again returned to England in 1876. Under the Childers Reforms it was amalgamated with the 33rd (Duke of Wellington's) Regiment of Foot to form the Duke of Wellington's Regiment in 1881.

== History ==
=== Formation ===
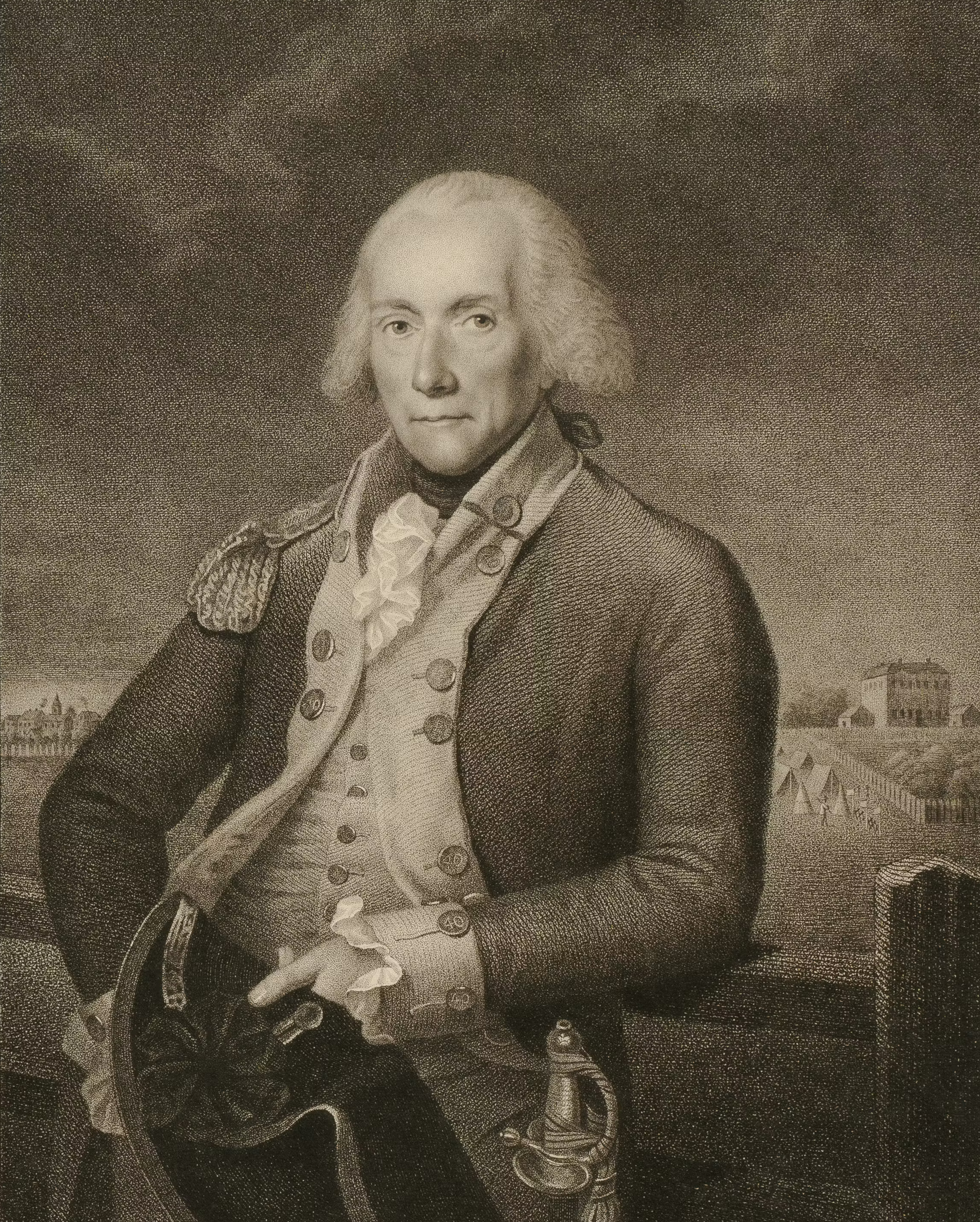
Sir Thomas Musgrave, the regimental founder

The regiment was raised by Sir Thomas Musgrave, 7th Baronet for service in British India as the 76th Regiment of Foot in October 1787. In accordance with the Declaratory Act 1788 the cost of raising the regiment was recharged to East India Company on the basis that the act required that expenses "should be defrayed out of the revenues" arising there. The majority of recruits were raised from Nottingham and Leicestershire, but many of them also came from the Musgrave family estates around Hayton Castle, near Aspatria, Cumbria. In 1787 Lieutenant Colonel George Harris joined the regiment.

The Royal Warrant for their raising was issued on 12 October 1787 and read:

GEORGE R.
Whereas We have thought fit to order a Regt of Foot to be
forthwith raised under your Command, which is to consist of ten
Companies, with 3 Sergts, 4 Corpls, 2 Drumrs & 71 private Men
in each, with two Fifers to the Grenadier Compy and one
Compy, of 8 Sergts, 8 Corpls, 4 Drumrs & 30 private Men with
the usuals Comd. Officers, these are to authorise you by Beat of
Drum or otherwise to raise so many Men in any Country or part
of our Kingdom of Great Britain as shall be wanted to complete
the said Regt, to the above mentioned numbers. And all above
Given the 12th October. 1787 in the 27th Year of Our Reign.
By H.M.'s Command (Sd.) Geo. Yonge

=== India ===
Regimental grenadiers at the Battle of Arakere

The regiment embarked for India in 1788 and participated in the Third Anglo-Mysore War, which broke out in 1789, serving in the siege of Bangalore in early 1791, the Battle of Arakere on 15 May 1791 and the siege of Seringapatam in February 1792. The regiment also in the Second Anglo-Maratha War following its outbreak in 1803 and participated in the siege of Aligarh in September of that year. The regiment went on to fight at the Battle of Delhi on 11 September 1803, the Battle of Laswari on 1 November 1803 and the Battle of Deeg on 13 November 1804. For their distinguished service in these battles George III authorised the regiment to have the word "Hindoostan" along with an elephant badge with a howdah inscribed with the same word to be emblazoned on the regimental colours. The regiment returned to England in 1806 and was renamed the 76th (Hindoostan) Regiment of Foot in October of that year.

=== Napoleonic Wars ===
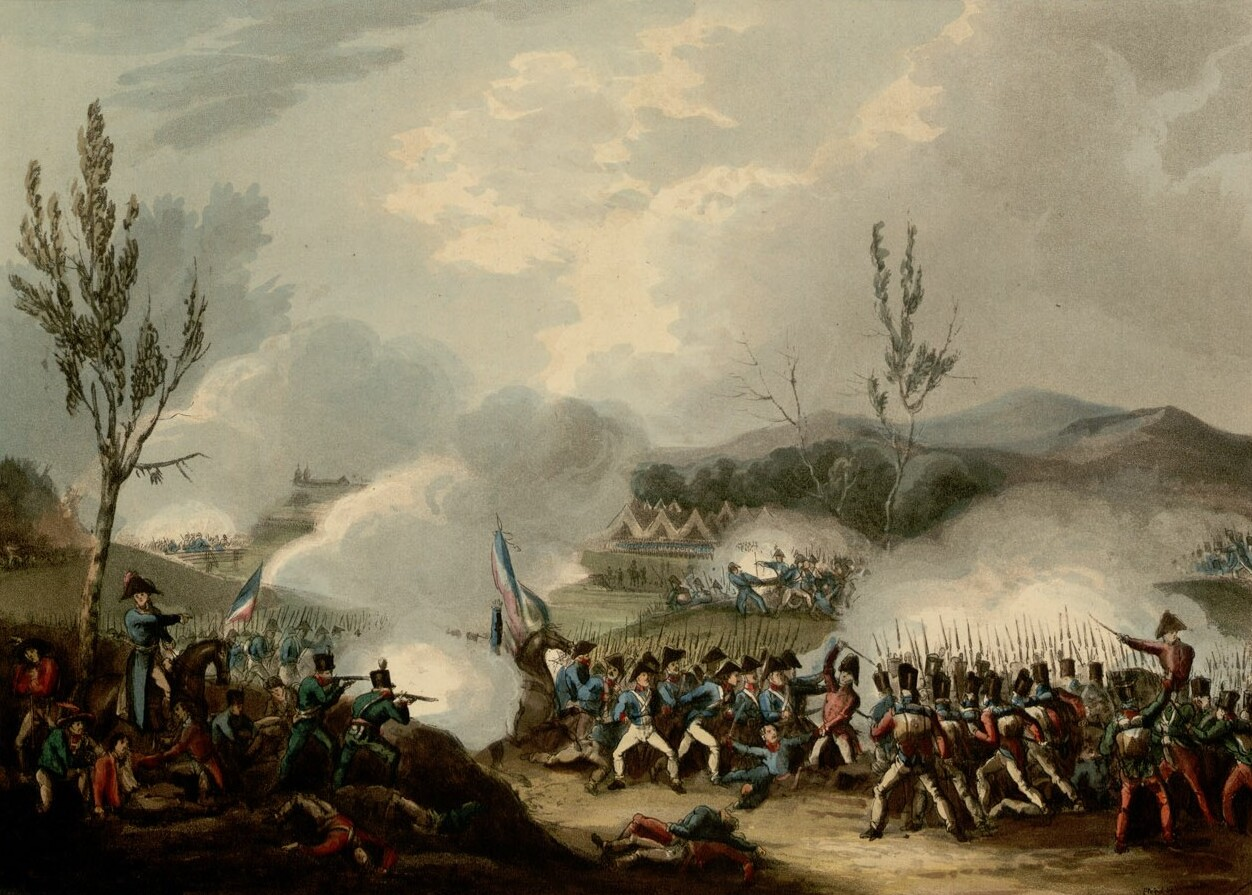
The Battle of the Nive, which the regiment fought in

In 1807, the regiment was deployed to Jersey in the Channel Islands for garrison duty, remaining there until 1808, when it was deployed to Spain to take part in the Peninsular War. The regiment took part in the Battle of Corunna in January 1809 and was evacuated from the Peninsula later that month. The regiment took part in the disastrous Walcheren Campaign in autumn 1809 and, having reverted to the title of 76th Regiment of Foot in 1812, returned to the Peninsula in 1813 seeing action at the Battle of Nivelle in November 1813 and the Battle of the Nive in December 1813. It then embarked for North America for service in the War of 1812 and saw action at the Battle of Plattsburgh in September 1814.

=== Victorian era ===
Various regimental uniforms

The regiment did not return from North America until 1827. It was garrisoned in Ireland until 1834 when it departed for the West Indies. The regiment was posted to the Garrison of the Imperial fortress colony of Bermuda, part of British North America, from 20 May 1840, until 9 November 1841, and on to Canada in 1841 before returning home in 1842. The regiment were deployed to South Wales later in the year to help suppress the Rebecca Riots. After that the regiment went to Corfu in 1848 and on to Malta in 1850 before sailing for Saint John, New Brunswick in March 1853. It was garrisoned at Fredericton in New Brunswick before embarking for home again in September 1857. It embarked for India in September 1863 and was stationed in Fort St. George, Madras before moving on to Burma in January 1868, returning to India again in 1870 and sailing for England in 1876.

As part of the Cardwell Reforms of the 1870s, where single-battalion regiments were linked together to share a single depot and recruiting district in the United Kingdom, the 76th was linked with the 33rd (Duke of Wellington's) Regiment, and assigned to district no. 9 at Wellesley Barracks in Halifax. On 1 July 1881 the Childers Reforms came into effect and the regiment amalgamated with the 33rd (Duke of Wellington's) Regiment to form the Duke of Wellington's Regiment.

== Battle honours ==
The regiment's battle honours were:

- Hindoostan
- Peninsular War: Nive, Peninsula

== Colonels ==
Colonels of the Regiments were:

76th Regiment of Foot (1787); 76th (Hindoostan) Regiment of Foot (1806)

- 1787–1812: Gen. Sir Thomas Musgrave, 7th Baronet

76th Regiment of Foot (1812)

- 1813–1814: Lt.-Gen. Sir George Prevost
- 1814–1834: Lt-Gen Christopher Chowne
- 1834–1836: Gen. Sir Peregrine Maitland, GCB
- 1843: Lt-Gen. George Middlemore, CB
- 1843–1853: Lt-Gen. Sir Robert Arbuthnot, KCB
- 1853–1862: Gen. William Jervois, KH
- 1862–1871: Lt-Gen. Joseph Clarke
- 1871–1875: Lt-Gen. Matthew Smith
- 1875–1881: Gen. Frederick Darley George, CB
- 1881: Regiment amalgamated with 33rd (Duke of Wellington's) Regiment of Foot as the second battalion

== Sources ==
- Brereton, J.M.; Savory, A.C.S. (1993). History of the Duke of Wellington's Regiment. Duke of Wellington's Regiment. ISBN 0-9521552-0-6.
- Hayden, Frederick Arthur (1908). Historical Record of the 76th "Hindoostan" Regiment from Its Formation in 1787 to 30th June 1881. Spine title:Historical records Seventy-sixth "Hindoostan" Regiment. Johnson's Head.
- Thackeray, William Makepeace (2013). The Tremendous Adventures of Major Gahagan Chapter 2. CreateSpace. ISBN 978-1490979120. Archived from the original on 23 June 2007.
