= Milefortlet 10 =

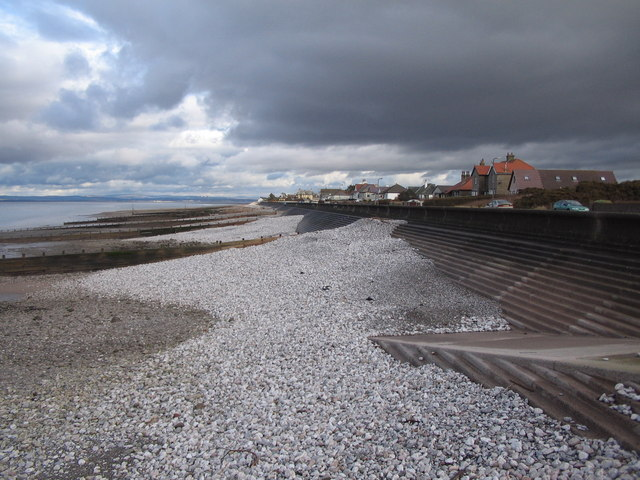
- Milefortlet 10 probably lay by the coast between Skinburness and Silloth

- Location within the former Allerdale Borough Location within Cumbria
- 54.883801°N 3.375039°W
- Type: Milecastle
- Location: Cumbria, England

Milefortlet 10 (East Cote) is conjectured to have been a Milefortlet of the Roman Cumbrian Coast defences, however no physical evidence exists to positively prove its existence. The site was identified based on measurement from other Hadrianic defensive structures on the Cumbria coast. These defences were contemporary with defensive structures on Hadrian's Wall.

== Construction ==
Nothing is known of the construction details for Milefortlet 10. It is possible that the remains were lost to coastal erosion following the 1855 construction of the pier at Silloth.

== Excavations and investigations ==
- 1949 - The site was visited by J. K. St Joseph.
- 1955 - English Heritage Field Investigation. A slight bank 0.2m high, with evidence of a rounded corner was noted but not surveyed.
- 1991 - Trenches were dug at the supposed site. These revealed a series of natural sand deposits representing dune formation, probably of two phases separated by flood-borne gravel. It was noted that the platform previously observed is a truncated dune similar to several others in the locale.
- 1992 - The site was built over. No remains were found.

== Associated Towers ==
Each milefortlet had two associated towers, similar in construction to the turrets built along Hadrian's Wall. These towers were positioned approximately one-third and two-thirds of a Roman mile to the west of the Milefortlet, and would probably have been manned by part of the nearest Milefortlet's garrison. The towers associated with Milefortlet 10 are known as Tower 10A and Tower 10B.

=== Tower 10A ===
Tower 10A has never been located. The position is conjectured based on measurement from known Milefortlets and towers. The site (adjacent to Skinburness Drive) has been built on, and no evidence of a structure exists.
Measured location of site: 54.879714°N 3.378797°W

=== Tower 10B ===
Tower 10B has never been located. The position is conjectured based on measurement from known Milefortlets and towers. An English Heritage Field Investigation in 1993 noted that the site was located beneath private gardens and that no trace of a structure could be seen on the ground.
Measured location of site: 54.875808°N 3.382404°W

== Monument Records ==
Monument	Monument Number	National Monuments Record Number
Milefortlet 10	9627	NY 15 NW 3
Tower 10A	9677	NY 15 SW 11
Tower 10B	9678	NY 15 SW 12
