= St Mark's Church, Huddersfield =

Church of St Mark, Old Leeds Road
- Former Church of St Mark, Old Leeds Road, Huddersfield
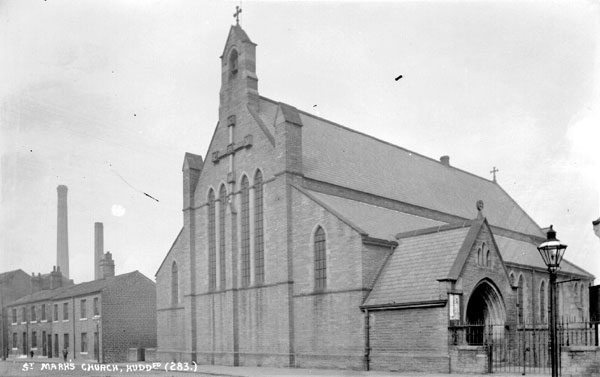
- St Mark's, before 1907

- Location within West Yorkshire
- 53°38′58″N 1°46′35″W
- OS grid reference: SE148170
- Location: Huddersfield, West Yorkshire
- Country: England
- Denomination: Church of England
- Churchmanship: Central

History
- Status: former church
- Founded: 15 May 1886
- Dedication: Mark the Evangelist
- Dedicated: 27 September 1887
- Consecrated: 27 September 1887

Architecture
- Functional status: Defunct
- Heritage designation: Unlisted
- Architect: William Swinden Barber
- Architectural type: Mission church
- Style: Gothic Revival architecture

Administration
- Parish: Formerly St Mark's, Huddersfield

The former St Mark's Church, Old Leeds Road, Huddersfield, was an Anglican parish church in West Yorkshire, England. It was previously known as St Mark's, Leeds Road, before the road name was changed. ("Leeds Road" differentiates this building from St. Mark the Evangelist, Longwood, Huddersfield.) This building was designed in 1886 by William Swinden Barber when the parish of St Peter's was split and a new building was required to accommodate a growing congregation. It was opened in 1887. Among the vicars posted in this benefice were the very popular Canon Percy Holbrook, the notoriously unfortunate Reverend Jonas Pilling who was involved in a standoff with his congregation for many years, the sociable Reverend Robert Alfred Humble who died in mysterious circumstances, and the eloquent preacher Reverend Joseph Miller, who had previously been a Congregational minister. The building was sold by the Church of England in 2001, and it has been converted into a block of offices.

== Foundation stone ceremony ==
The cornerstone was laid in the afternoon of Saturday 15 May 1886. There had been bad weather during the previous week, and the ceremony was performed before a "considerable" crowd under a large tent in a high wind, although the rain had abated. The silver trowel had an ivory handle and a Morocco case lined with silk. The blade was engraved thus:

"Presented to Mrs William Brooke, on the occasion of her laying the foundation stone of St Mark's Church, Leeds-Road, Huddersfield, Saturday May 15th, 1886, by W. Swinden Barber, architect, James W. Bardsley, vicar of Huddersfield and chairman of the Building Committee; Edward Armitage, treasurer; and George Fisher, secretary."

The mallet "was made of polished rosewood, and was beautifully finished. Round the top of the head a suitable inscription was engraved on two circles of silver." These circles were engraved, "Presented by William Henry Jessop to Mrs William Brooks, Northgate Mount, May 15th, 1886," and "St Mark's Church, Huddersfield." Chief among those present at the ceremony were Mr William Brooke JP, and his wife. Heading the list of surpliced clerics were the Reverends J. Wareing Bardsley MA vicar and Rural Dean of Huddersfield, and John Dunbar, vicar-designate of St Mark's, and the choir led by Mr Fowles. They were accompanied by sixteen other clerics, plus J.F. Richards, headmaster of Huddersfield College, three justices of the peace, a number of local personages and the building contractors. Last on the list was T.H. Farrar, managing clerk for the architect who was not present on that day.

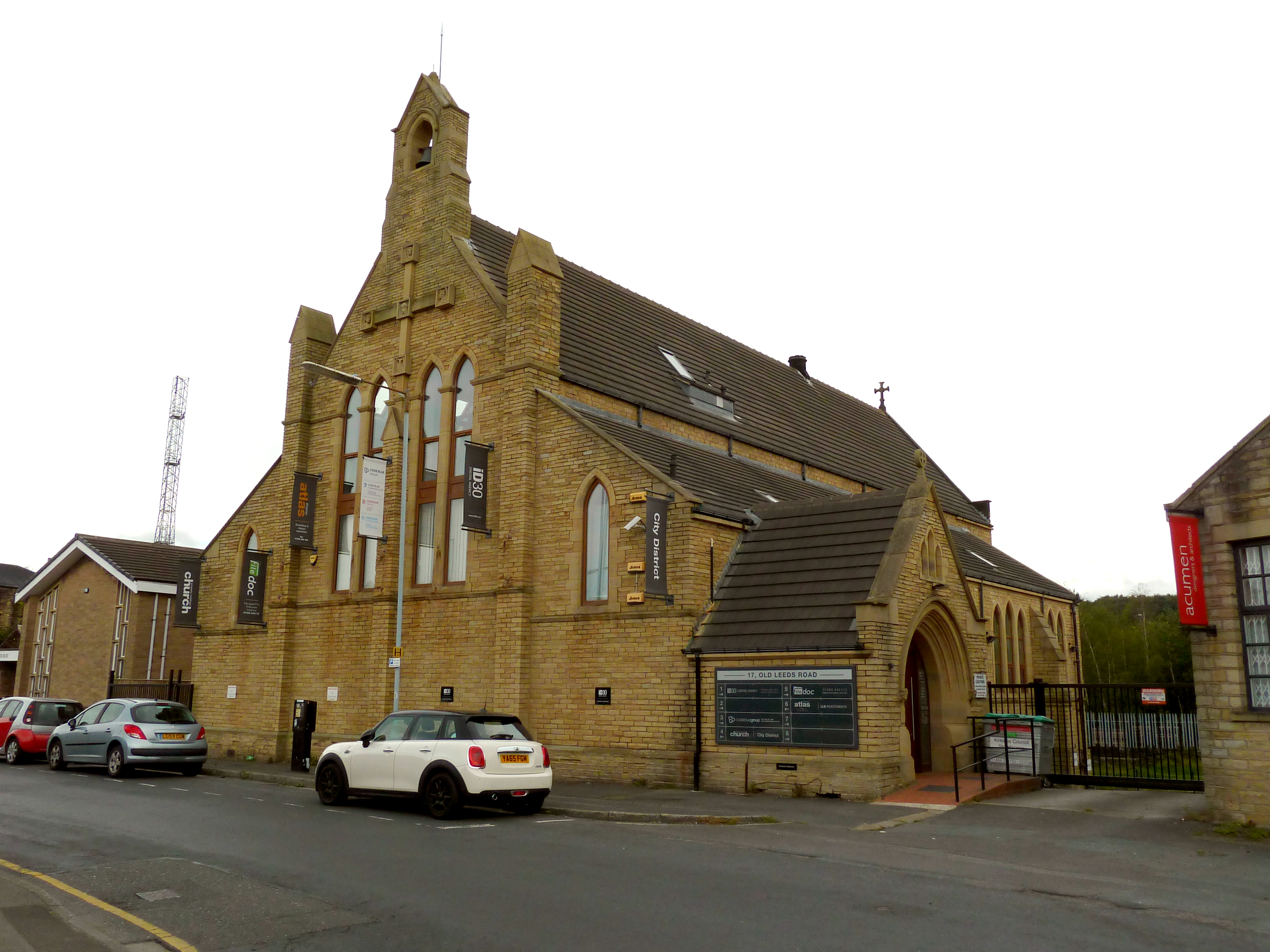
The church in 2016

The hymn, This stone to thee in faith we lay, was sung, and in his sermon Rev. J.W. Bardsley spoke about the way in which the mass movement of people to cities had had a consequence in which "large numbers of the people of England had grown up in habits of non-attendance in the House of God," and this had caused the Church of England to split city parishes and build more churches. He said that in the 1881 Census the population of the Huddersfield parish was 9,201, and that number had increased greatly since the Census. Moreover, the Parish Church had only 500 free seats. This was the reason why the parish had been split, and St Mark's built as an extra church, on land given by Sir John Ramsden. He said that poorer people had "collected considerable sums of money by means of collecting cards." He told the parish congregation that they must raise sufficient funds for the remaining building work, and for an endowment as well. They then sang, Christ is our corner stone. The collection was £42 1s 1d. The treasurer Mr E. Armitage said that they had been promised subscriptions of about £4,800, but that they needed £6,000 to cover the endowment. They had incurred liabilities of around £4,000, and they needed another £1,200. They had received nearly £3,700 in hard cash, but they had had to buy out the leaseholder of the land that they'd been given. So the congregation was constrained, in an area of much poverty, to raise more funds.

A time capsule in the form of a bottle was placed in a cavity in the corner stone. It contained "copies of that day's Times, the local newspapers, current coins of the realm, and a copy of the description of the church, with the names of the architect and the contractors." The stone was then laid by Mrs Brooke, and the audience cheered. There were long speeches by G.L. Batley, F.W. Bradon, William Brooke, and Colonel Brooke. The event ended with the National Anthem and the Doxology, and – unusually for these events – no mention of a meal provided for guests.

== Consecration ==
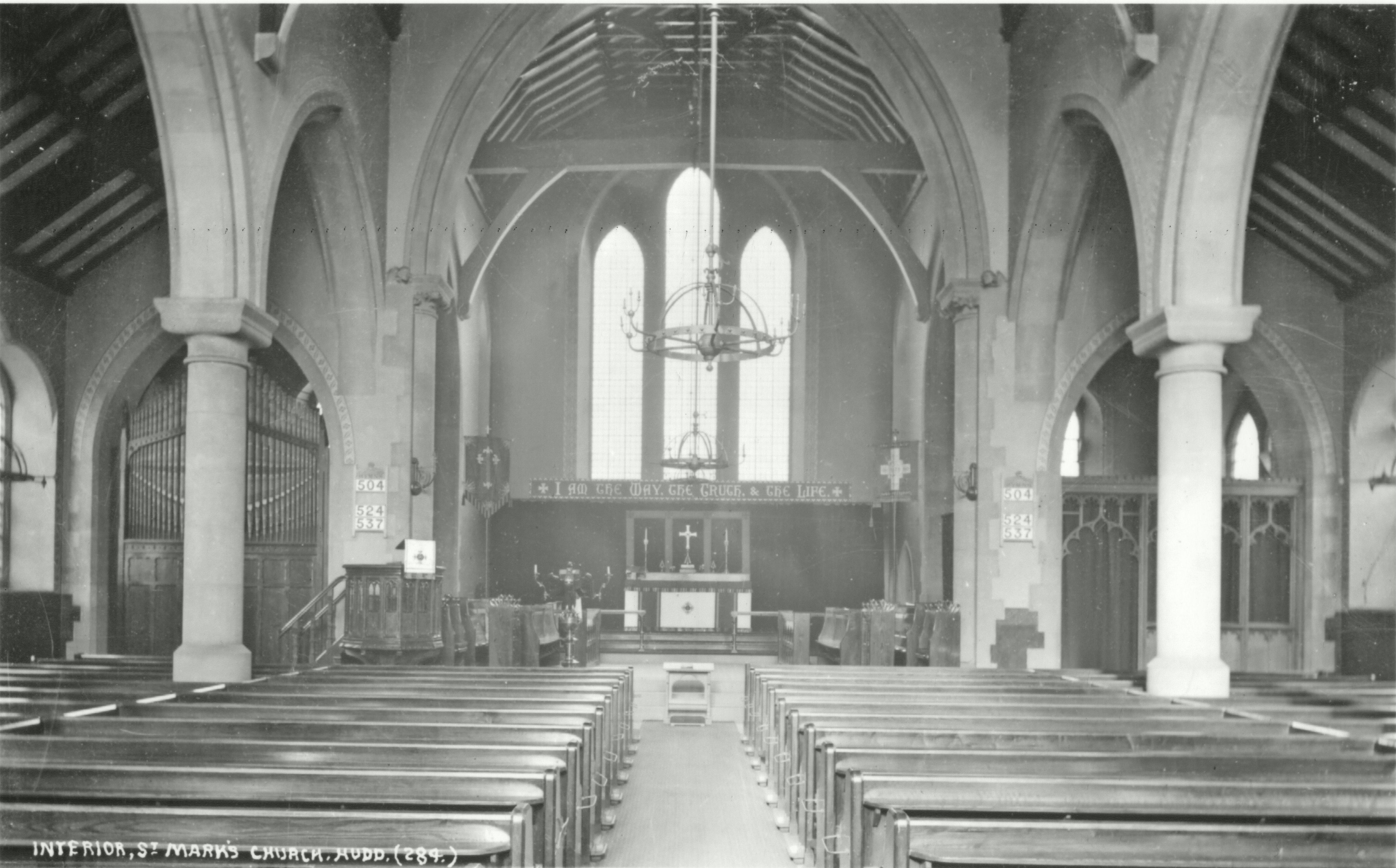
Interior before 1907

The building was consecrated in front of a large congregation at 10.30 am on Tuesday 27 September 1887, by William Boyd Carpenter, Bishop of Ripon. The bishop "was accompanied by the majority of the clergy [all surpliced] in the rural deanery, and a procession was formed proceeding up the middle aisle of the church to the chancel." The procession included 33 clerics, headed by the Bishop, Rev. J.W. Bardsley vicar of Huddersfield, and Rev. J. Dunbar vicar-designate of St Mark's. Last in the procession were thirteen members of the building committee: John Beaumont, John Barnicott, William Brooke, Isaac Hordern, Sharples Fisher, Peter Conacher, G.L. Batley, A. Armitage, Dr Foster, G.G. Fisher, G.H. Hart, churchwarden H. Kilner, and churchwarden J.J. Booth.

After they were seated, the commissary of the diocese read the deed of conveyance which was signed by the Bishop, who then delivered the consecration prayers. There was then a morning service, prayers and lessons, and a communion service. The choir, choirmaster and organist were supplied by the Parish Church. The choir sang the Venite, Te Deum and Jubilate, and Psalms 84, 122 and 132. The congregation joined in with the hymns Christ is our corner stone, We love the place, O God, and Pour out thy spirit from on high. Bearing in mind that the local population was very poor and had had little opportunity in their lives to attend church, the Bishop's sermon was based on Second Epistle to the Corinthians 4:18: "We look not at the things which are seen, but at the things which are not seen, for the things which are seen are temporal, and the things which are not seen are eternal," and he spoke at length about life after death and Jesus' work with the poor. Psalm 100 was sung, and the collection made £201 4s 11d.

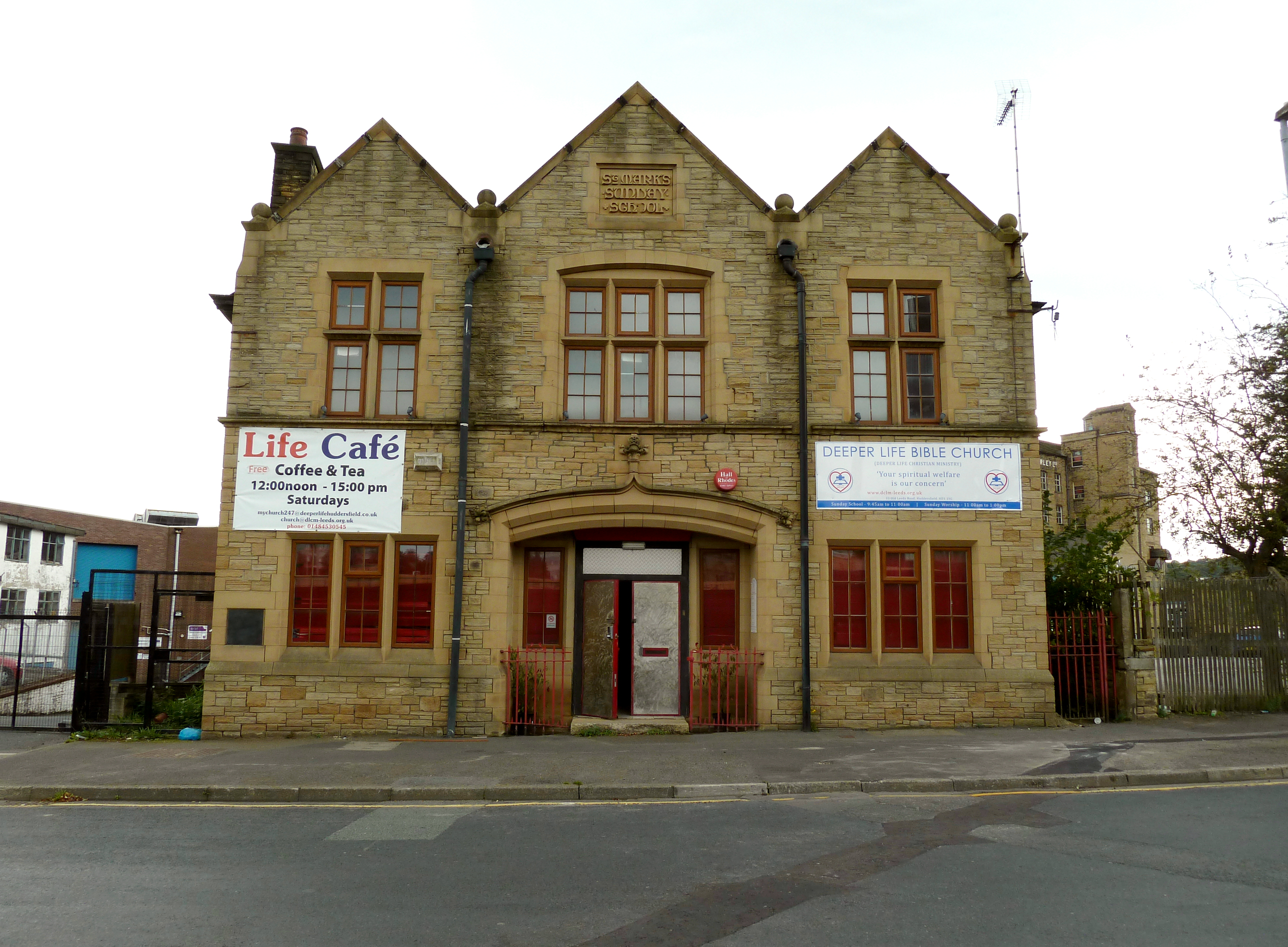
St Mark's Sunday school was built following the consecration

The Huddersfield Chronicle described "an excellent and substantial luncheon" which the vicar had arranged in the Parish Church Schools, and which were very well attended by clergy and laity, and evidently at least one journalist. There were many toasts, and speeches by the chairman Rev. J.W. Bardsley, the bishop, Mr J.A. Brooke, Rev E. Snowden, Rev J.W. Town, W.H. Barber, W.H. Jessop, and Rev. P.F.J. Pearce. During the speeches it was noted that 1887 was the year of Victoria's jubilee, and that the new Diocese of Wakefield was about to take over the parish. It was also mentioned that several nonconformists had contributed to the funding of St Mark's. Bardsey said that the estimated cost of the building was at that time £4,024, and that they had raised subscriptions totalling more than £5,430, including money from some very poor local people. Moreover, the Ecclesiastical Commissioners had promised £1,000 to meet a future £1,000 raised by St Mark's parish. He listed a number of gifts, including vestry furniture and communion plate, showing that this church was fully furnished on consecration day. Barber the architect was toasted, and replied that "the church was extremely plain and might be much improved by colouring and stained glass, but he supposed such matters must be left open for future consideration." Rev. Pearce recommended the building of a new church school premises near St Mark's, and noted that there was not yet a vicarage for Rev. Dunbar. This was to be built later. Although the congregation left the luncheon well fed and watered, there was good attendance at the evening service, when the collection raised £11 9s.

== Structure ==
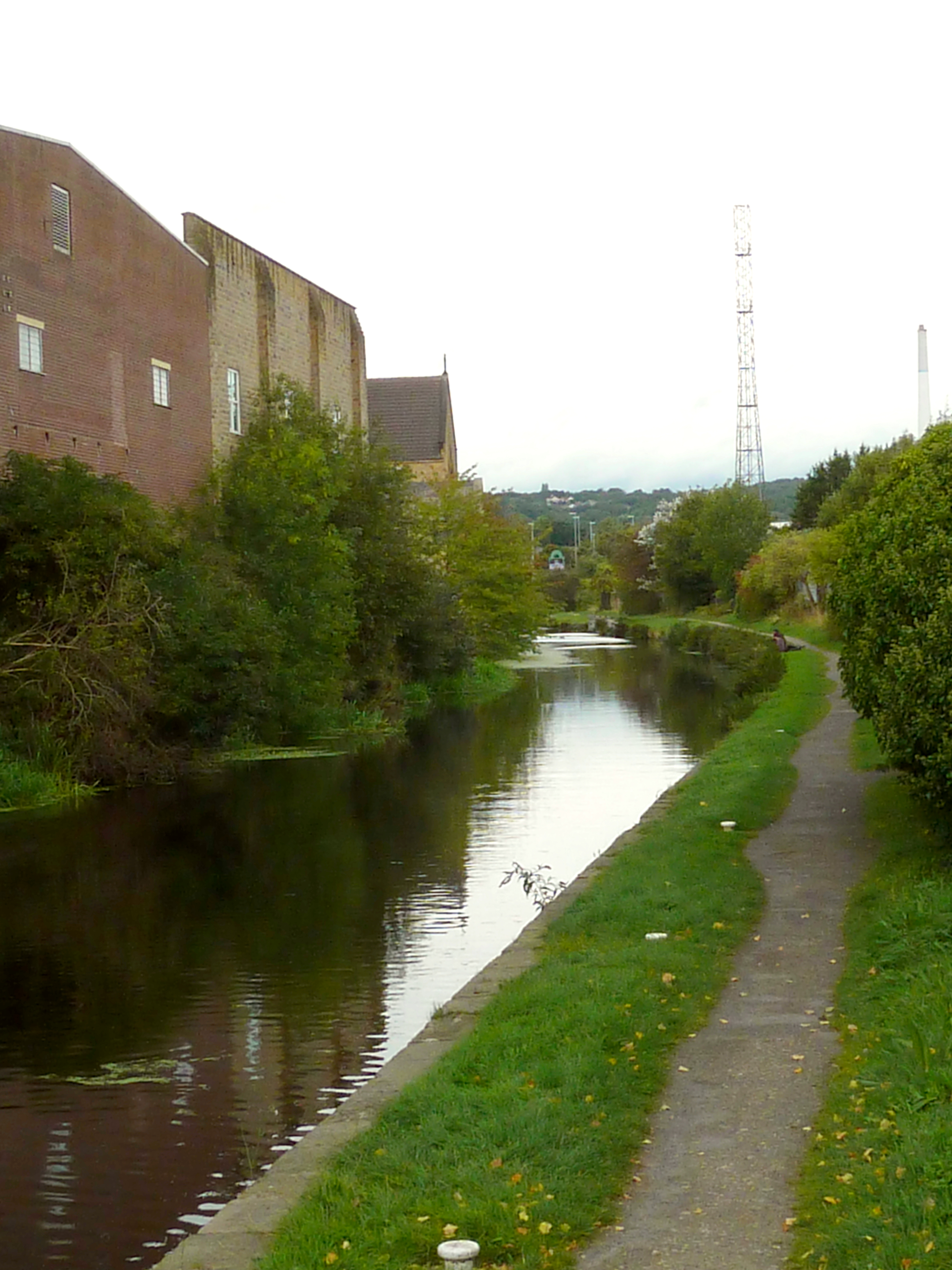
This stretch of canal was emptied to allow building of foundations

In the face of limited funds and a large congregation to be roofed over, the building was designed to be as plain as possible. Therefore, a mission-church style was chosen, having no clerestory, and with plain detail. The building occupied all of the available ground from west to east, leaving only a narrow margin between it and the canal. The Huddersfield Chronicle described the west end of the building:

"The principal external feature is the west elevation which abuts on the Leeds Road, and whatever interest may attach to it is due rather to outline than to any elaboration of detail. A central buttress of slight projection separates the long two-light windows, and from this buttress there rises a bold cross built into the wall, the termination of the arms being formed of blocks on which are to be carved the emblems of the evangelists, the main gable being crowned with a plain bell turret."

In the event, by 1887 the centre block in the cross carried an image of a suffering Jesus, and the bell turret carried a bell made by Mears & Stainbank. Due to its proximity with Huddersfield Broad Canal, the foundations of the east wall were deep and made of concrete. The canal company's engineer had to draw off the canal water twice during the building's groundwork, before the foundation stone was laid.

== Interior ==
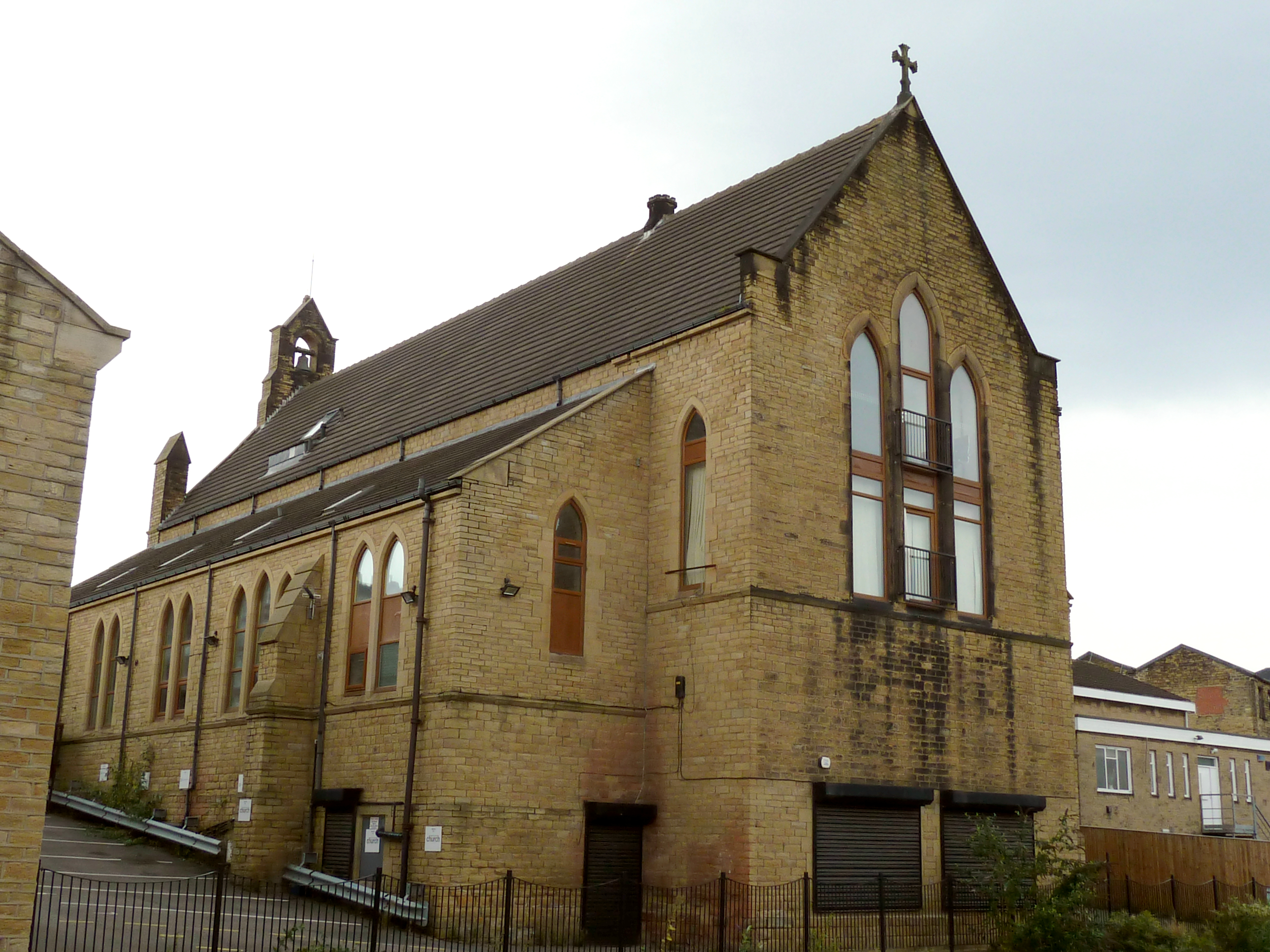
The undercroft vestry level is visible from outside

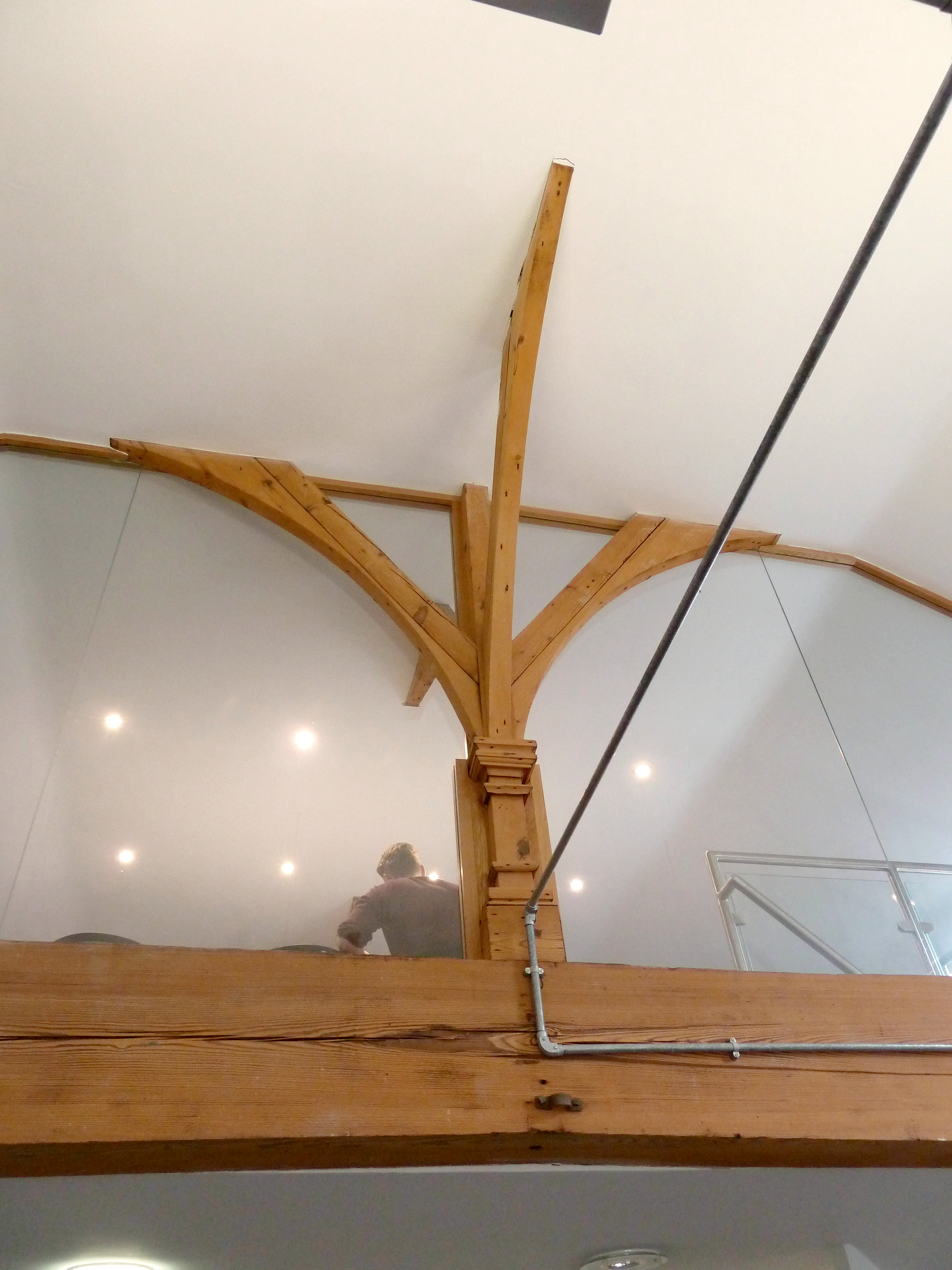
Original pitch pine roof truss in nave

The original plan shown to journalists at the foundation ceremony showed a nave 63 feet (19 m) by 26 feet (7.9 m), and a chancel 23.5 feet (7.2 m) by 26 feet (7.9 m). The widths of the south porch, and the north and south aisles were 12 feet (3.7 m) and 11.5 feet (3.5 m) wide respectively. At the east end of the north aisle, alongside the chancel, was a space for the organ (this was in place by 1907, as pictured above). Beneath the chancel and the east ends of both aisles were "spacious vestries and a heating chamber." By the time of the September 1887 consecration, these undercroft rooms had become two vestries, a heating chamber and a store room. There was room for these as the ground inclined rapidly to the west, and the chancel above was raised by seven steps. The Huddersfield Chronicle described the 1886 plans for the interior thus:

"Internally the roofs and chancel arch are somewhat striking, owing to the wide span and heavy timbers which will be used, but all details such as the windows and open benches are very plainly drawn. The east window will be of three long lancet lights, ad here is an opportunity for a display of stained glass, which would be a decoration of great value to the interior of the building. [In the event, no stained glass was ever forthcoming in this poor area]. Seats are to be provided for 422 adults and 112 children"

At the consecration, the accommodation was described as "500 adults." The cost was estimated in 1886 at £3,250 (equivalent to £370,000 in 2025). Messrs B. Graham and Nephew of Mold Green, Kirkheaton contracted for the excavators, masons, carpenters and joiners' work. George Garton contracted for the plumbers and glaziers; Mr Jowitt contracted for the slaters and plasterers; and S. Kendall contracted for the painters. Mr Calvert made the heating apparatus.

The internal wooden roofs of nave and chancel were described in 1887 as "waggon-headed"; that is to say that the ceiling above the trusses was in the form of a round arch like the cover of a wagon. This type of roof was believed to give "good acoustic properties." In 1887 there was a font, paid for by W.H. Jessop, a carved wooden pulpit given by Mrs Foster in memory of Mr Laycock, and a brass lectern funded by Mrs Laing.

== Architect ==
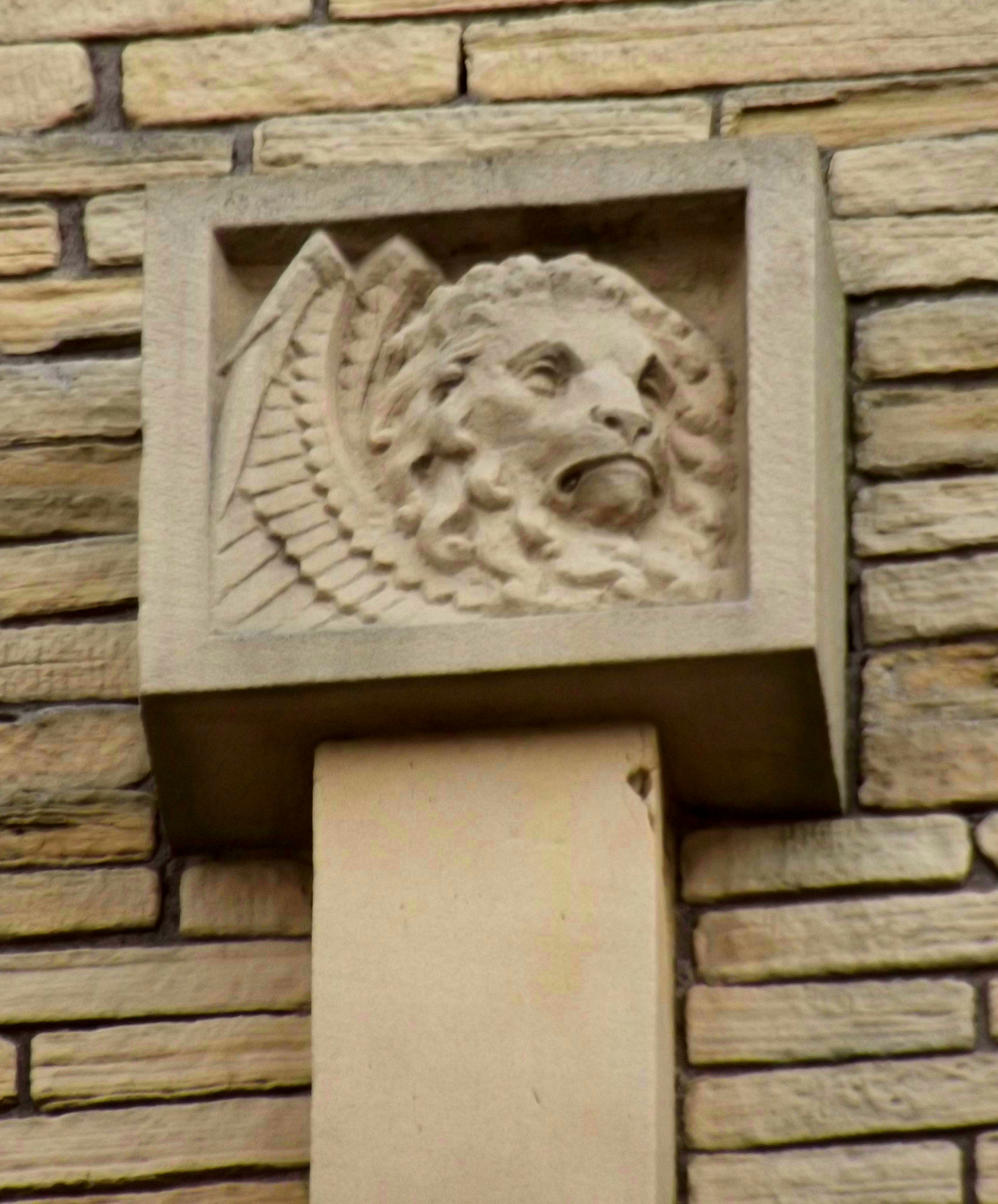
Symbol of Mark the Evangelist on west wall

The architect William Swinden Barber, living locally at Farfield House, Halifax, was able to superintend the whole work. Due to a scarcity of funds and a large congregation, his initial brief was for a "Mission Church on a large scale," with "exceedingly plain" detail on a structure with great stability, containing equally substantial pews.

== History ==
The church was closed for services and deconsecrated by the Church of England on 1 November 1997. It was hired by the Church of England under covenant to the Huddersfield Sea Cadet Corps whose tenancy is remembered for the large cutout of a ship which the corps placed across the east window. It was then hired to an office equipment company, selling second-hand office furniture. On 18 September 2001 all covenants were removed and it was sold to Church property holdings Limited which conserved the interior stone carvings and the major roof timbers, and divided the building into offices. These offices are now rented out to other companies.

== Sculpture of St Mark's ==
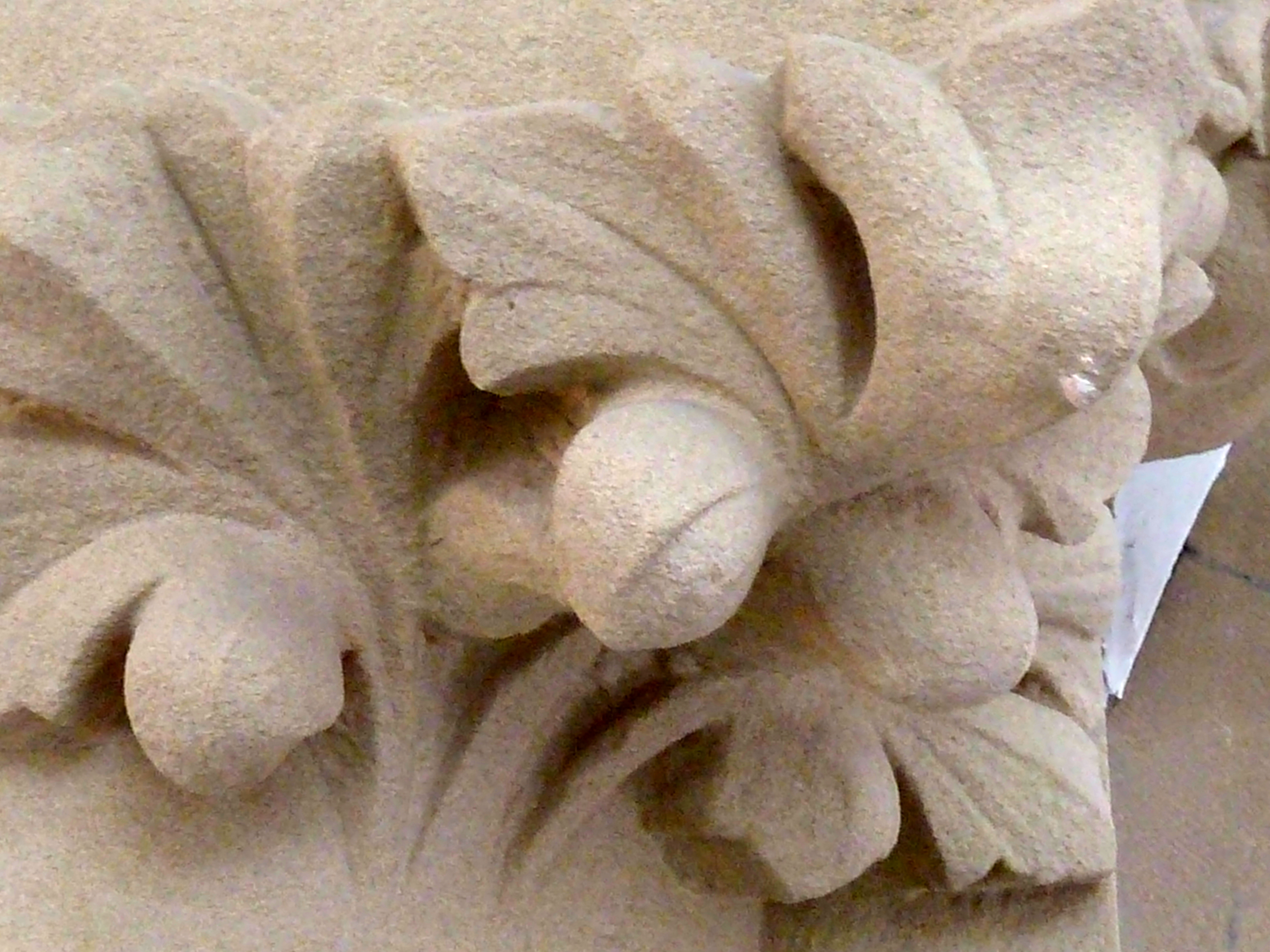
Figs with fruit on south side of chancel arch

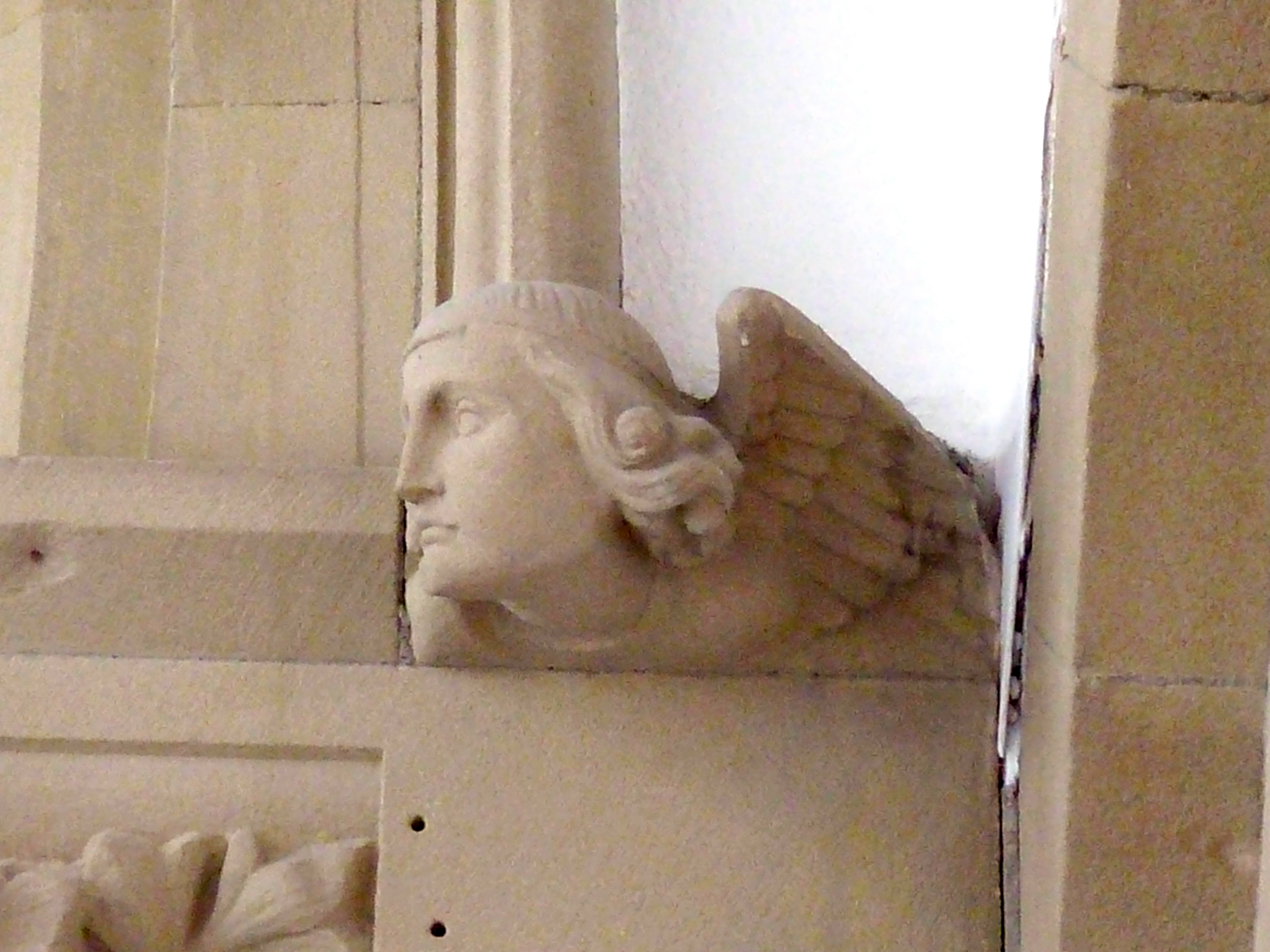
Feminine angel on south side of chancel arch

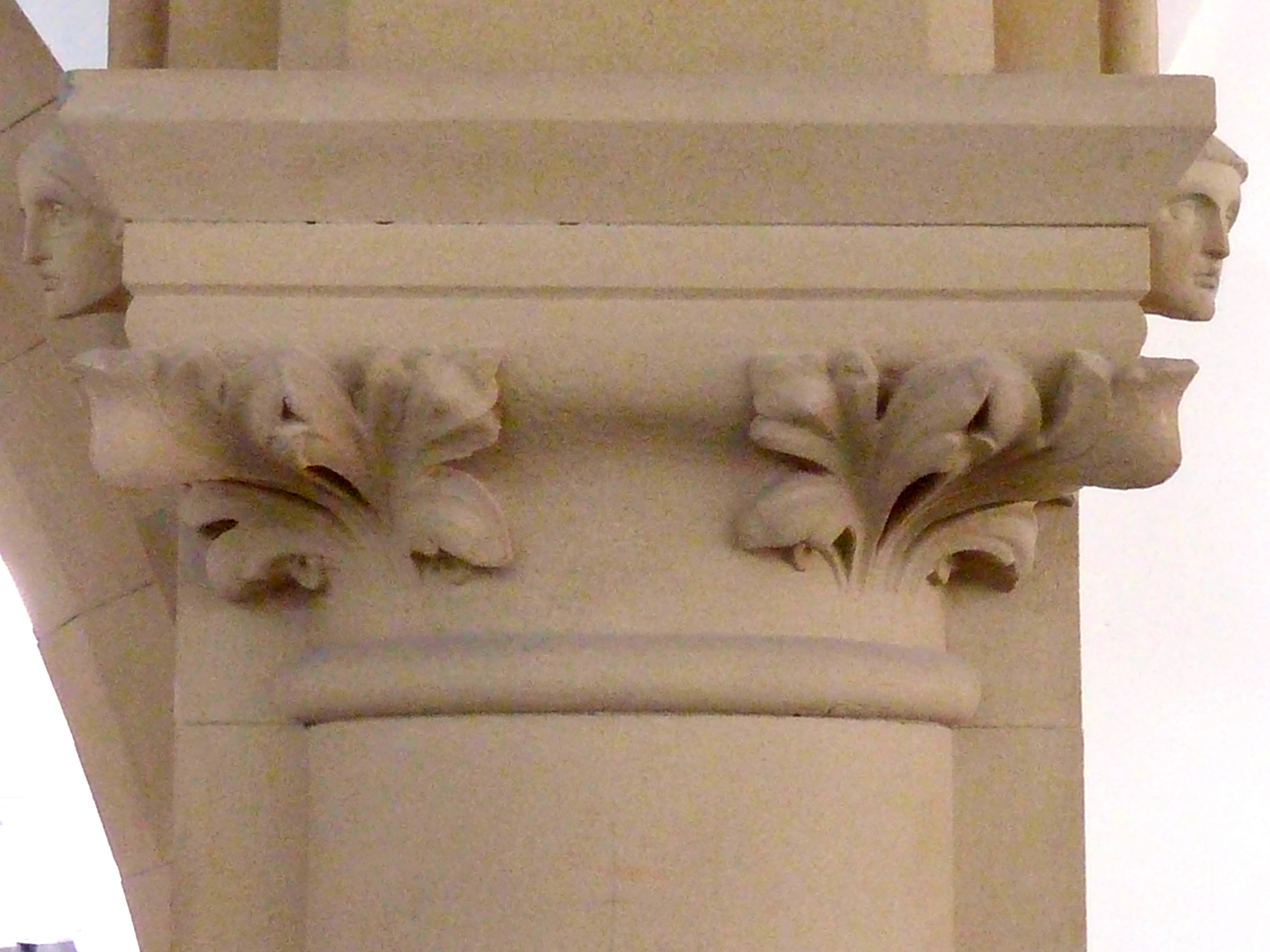
Figs without fruit on north side of chancel arch

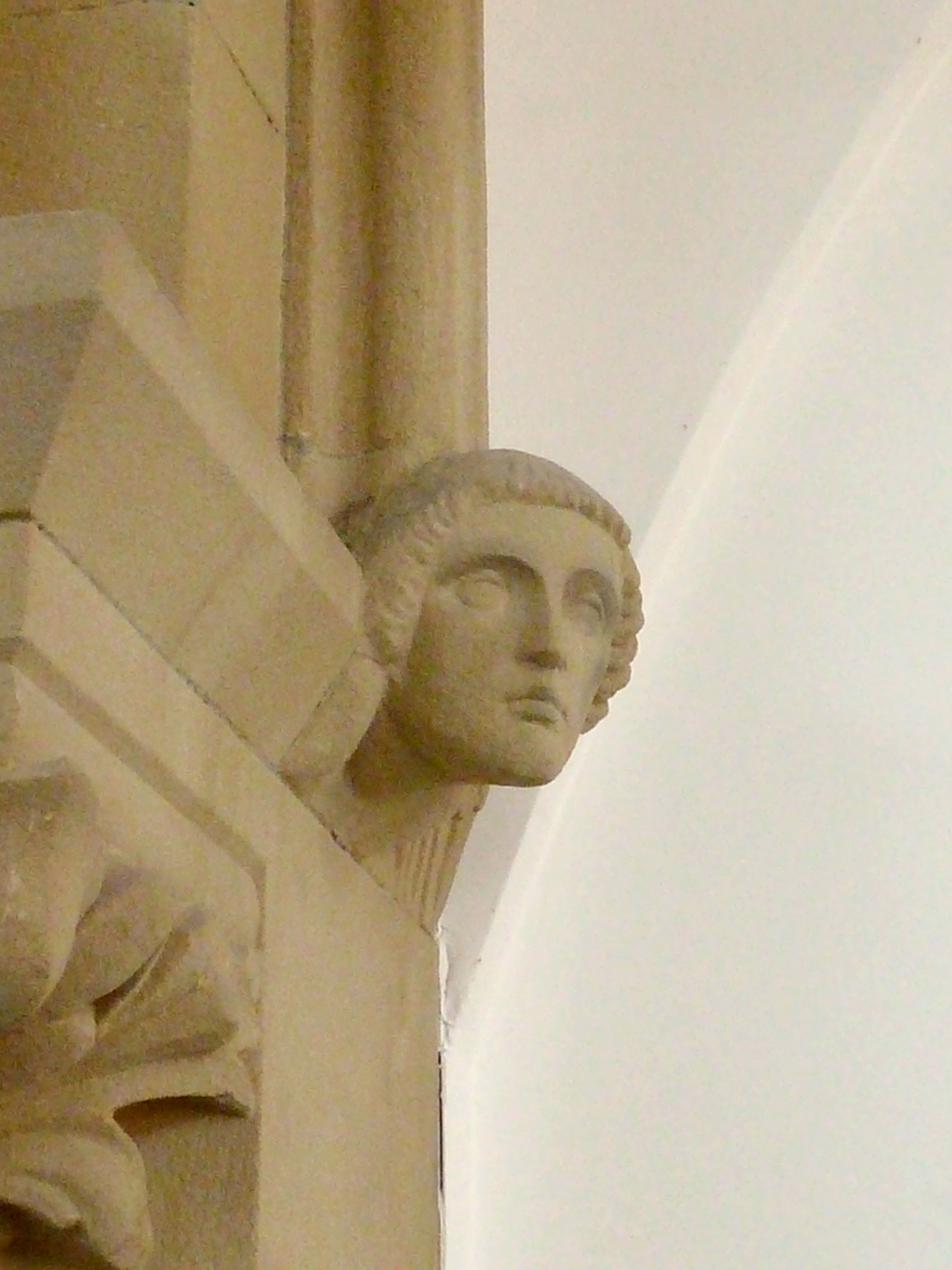
Masculine angel on north side of chancel arch

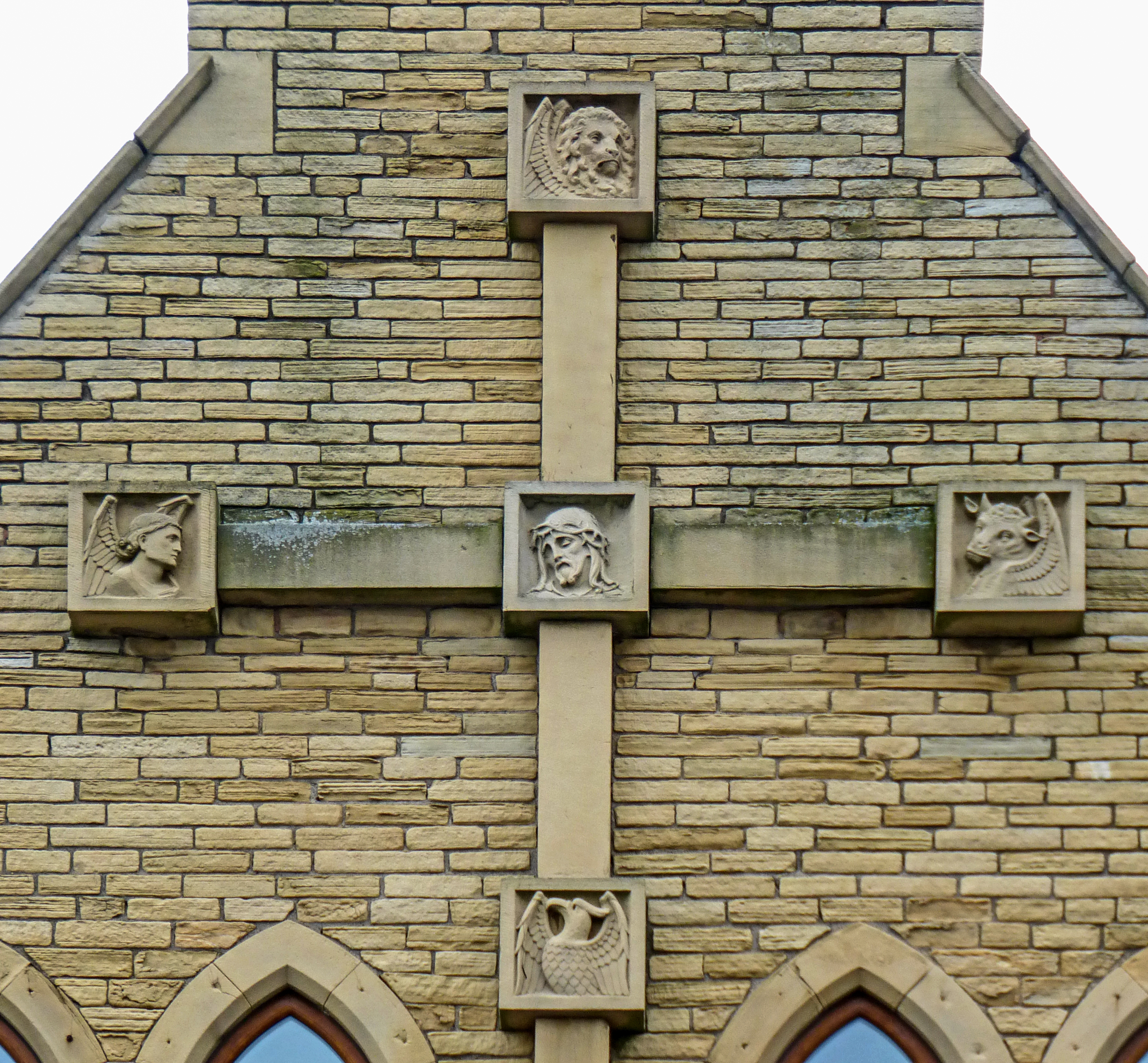
Cross on west wall showing symbols of Evangelists

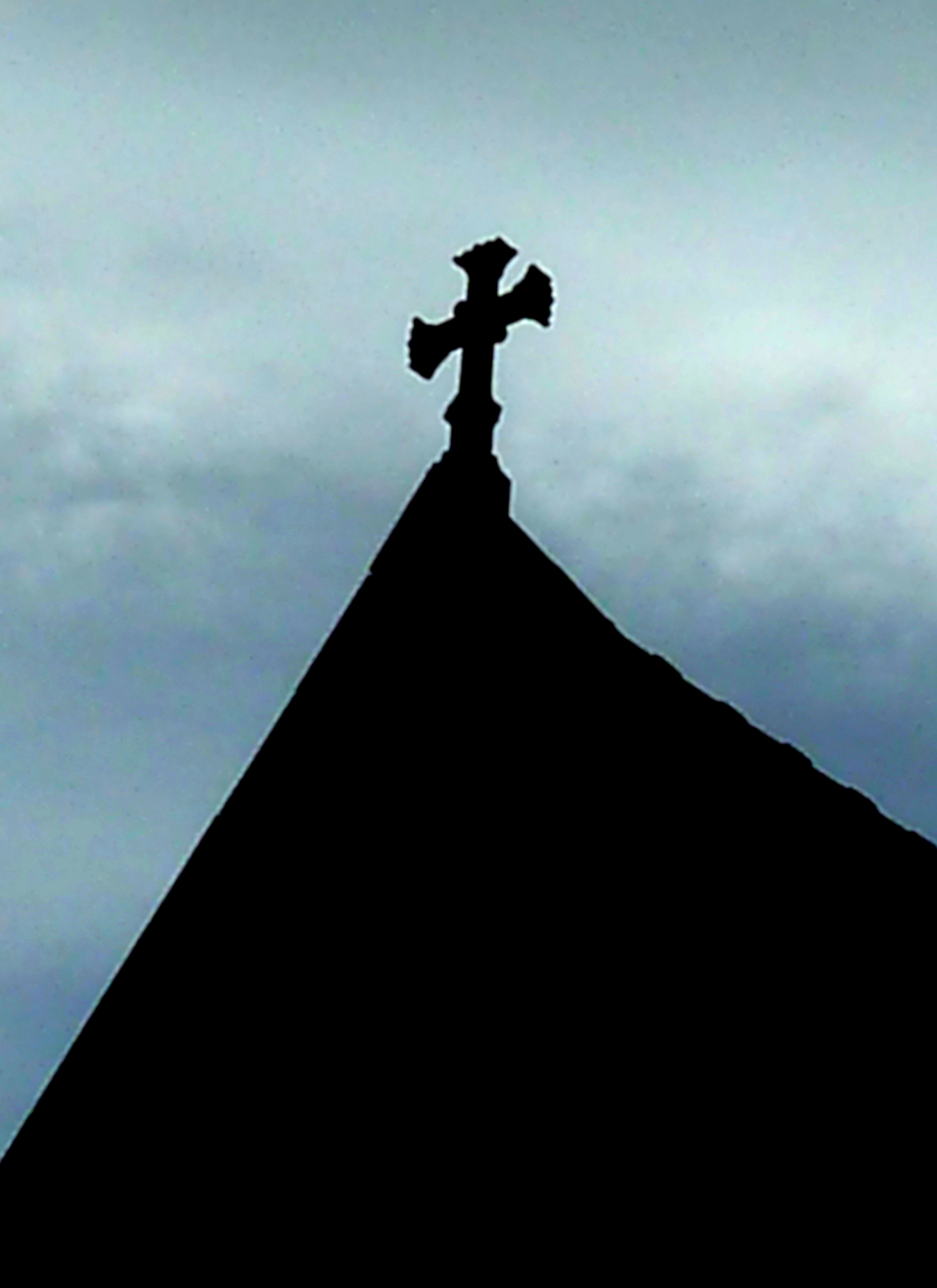
Carved stone cross above chancel

== Clergy ==
=== Reverend John Dunbar 1887–1888 ===
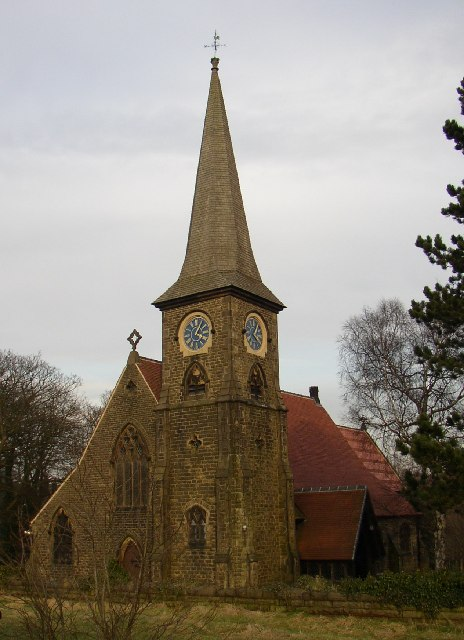
Christ Church, Helme: Dunbar's last placement

Reverend John Dunbar (1856–1925): His father was John Dunbar (born 1820 in Ireland), a bootmaker employing one person in 1861. His mother was Susan Smith (born 1819 in Bolton), working in the manufacture of buckets and hose in the same year, when they were living at 26 Blair Street, Toxteth Park, Liverpool. They married in 1842 in West Derby. John, the youngest of five siblings, was born in Liverpool in 1856. The 1871 Census finds the family at the same address, with only two of John's siblings present: a pupil teacher and an apprentice watchmaker. He graduated from St Aidan's College, Durham 1878. He was ordained deacon 1880, and priest 1881 by the Bishop of Chester. He was curate of St Peter's Church, Rock Ferry, Birkenhead 1880–1884. The 1881 Census finds him still single at age 23 years, as a boarder at 132 Conway Street, Birkenhead. He married Annie Dean (1853–1891) in the Wirral in 1883.

He was curate of St Peter's Church, Huddersfield 1884–1887. In 1887 the vicar of St Peter's, Rev. J.W. Bardsley, said that Dunbar's work at the Mission Church, Huddersfield, had been "most prosperous." He said that Dunbar preached "thorough, simple, faithful, gospel sermons, was a first rate parish priest, understood something of the feeling of the brotherhood of man, gave a good grip of the hand, and had a habit of getting round people in a very remarkable way."

Dunbar was vicar of St Mark, Leeds Road from Wednesday 21 December 1887 to November 1888, being licensed to the post by the Bishop of Ripon. From Wednesday 7 November to Saturday 10 November 1888, a bazaar was held in the Town Hall. It raised gross receipts of £1,400 towards the endowment of the church. It was well-attended, with a final auction of remaining goods on the last day. The bazaar was one of the last contributions of John Dunbar while vicar of St Mark's.

He transferred to St Stephen, Rashcliffe, and served there from November 1888 until at least 1911. Annie died, possibly in childbirth, around February 1891, so the 5–6 April 1891 Census finds John as a widower and vicar of Rashcliffe, with three children: Dean (b.1885), Leslie (b.1888), and Ursula (b.1891) aged two months. In 1901 he was 44, still living at St Stephen's vicarage in Victoria Road, Rashcliffe, Huddersfield, with the children now aged ten to 16, and two sisters-in-law with surname Dean. In 1911 at age 53 he was still vicar of Rashcliffe and still at the 12-room vicarage. He was living with his medical student son Leslie aged 23, his two sisters-in-law, a niece and two servants. His daughter Ursula had died in 1908, aged 17.

He later became vicar of Helme, Meltham. He died at Helme vicarage on 30 January 1925 at Huddersfield, aged 68 years. There was a memorial service at Helme Church on 2 February 1925 followed by his funeral at Huddersfield Cemetery.

=== Canon Percy Holbrook 1888–1891 ===
Canon Percy Holbrook MA (1859–1946): He was born in Reading, Berkshire, England, the son of a silk mercer or draper. He was vicar of the St Mark's 1888–1891, and Holy Trinity Church, Trinity Square, Nottingham 1892–1933, and was Hon. Canon of Woodborough in Southwark Cathedral from 1911. During his working life he chaired and supported numerous church and charitable organizations. The Nottingham Post said of him that he "had original ideas and courage to express them," and that "he endeared himself to successive generations of parishioners and citizens ... He was an eloquent preacher, a wise and gentle counsellor, and an understanding friend."

=== Rev Thomas Killam-Killam 1891–1897 ===
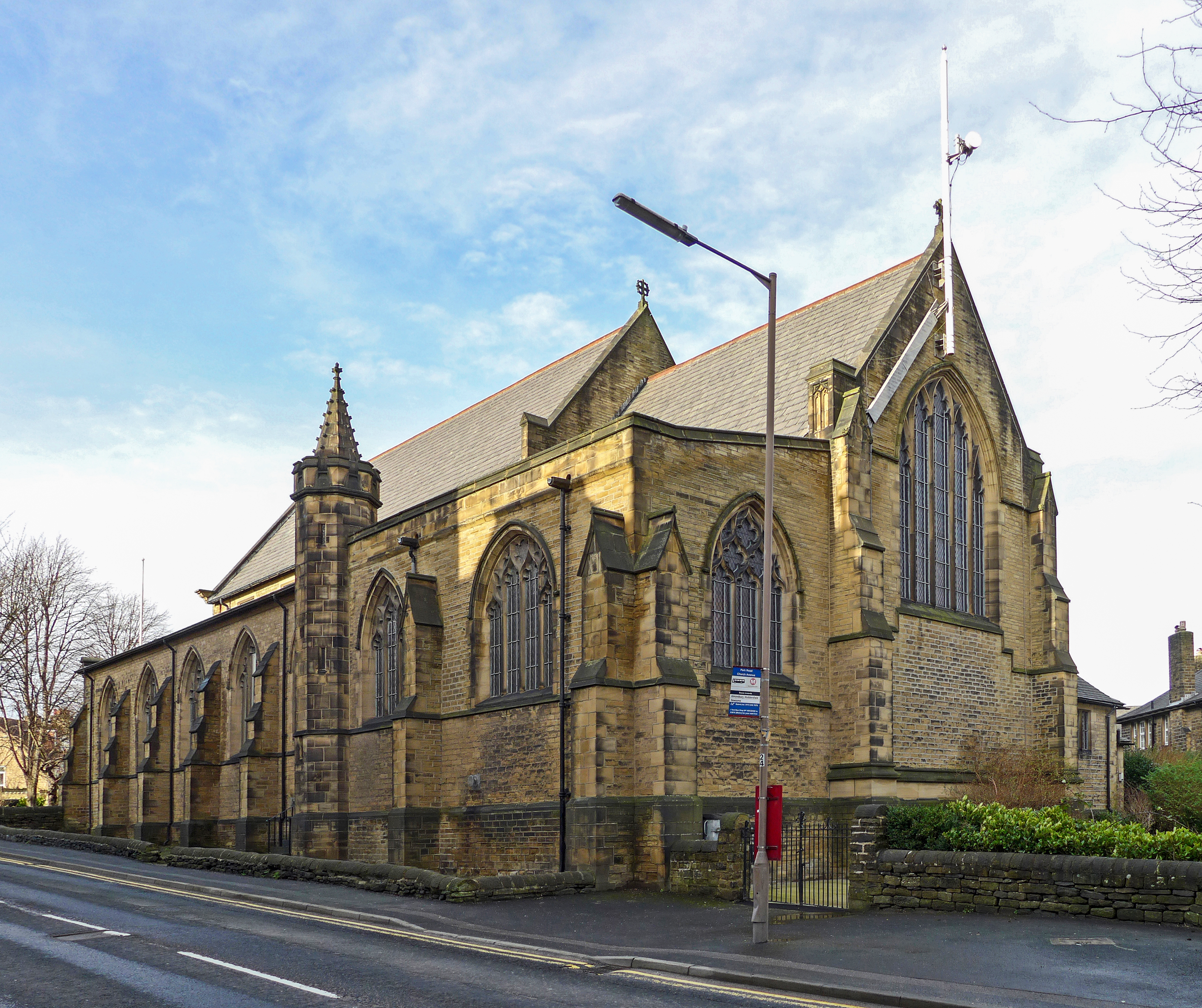
St Barnabas, where Killam served 37 years

Reverend Thomas Killam-Killam MA (1860–1938): His father was William Parkin Killam (b.1831), a corn miller from Lincolnshire. His mother was Hannah Martin (b.1836). He was born the eldest of six children in Cowick near Hull. He attended Chancellor's School, Lincoln, and Pembroke College, Oxford. He was ordained deacon in 1883, and priest in 1885.

He was offered the curacy of Meltham in 1883. He was curate of St Stephen's Rashcliffe, Huddersfield until 1892. In 1891 the Census listed him as a clerk in holy orders, boarding at 12 Victoria Road, Lockwood, Huddersfield. He was vicar of St Mark's 1892–1897, living at 6 George Street.

In 1897 the Bishop of Wakefield offered him the benefice of the new parish of St Barnabas, Crosland Moor, Huddersfield. The church was not completed and consecrated until 1902. He was vicar of Crosland Moor 1897 to 1934 when he retired having completed 50 years as a priest in the Wakefield diocese. In 1901 he was still at Lockwood, Huddersfield, boarding at 32 College Street. The 1911 Census finds him single at age 52, living with his housekeeper at the six-room Crosland Moor vicarage, Huddersfield.

At the age of 70, he married Mary Morse Davies (1879–1945) in Huddersfield in 1928, when Mary was about 49 years old. Her father was the Rev. J. Davies, vicar of Newsome. He died at his home in Grasmere Road, Huddersfield aged 80 on Wednesday 31 August 1938. He was buried at Lockwood on Saturday 3 September after a service at St Barnabas. The vicar Rev. C.F. Welsh and Canon H.F.T. Barter, Rural Dean, officiated at the service. At the graveside were Killam's brother-in-law Rev. J.C. Davies of Copthorne, Worcestershire, and Archdeacon Albert Baines. The choir acted as bearers. A number of relatives attended as mourners, including his widow, brother and sister. His wife Mary died aged 64 in 1945 in Huddersfield.

=== George Sydney Dunbar, curate 1894–1896 ===
Reverend George Sydney Dunbar (1871–1947): His father was George Samuel Dunbar (1846–1897), born in Liverpool. Between 1869 and 1883, George Samuel was curate of Slaidburn, Pontefract and Marske-by-the-Sea, then vicar of Eastrington. George Sydney's mother was Elizabeth Mellor Storey (born Liverpool 1847). George Samuel and Elizabeth married in the Wirral in 1870. George Sydney was born the eldest of five children in 1871 in Slaidburn, Lancashire. Like his father he studied at St Bees Theological College, Cumberland and graduated in 1893. He achieved a 1st class prelim T.E. in 1894. He was ordained deacon in 1894, and was ordained priest at Wakefield Cathedral by the Bishop of Wakefield on 1 March 1896. He married Edith Jane Johnson (1870–1962) in Howden in 1895.

He was curate of St Mark's Huddersfield 1894–1896. He was curate of St Stephen Birmingham 1896–1900, and St Anne's Church, Derby 1900–1905. The 1901 Census finds him living with his wife and family at 92 Kedlestone Road, Derby. He was curate of St Alban's Church, Sneinton Nottingham 1905–1919; St Anselm Streatham (demolished) 1919–1922; St Peter Acton Green, London from 1927 to at least 1932. He died aged 75 in 1947 in Kensington.

=== Reverend Robert Alfred Humble 1897–1901 ===
Reverend Robert Alfred Humble BA (1864–1929) was an Anglican priest, born in Heathery Cleugh, Weardale, Durham, England. His father was Reverend Emerson Humble (1837–1901). His career was marked with much pastoral work, including organising local fundraising events and meals for the elderly. He contributed to the work of committees, and joined in local social events, being a member of his church's cricket team. It is in this context of sociability and regular work among his congregation that the events surrounding the delayed discovery of his death, mentioned in several newspapers, remain a puzzle. Having suffered a seizure, he apparently lay openly on a flower bed in his vicarage garden on a dark February night, while his congregation spent 11 hours searching for him on the adjacent moorland. He was vicar of St Mark's 1897–1901.

=== Reverend James Sowter 1901–1905 ===
Reverend James Sowter (1855–1917): His father was Abraham Sowter (b.1826) of Chapel Street, Crooks Place, Norwich, a clerk in a fire insurance office. His mother was Sarah Day (b.1821) from St Osyth, Essex. Abraham and Sarah married in Norwich in 1847.

He was born in Norwich in 1855. He graduated from St Bees 1882, ordained deacon in 1884 and priest 1885 by the Bishop of Liverpool. He was made curate of St Silas, Pembroke Place, Liverpool, 1884–1886; St Andrew Liverpool 1886–1888; St Paul Old Ford Middlesex 1888–1890. In Honiton in 1888 he married Minnie Hook (1861–1900). The 1891 Census finds James and Minnie living alone with a servant at 18 Parker's Road, Sheffield.

He was vicar of Christ Church, Silloth, Cumbria 1890–1901. He was the Associate Secretary for CCCS for the north-east district 1890–1899. He took up the benefice of St Mark's in December 1901 by exchange with Reverend Humble and remained there until 1905. In Huddersfield in 1904 he married Martha Elizabeth Storry (1855–1942). In 1905 he became rector of Steeple Gidding, and was there at least until 1908. He then became vicar of Holme, Peterborough, where he stayed until his death. The 1911 Census finds James and Martha living at the 11-room Holme Vicarage with his son Reginald Keith Sowter (b.1897) the son of his first wife Minnie, and a servant. James died aged 62 of heart failure following an operation, on 24 August 1917 at Brighton. His wife Martha died in 1942 in Bournemouth, aged 87.

=== Reverend Jonas Pilling 1905–1921 ===
Reverend Jonas Pilling (1855–1926) was vicar of St Mark's from 1905 to 1921. He was the notorious subject of many newspaper articles about the 14-year dispute between Pilling and his congregation, the absence of churchwardens, other officials and choir, the dwindling of his congregation and the dereliction of the church building. This occurred in an industrial environment of great poverty, where there was "plenty of scope for church work."

=== Reverend Joseph Miller 1929–1931 ===
Reverend Joseph Miller BD (b.1874) was a Congregational minister, much in demand as an "eloquent preacher" for 14 years in the north of England. While in Hamburg during his ministry he "rendered valuable assistance to his countrymen in distress" following a call from the American Embassy there. However, in 1929 he "created a sensation" by becoming an Anglican priest. His first Anglican incumbency was as vicar of St Mark's Church, from 1929 to 1931.
