= Robert Alfred Humble =

- Reverend
- Church: 1888 St Bartholomew Sheffield; 1890 St Stephen Lindley; 1897 St Mark Leeds Rd Hudd; 1902 Christ Church, Silloth; 1928 St Mary's, Cumwhitton

Orders
- Ordination: 1889 (priest) by Bishop of York

Personal details
- Born: 1864 Heathery Cleugh, Weardale, Durham, England
- Died: 31 January 1929 (aged 64–65) Cumwhitton, England
- Education: University College, Durham
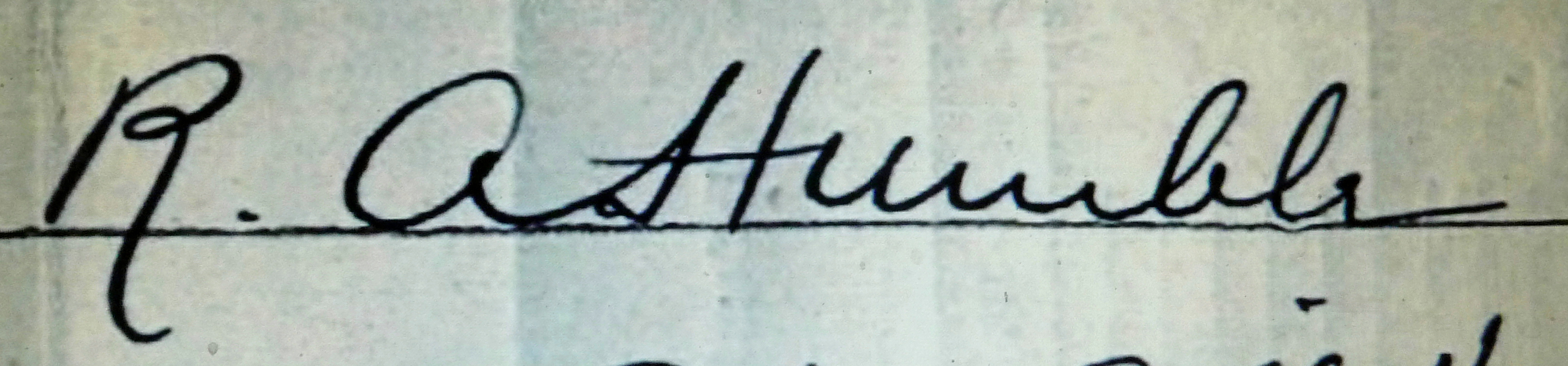
- Signature

Robert Alfred Humble (1864 – 31 January 1929) was an Anglican priest, born in Heathery Cleugh, Weardale, Durham, England. His father was Reverend Emerson Humble (1837–1901). His career was marked with much pastoral work, including organising local fundraising events and meals for the elderly. He contributed to the work of committees, and joined in local social events, being a member of his church's cricket team. He was a "very popular figure." It is in this context of sociability and regular work among his congregation that the events surrounding the delayed discovery of his death, mentioned in several newspapers, remain a puzzle. Having suffered a seizure, he apparently lay openly on a flower bed in his vicarage garden on a dark February night, while his congregation spent eleven hours searching for him on the adjacent moorland. One of Rev. Humble's incumbencies was St Mark's, Old Leeds Road, Huddersfield, 1897–1901.

== Background ==
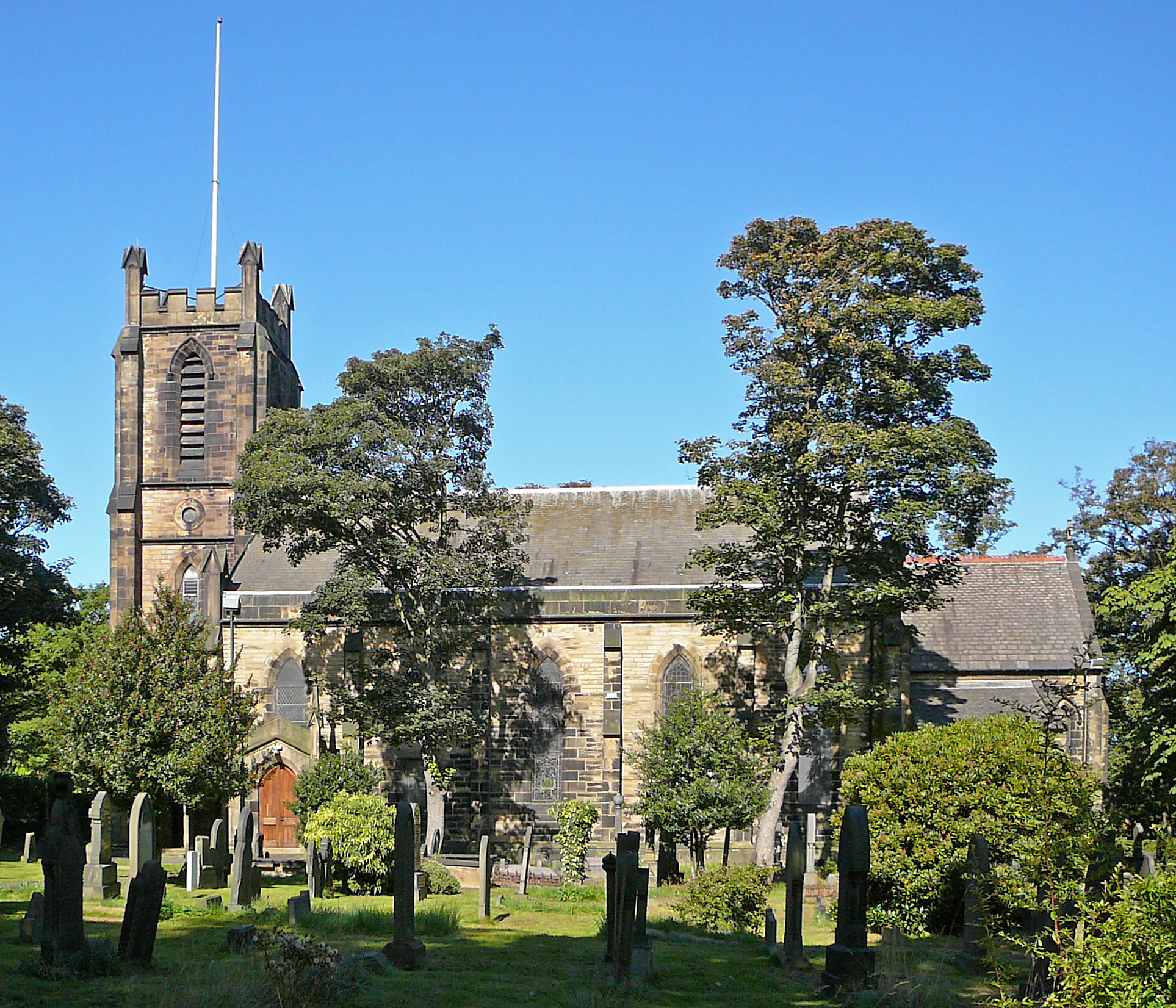
St Stephen, Lindley, where Humble served 1890–1897

His father was Rev Emerson Humble (1837–1901), born at Stanhope. Robert Alfred's mother was Elizabeth Peart (born 1831). Emerson and Elizabeth married in Weardale in 1863. Between 1872 and 1897, Emerson was curate of Earsdon, Ryton, and Sacred Trinity Salford, and was rector of St Stephen Hulme and of Gisleham. Robert Alfred was born in Heathery Cleugh, Weardale, Durham. He married Louisa Mary Shepherd (1862–1952) in 1895. They had two children, including a daughter Elizabeth Greta, born 1900 in Huddersfield.

== Career ==
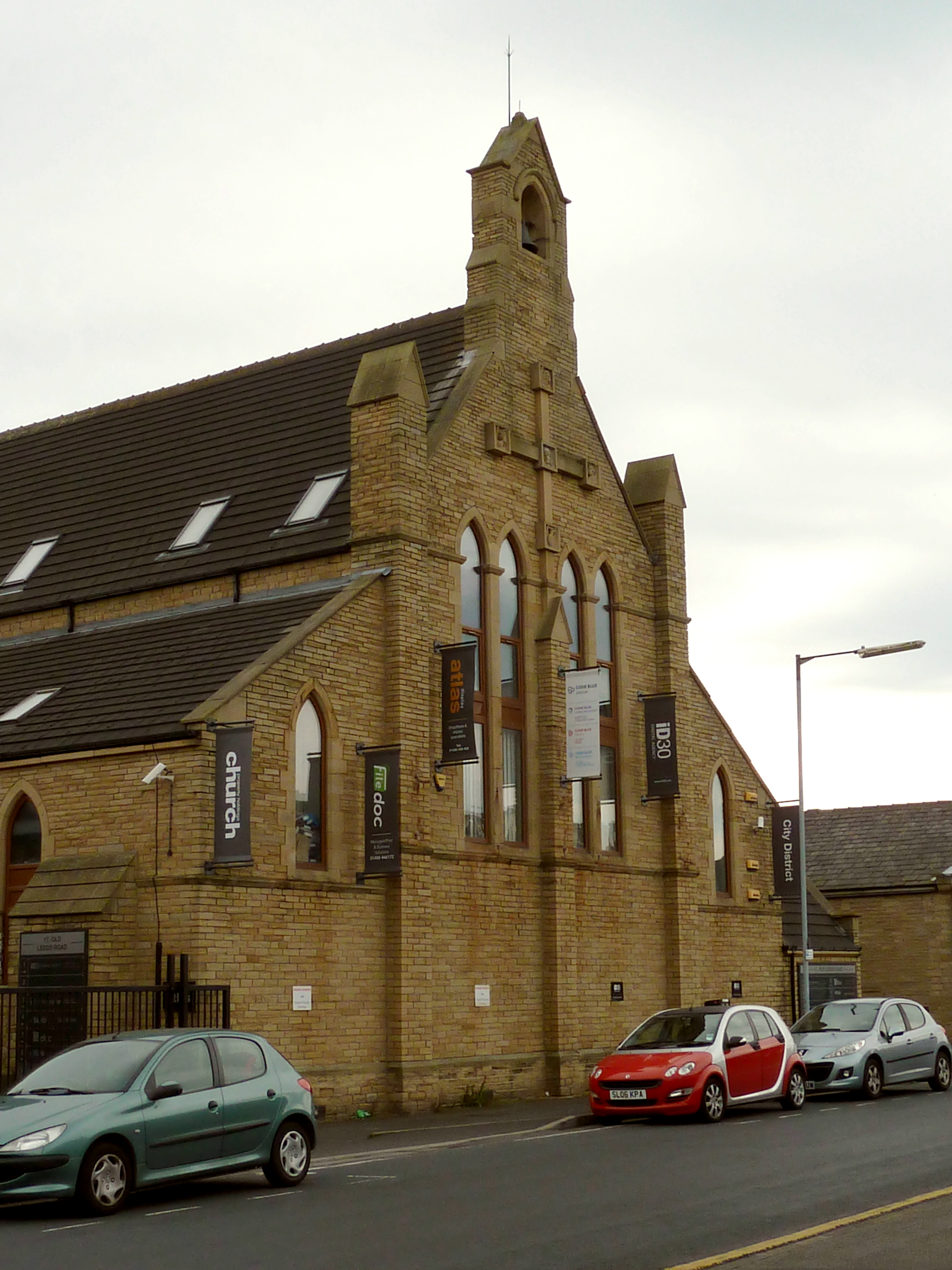
St Mark, Huddersfield where he served 1897–1901

He gained his BA from University College, Durham 1887. He was ordained deacon 1888, and priest 1889 by the Bishop of York.

=== Sheffield ===
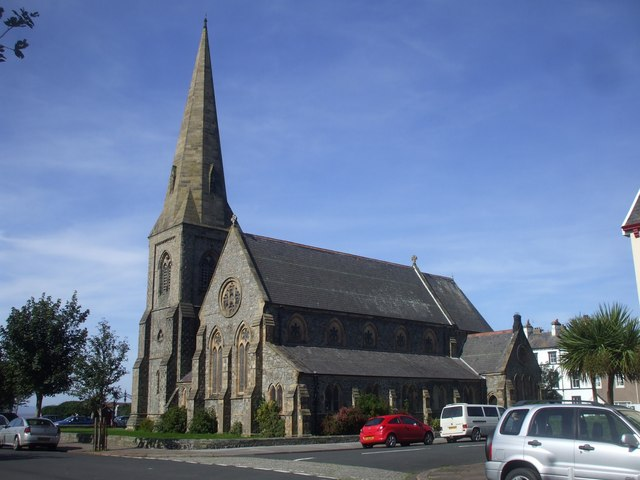
Christ Church, Silloth, where he served 1902–1928

He was curate of St Bartholomew, Sheffield 1888–1890. While at St Bartholomew's he helped to arrange a three-day bazaar to raise funds for a Sunday school and a parochial room, and he manned the hardware stall. The bazaar was opened on Tuesday 22 April 1890 in the presence of J.B. Jackson, Mayor of Sheffield, and Archdeacon Blakeney.

=== Lindley ===
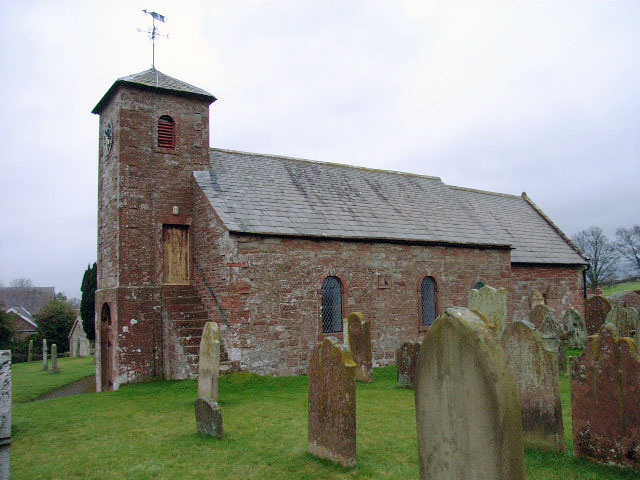
St Mary, Cumwhitton, where he served 1928–1929

He was curate of St Stephen, Lindley, West Yorkshire 1890–1897. On Saturday 3 January 1891 he helped to organise a gathering for over 400 elderly people, in which they were offered a tea with speeches and entertainment, and were given money and fruit, including oranges, which had been contributed by local gentry and tradespeople. In 1891 he played cricket for his church team at Lindley. On Saturday 25 July 1891 at the Outlane Mission Church bazaar he batted for the gents' Cambodunum Druids against the ladies' Woodland Fairies in a lighthearted cricket match in which the ladies had bats and the gentlemen wielded broomsticks. On Wednesday 30 May 1894 he attended the funeral of David Midgley JP, riding in the first carriage of the very long funeral procession. He conducted the graveside service "impressively."

On Sunday 27 January 1895 he attended a public meeting of the Church of England Temperance Society in the Parochial Hall, Huddersfield, where he acted as clerical secretary. In general, the speakers took a liberal view on the subject of restricting and licensing public houses. On Saturday 12 October 1895 he attended a conference of the Huddersfield and District Bible Classes and Mutual Improvement Societies Association, providing support for the chairman. One the resolutions of that conference called upon the watch committee and the police to do everything possible to prevent the use of public houses for gambling, which speakers described as "rampant evil."

=== Huddersfield ===
He was vicar of St Mark, Leeds Road 1897–1901. In 1899 his curate at St Mark's was Rev J. Morgan. In 1899, at a meeting of the Huddersfield and District Shorthand Writers' Association, he read a paper entitled Amusements which gave "great satisfaction, nearly all the members present having something to say upon the subject." In 1900, at a meeting of St Mark's Mutual Improvement Society in The Parish Room, Huddersfield, Humble read a paper entitled Hymns and Their Writers. "He gave some very interesting accounts of how certain hymns came to be written. He also impressed upon his audience the desirability of having their minds imbued with the spirit of a hymn when singing." He received a "hearty vote of thanks."

=== Silloth ===
In December 1901, he exchanged places with Rev. James Sowter, vicar of Silloth, and he was vicar of Christ Church, Silloth, from 16 January 1902 to 1928. During his 27 years at Silloth, he was a "very popular figure", serving on the local district council, and taking part in many activities there. The 1911 Census finds him living at the ten-room house, "The Pines" at Silloth, with his wife, his daughter Elizabeth Greta, and a servant.

=== Cumwhitton ===
He was vicar of St Mary's, Cumwhitton, Cumberland from 1928 until his death in 1929.

== Death ==
According to reports of the inquest of 1 February 1929, Humble died from "heart disease" or "heart collapse" at midnight on 30 January, or in the early hours of 31 January 1929, aged 64. He had left the vicarage in the afternoon to post letters at the village post office but did not return for afternoon tea. "In a wild district of Cumberland", villagers "searched the countryside" for him for eleven hours and eventually found him at, or just after, midnight lying dead on a flower bed in the vicarage garden. The inquest found that he had "lain there for eleven hours."

His wife Louisa died aged 89 in 1952 in Salisbury.
