= Joseph Miller (priest) =

British Congregational minister (born 1874)

- Reverend
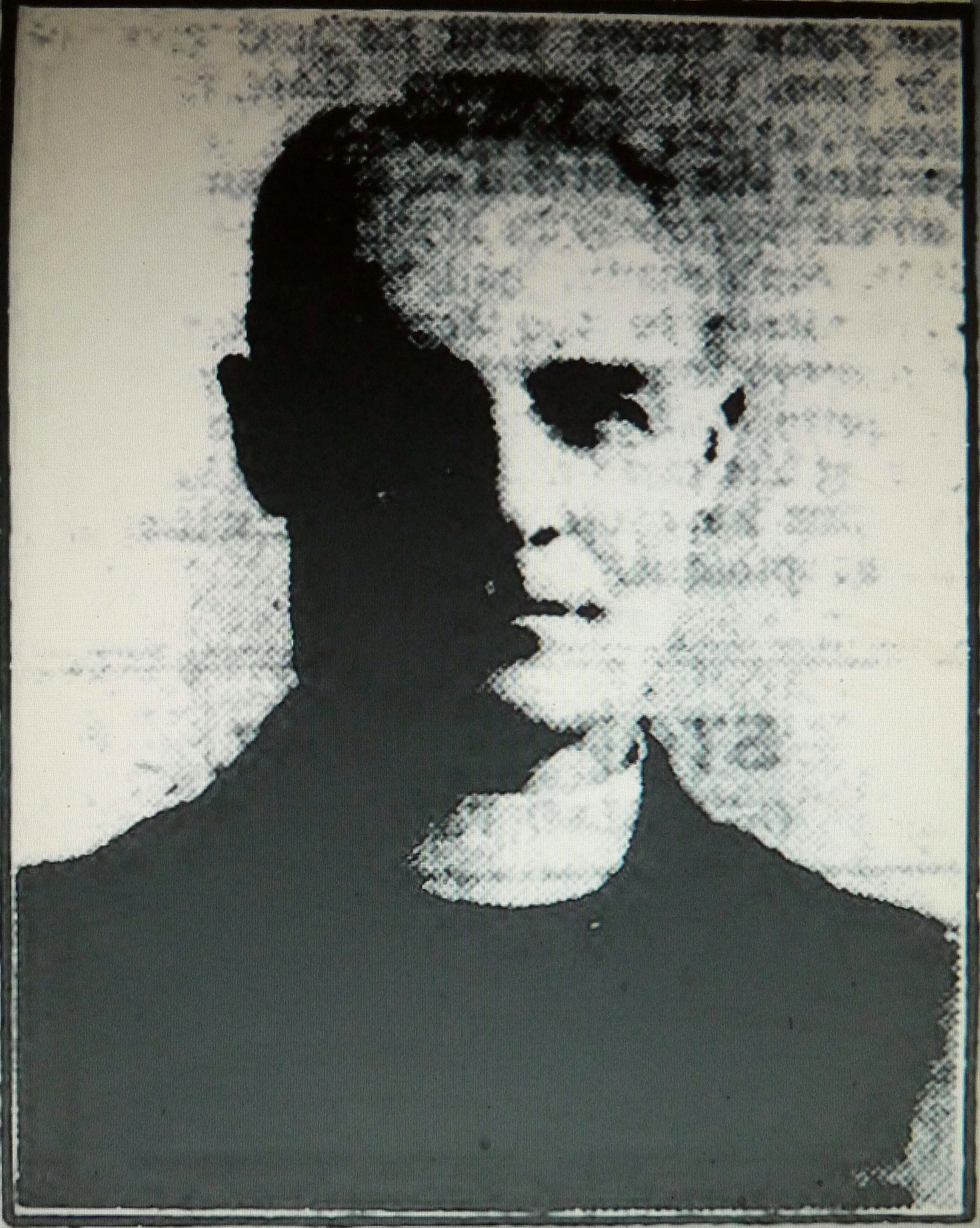
- Reverend Joseph Miller in 1934
- Church: Congregational churches 1904 Regent Street, Oldham; 1908 Runcorn; 1911 Spittal; 1912 Hamburg; 1915 Morpeth; 1922 Cleckheaton Westgate; Anglican churches 1929 St Mark Huddersfield; 1931 St James Stainborough; 1934 St Lucius, Farnley Tyas

Orders
- Ordination: 1900 (minister); 1929 (Anglican priest) by Bishop of Wakefield

Personal details
- Born: 1874 Allhallows, Cumbria England
- Died: 1961 (aged 86–87) Westmorland
- Education: Nottingham Paton College; Cuddesdon College, Oxford
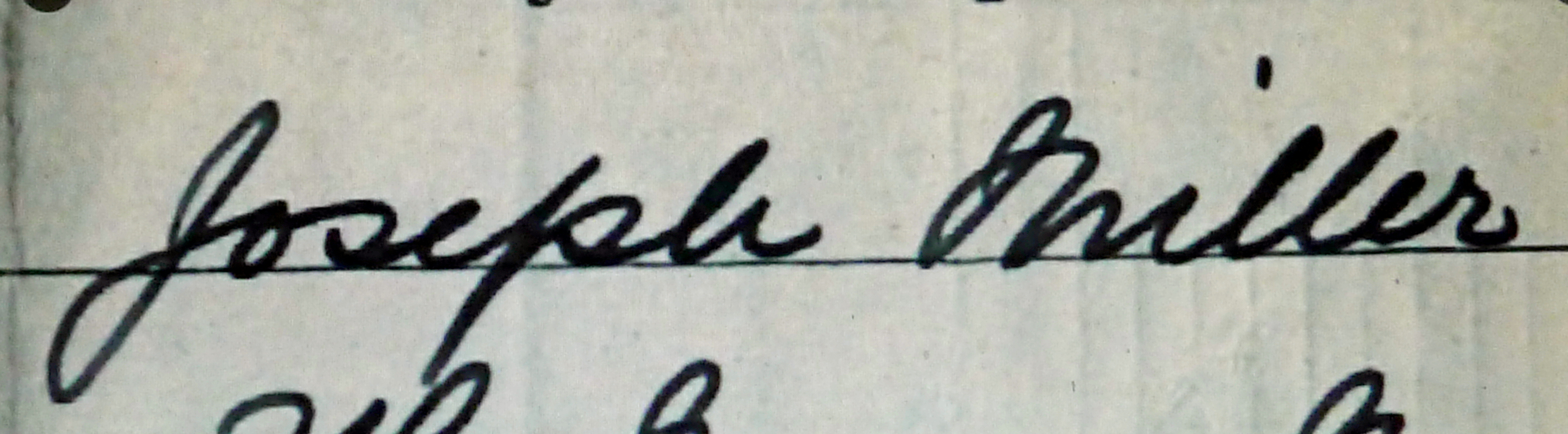
- Signature: Joseph Miller's signature

Reverend Joseph Miller BD (1874 – 1961) was a British Congregational minister, much in demand as an "eloquent preacher" for 14 years in the north of England. While in Hamburg during his ministry he "rendered valuable assistance to his countrymen in distress" following a call from the American Embassy there. However, in 1929 he "created a sensation" by becoming an Anglican priest. His first Anglican incumbency was as vicar of the Church of St Mark, Old Leeds Road, Huddersfield, England, from 1929 to 1931.

== Life ==
Miller's father was Saul Miller (1841–1902), (Note: Saul Miller (died 1902). GRO index: Deaths Mar 1902 Miller Saul 60 Wigton vol. 10b p. 396.) who was born in Leesrigg, Cumbria and died in Wigton. He was a farmer of 273 acres, employing five men and one woman. His mother was Betty "Jane" Timperon (1846–1895), (Note: Betty Miller née Timperon (1845–1895). GRO index: Births Sep 1845 Timperon Betty Wigton vol. XXV p. 171. Marriages Jun 1870, Timperon Jane and Miller Saul, Wigton vol. 10b p. 791. Deaths Mar 1895 Miller Jane 48 Wigton vol. 10b p. 397) born in Keswick. They were married at Wigton in 1870. Joseph was born in Leesrigg or Allhallows, Cumbria, the second of five children, in 1874. (Note: Joseph Wigton Miller (born 1874) GRO index: Births Jun 1874 Miller Joseph Wigton vol. 10b p. 544.) He was descended from a long line of Anglicans. Miller said that "one of his uncles offered to send him to Oxford or Cambridge in order to prepare for the Anglican ministry." However he graduated from Nottingham Paton College, a dissenting academy, in 1900. In 1901 he was a boarder at Kirton House, Spalding Road, Kirton, Lincolnshire, and a student Congregationalist pastor at age 26. He married Lily Hemsley in Nottingham in 1908. (Note: Lily Hemsley (born Newcastle 1875). GRO index: Marriages Mar 1908 MILLER Joseph, Lily Hemsley, Nottingham vol. 7b p. 575.) He died in Westmorland in 1961. (Note: Reverend Joseph Miller (1874 – 1961). GRO index: Deaths Dec 1961 Miller Joseph 87 Westmorland S. 1b 563.)

== Congregationalist ==
Miller was minister at the Congregational Church, Regent Street, Oldham 1904–1908. He was minister at Bethesda Church, Runcorn, 1908–1911, living with his wife at the eight-room Manse. He had just been appointed minister of Spittal Congregational Church 1911–1912, when in 1911 he "received and accepted a unanimous call" to officiate in Hamburg.

Miller was Minister of the English Reformed Church, also described as the Congregational church, in Hamburg 1912–1914. World War I compelled him to leave. The Morpeth Herald claimed that he had completed four years there. In Hamburg he "rendered valuable assistance to his countrymen in distress." The church was closed, and he and his wife were asked by the American Consulate to work among the refugees in Hamburg. He was made treasurer of the British Emergency Relief Fund for Refugees. Alien men between 17 and 55 years old were interned, but doctors and clergy were permitted and advised to return home.

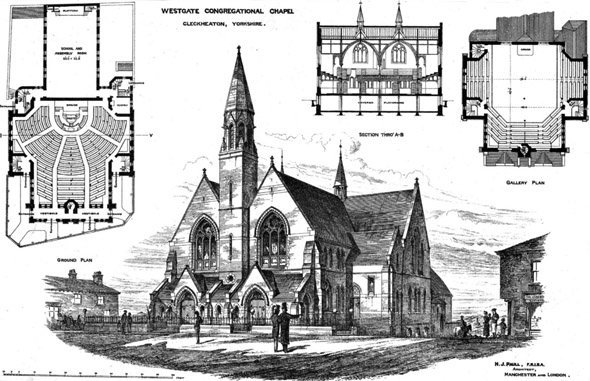
Cleckheaton Westgate Congregational Church

From May 1915 to 1922 Miller was the pastor of the Congregational Church, Morpeth, Northumberland. At his induction on 26 May 1915 there was "much rejoicing" due to his reputation as an "eloquent preacher and an earnest and energetic worker." On 8 August and 24 October 1915 the Morpeth Herald records that he preached morning and evening there. Sunday 13 May 1917 was the Pastor's Anniversary at the same church, where Miller preached morning and afternoon that day, with "special music" from the choir. On Whit Monday, 28 May 1917, he addressed a public meeting along with two other clerics at the Primitive Methodist Church, Howard Terrace, Morpeth. On Friday 17 July 1917 at Morpeth Town Hall, he gave a "limelight lecture" on the subject of food economy, under the auspices of the Food Control Campaign. On Friday 23 April 1920, Miller proposed a toast and gave a speech about Shakespeare, "far greater than England, far greater than empire", at the mayor's dinner during the St George's Day celebrations at the Earl Grey Hotel, Morpeth.

Miller was nonconformist pastor of Cleckheaton Westgate Congregational Church 1922–1929. On 4 November 1928 he preached in the morning and evening at the congregational Church in Ashbourne Road, Derby.

=== Published sermons ===
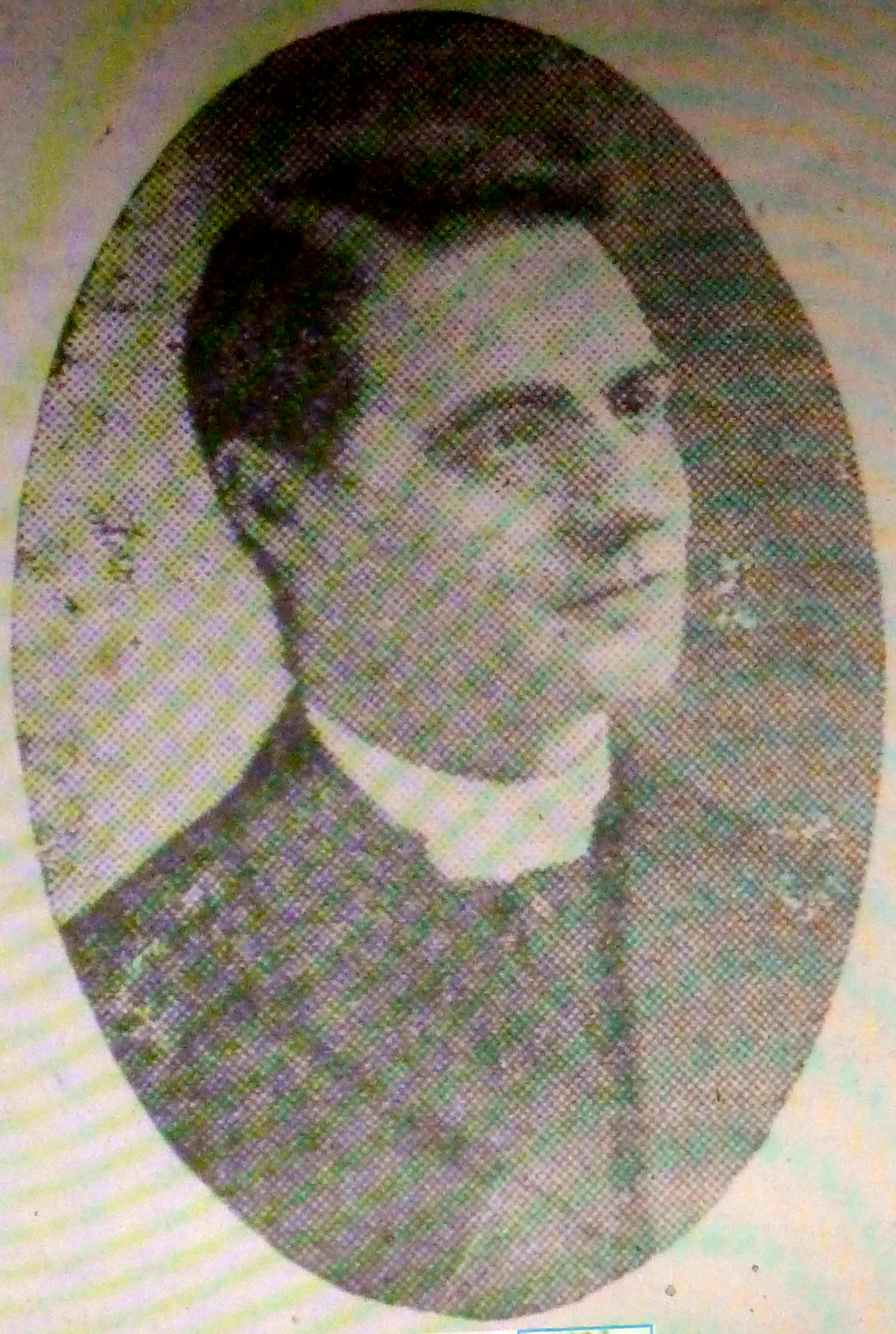
Rev. J. Miller in 1925

In 1925, while pastor at Cleckheaton, Miller published a small volume of sermons, entitled The Collapse of Christianity. The title of the book is the title of the first sermon. The United Methodist review said that:

"These discourses have nothing sensational about them, but bear the stamp of a mind clear in thought, firm in conviction, and possessing the power of infusing its own glowing warmth into the lives of others ...The book ... contains a sermon on "The Work That Counts," which has pleased the writer of these lines greatly ... The fact is, this preacher has a progressive mind with a modern outlook."

The Berwickshire News and General Advertiser said that:

"The series of sermons are marked by the work of the careful student and thinker. The optimistic note sounded in the opening sermon is refreshing ... The author's sound arguments ...admirably calculated to build up and establish in the truth ... Mr Miller is well remembered locally where his many sterling qualities, while pastor of Spittal Church, endeared him to a much wider circle of friends than those which comprised his flock."

== Anglican ==
By his announcement on 6 January 1929, he "created a sensation in nonconformist Spen Valley by going over to the Church of England." On 29 February he began a short training course at Cuddesdon College, Oxford which he completed in 1929. In the same year he was ordained as an Anglican deacon and priest by the Bishop of Wakefield. He was vicar of the Church of St Mark, Old Leeds Road, Huddersfield, and its parish 1929–1931, in association with the vicar of Huddersfield Parish Church, where he was at the same time senior curate.

He was chaplain or vicar of St James Stainborough, Barnsley, from August 1931 to November 1934, with a parish population of 500. On 5 August 1934 he chaired the 44th open-air music festival on the local cricket ground, in aid of the Beckett Hospital, Barnsley.

On 7 October 1934 he was offered the living of St Andrew's, Wakefield by the Bishop of Wakefield but did not accept it. In November of the same year he was offered the living of St Lucius, Farnley Tyas, Huddersfield, by the bishop. He remained there until at least 1939. On Thursday 28 May 1936 he was visiting Stainborough in officiate at the dedication of a new organ. On Wednesday 5 July 1939 he officiated at the funeral at Farnley Tyas of retired magistrate and brewer Thomas Edward Dickinson who was mourned by numerous businessmen, magistrates, freemasons and councillors. Dickinson had been one of Miller's churchwardens. In 1947 Miller announced his pending retirement to Stanwix, Carlisle, in his native county. However, he continued as a licensed preacher in the Carlisle diocese, then between 1950 and 1952 was curate in charge of Longsleddale, Westmorland. From 1952 to 1958 he was vicar of Old Hutton and New Hutton, near Kendal, Westmorland, finally retiring as a vicar in 1958.

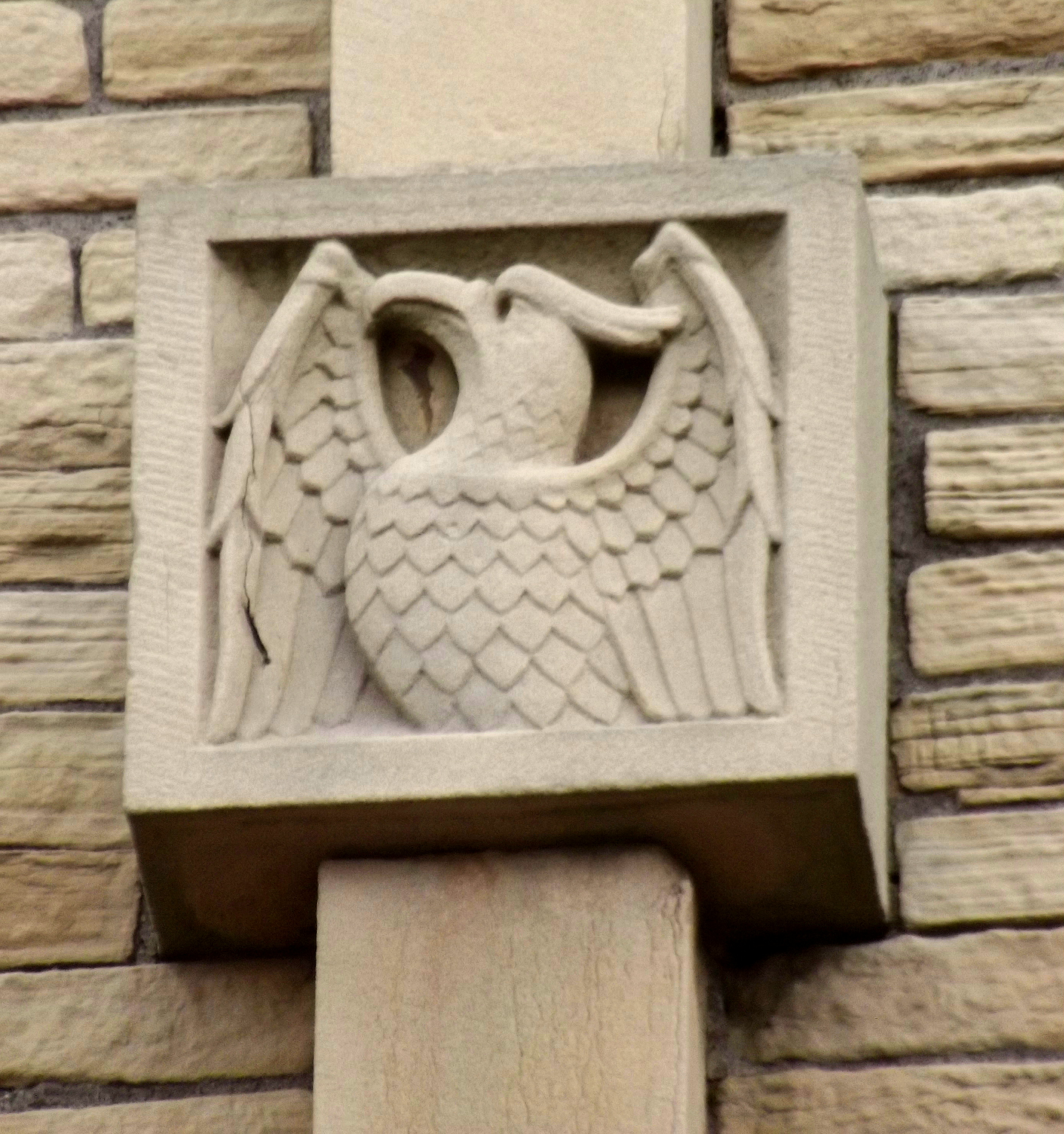
Sculpture on St Mark's, Huddersfield

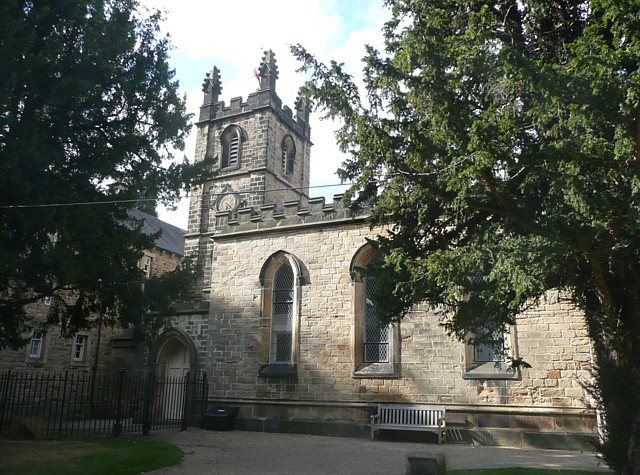
St James, Stainborough

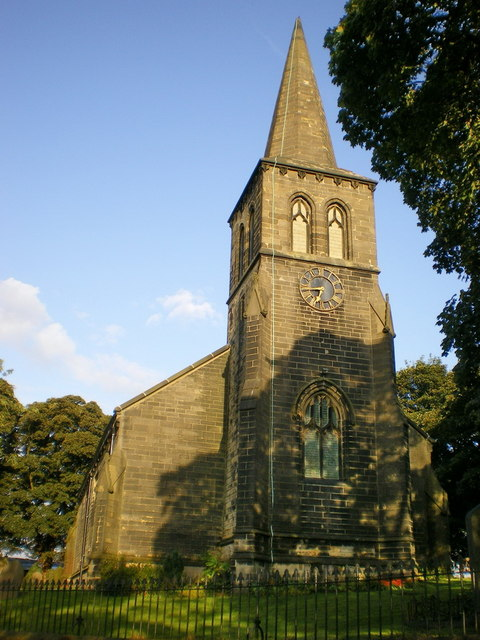
St Lucius, Farnley Tyas

St Mary's, Longsleddale

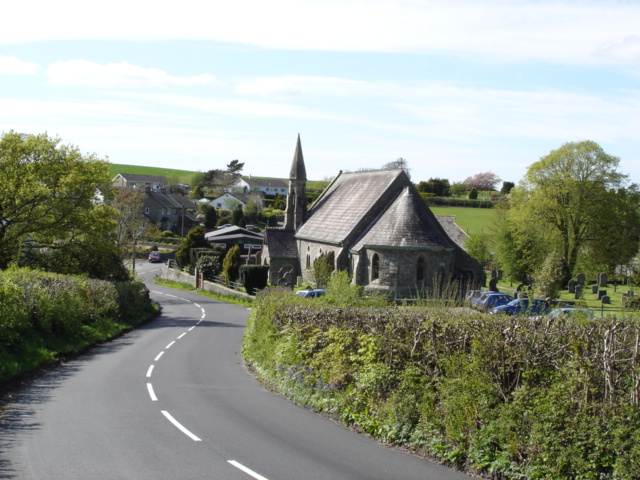
St John the Baptist, Old Hutton

== Bibliography ==
- Miller, Joseph (1925). The Collapse of Christianity. London: Arthur A. Stockwell.
