= St Stephen's Church, Bunker's Hill =

Former church in Nottingham, England

St. Stephen’s Church, Bunker's Hill
- St. Stephen’s Church, Bunker's Hill
- 52°57′04″N 1°8′12″W
- OS grid reference: SK 57997 39687
- Country: England
- Denomination: Church of England
- Churchmanship: Broad Church

History
- Dedication: St. Stephen

Architecture
- Architect: Thomas Chambers Hine
- Completed: 1869
- Demolished: 1896

Administration
- Province: York
- Diocese: Diocese of Southwell
- Parish: Nottingham

St. Stephen's Church, Bunker's Hill, also known as Trinity Free Church, was a Church of England church in Nottingham between 1859 and 1896.

== History ==
It was built as Trinity Free Church, a chapel of ease to Holy Trinity Church, Trinity Square and opened in 1859. By 1868 the church sought independence from Holy Trinity, and the church was enlarged by Thomas Chambers Hine. The Rt. Revd. John Jackson the Bishop of Lincoln consecrated the new church on 26 November 1868 as St. Stephen's, Bunker's Hill.

A detailed history of the church can be found on the Southwell and Nottingham DAC Church History Website.

== Organ ==
The organ was moved to St. Stephen's Church in Hyson Green. A specification of the organ can be found on the National Pipe Organ Register.

=== Organists ===
- E.T. Evans 1889 - ????

== Closure ==
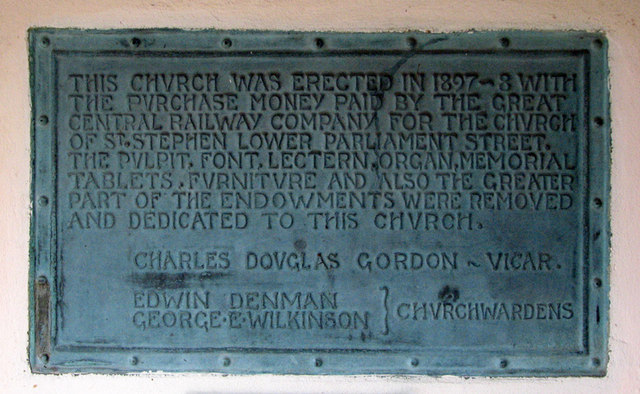
Plaque in St. Stephen's Hyson Green recording the compensation for the church at Bunker's Hill

The church was demolished in 1896 by the Manchester, Sheffield and Lincolnshire Railway (later the Great Central Railway) to make way for Nottingham Victoria railway station. The railway company paid £10,000 (equivalent to £1,150,220 as of 2025) for the church and land and the money went towards the building of a new church of St. Stephen's Church, Hyson Green. Many of the church fittings also went to the new church.

The location of the church is now covered by the Victoria Centre, which replaced Nottingham Victoria railway station.
