= St Stephen's Church, Hyson Green =

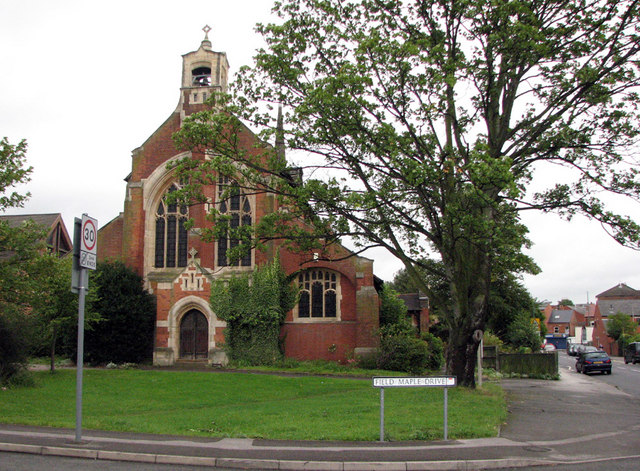
- St Stephen's Church, Hyson Green
- 52°58′07″N 1°10′31″W
- Country: England
- Denomination: Church of England
- Churchmanship: Broad Church

History
- Dedication: St Stephen

Architecture
- Heritage designation: Grade II listed building
- Architect: William Douglas Caroe
- Architectural type: Gothic Revival
- Completed: 1897

Administration
- Province: York
- Diocese: Diocese of Southwell
- Parish: Hyson Green

Clergy
- Vicar: Revd. Clive Robert Burrows

St Stephen's Church, Hyson Green is a Church of England church in Hyson Green, Nottingham.

== History ==
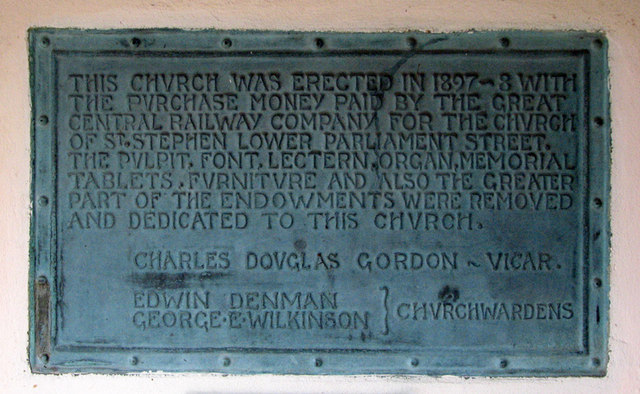
Plaque in St Stephen's Hyson Green recording the compensation for the church at Bunker's Hill

St Stephen's was the successor church to St Stephen's Church, Bunker's Hill. It was designed by W. D. Caröe and consecrated by George Ridding, the Bishop of Southwell, in 1898. A mission room and school was designed by Hedley John Price and opened in 1902.

In 1987 it was amalgamated with St Paul's Church, Hyson Green as the joint parish of Hyson Green St Paul's and St Stephen's, Nottingham.

== Incumbents ==
- 1896 – 1924 Charles Douglas Gordon
- 1924 – 1931 Bernard Parker Hall
- 1931 – 1956 Jervis Twycross
- 1957 – 1983 William Vincent Beckett
- 1984 – 1992 Glyn Jones
- 1992 – 2001 Graham Burton
- 2001 – 2009 Ruth Worsley
- 2009 – Current Clive Robert Burrows

== Organ ==
A specification of the organ can be found on the National Pipe Organ Register.

=== Organists ===
- J. Gordon Wood 1922 – 1928 (afterwards organist of St Matthew's Church, Talbot Street)
- Cecil Wyer 1928 – 1931
- Cecil T Payne 1936 – 1936
- J. Gordon Wood 1936 – 1941 (second appointment)
