= Percy Holbrook =

English priest (1859–1946)

- Canon
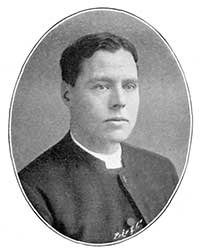
- Canon Percy Holbrook in 1892
- Church: 1883 St Mary, Islington; 1888 St Mark, Leeds Rd, Hudd; 1892 Holy Trinity, Nottingham

Orders
- Ordination: 1885 (priest) by Bishop of London

Personal details
- Born: July 1859 Reading, Berkshire
- Died: 31 July 1946 (aged 86–87) West Bridgford
- Education: Reading School; Merton College, Oxford
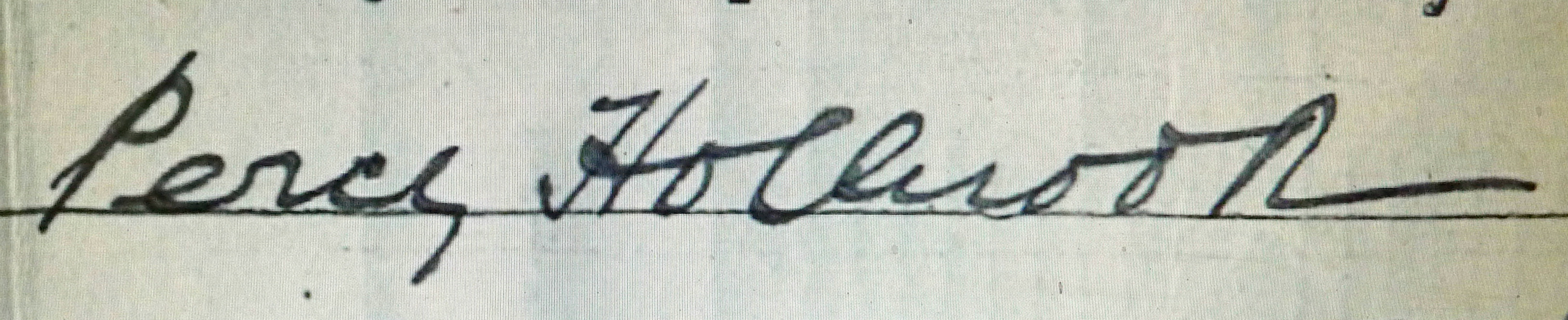
- Signature: Percy Holbrook's signature

Canon Percy Holbrook MA (July 1859 – 31 July 1946) was born in Reading, Berkshire, England, the son of a silk mercer or draper. He was vicar of the Church of St Mark, Old Leeds Road, Huddersfield, and Holy Trinity Church, Trinity Square, Nottingham, and was Hon. Canon of Woodborough in Southwark Cathedral. During his working life he chaired and supported numerous church and charitable organisations. The Nottingham Post said of him that he "had original ideas and courage to express them," and that "he endeared himself to successive generations of parishioners and citizens ... He was an eloquent preacher, a wise and gentle counsellor, and an understanding friend."

== Background ==
He was the fourth child of Charles Holbrook (born 1820), a silk mercer in Reading, in 1861 employing five men, three women and two boys. His mother was Mary Ann Maddison (born 1823). He was born in Reading in July 1859, and attended Reading School. In the 1881 Census he is with his parents and siblings at 17 Eldon Square, Reading. His father at age 61 is a master draper employing six men, two boys and thirty-seven females. His two brothers are a draper and solicitor's articled clerk, and Percy at age 21 is an Oxford undergraduate. He gained his 4th class BA in modern history from Merton College, Oxford 1883, and his MA in 1886. He was ordained deacon in 1883, and priest in 1885 by the Bishop of London.

== Incumbencies ==
=== Islington ===
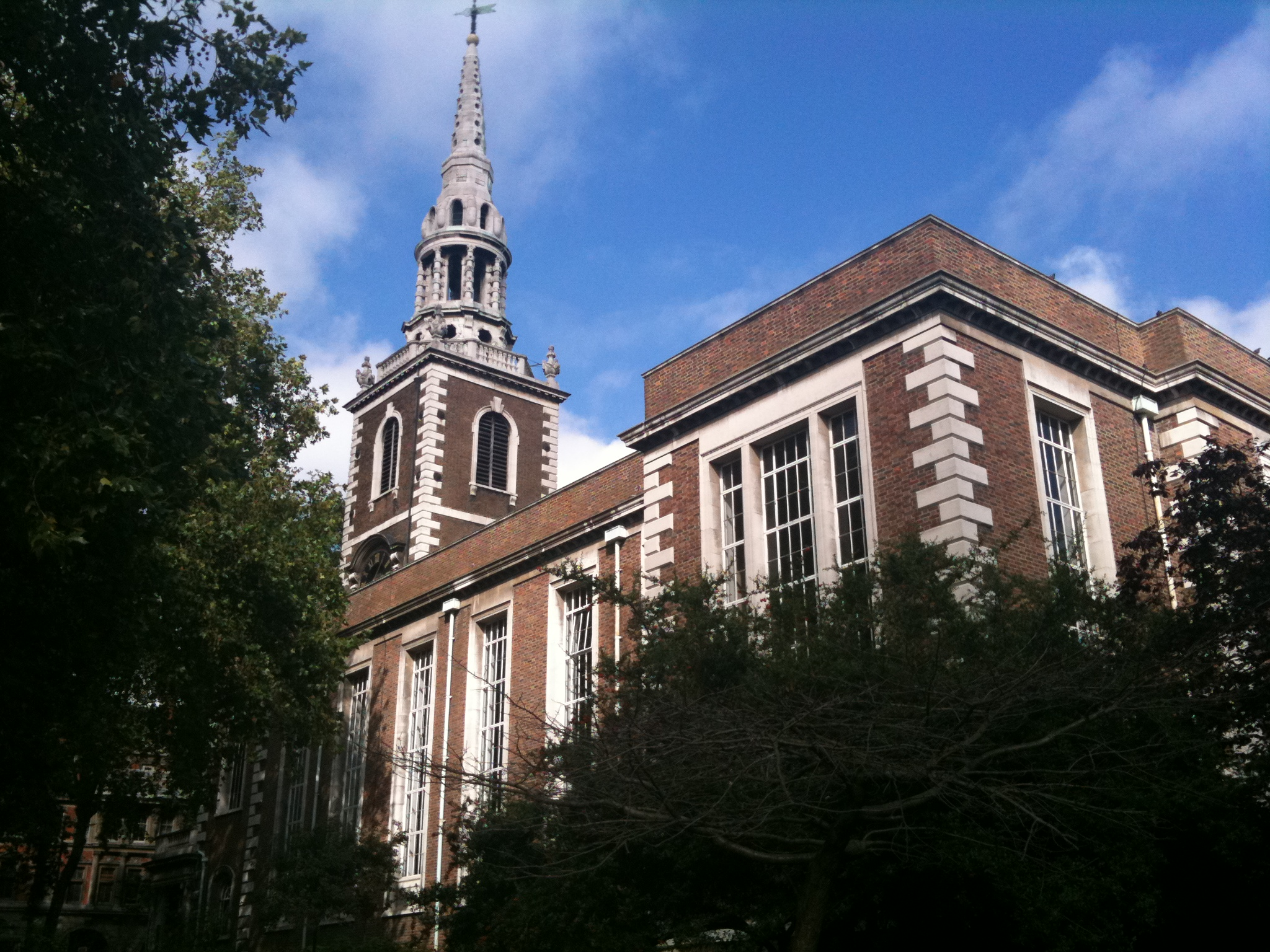
St Mary's Islington, where Holbrook was curate

He was curate of St Mary or St Mark Tollington, Islington 1883–1887, and junior curate of St Peter's Church, Huddersfield 1887–1889.

=== Huddersfield ===
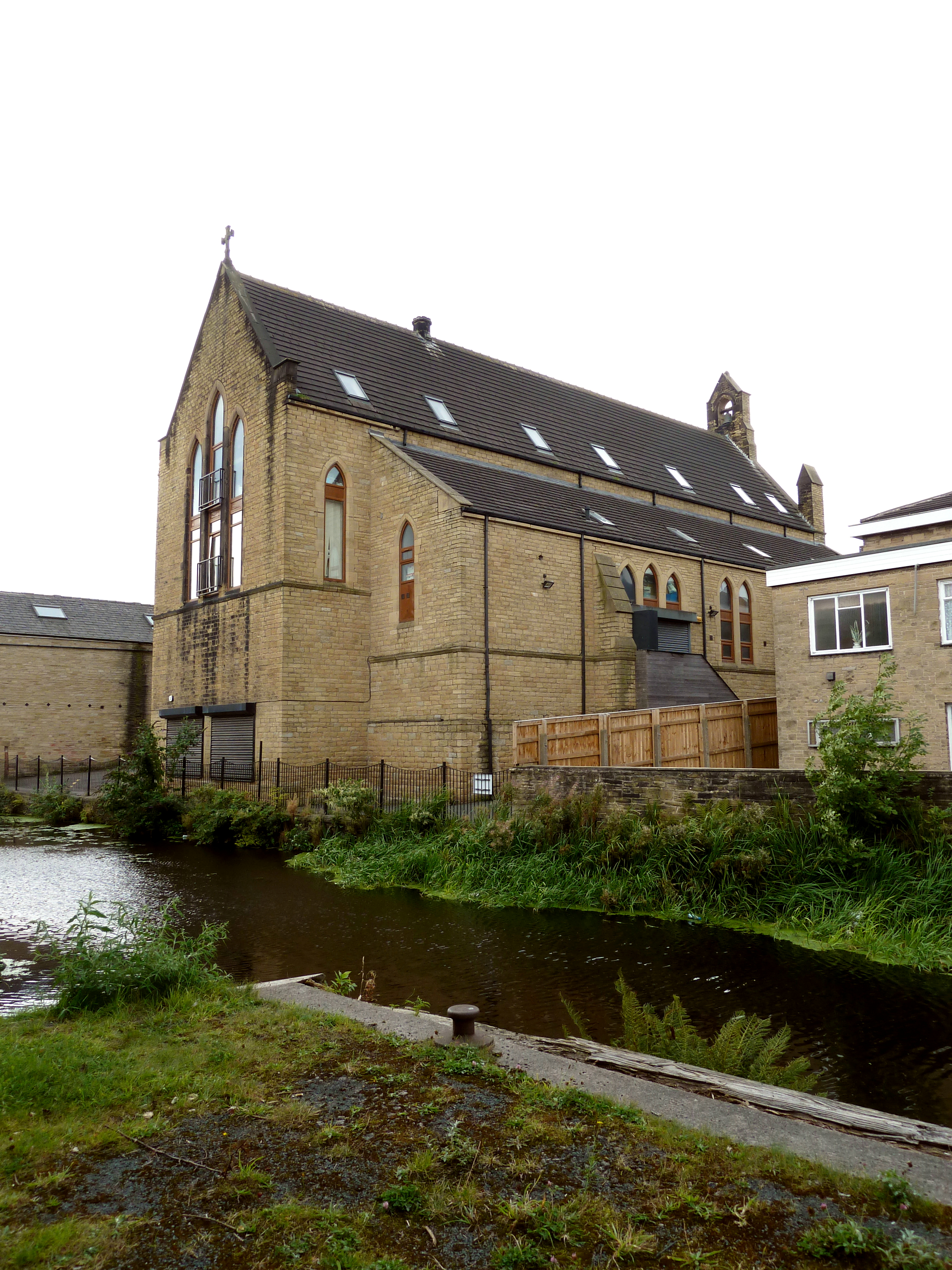
The former St Mark's, Old Leeds Road, where he was vicar

He was vicar of St Mark, Leeds Road, from Nov 1888 to December 1891. He was inducted into the post on 10 January 1889 by the Bishop of Wakefield. In 1890 his patrons were the Trustees, the first charge on the church expenses fund was £50, his ecclesiastical commission was £120 and other sources of income were £30. Gross income was £209, and the parish population was 4,500. On Wednesday 20 February 1889 he attended the opening celebrations of a four-day bazaar in Huddersfield Town Hall to raise money for the St Paul's Day Schools. On Sunday 17 May 1891 he preached at the anniversary services of St John's, Golcar. On 31 May 1891 he preached a sermon at St George's, Brockholes, on the occasion of the opening of a new organ and vestry. The United Kingdom Census 1891 finds him single, describing himself as vicar of St Mark's, and boarding at 28 George Street, Huddersfield, at the house of Annie Plowright, a widow.

=== Nottingham ===
He was vicar of Holy Trinity Church, Trinity Square, Nottingham from 1892 until at least 1933 when he retired, having effectively served there for 42 years. The United Kingdom Census 1901 finds him still single, at 22 Arboretum St, Nottingham, describing himself as a clergyman (Church of England), and living with a housekeeper and servant. He was apparently an Evangelical, since St James Gazette said on his acceptance of the post that Holy Trinity was the "stronghold of the Evangelical Party in that town." In Nottingham he held a number of public positions, including the following. He was chairman of Nottingham's Archdeaconal Committee of the C.E.T.S. and a member of the Nottingham Church Day Schools' Association. He was a member of the Nottingham Church Schools' Council, and also the chairman of the Southern District of the Nottingham Federation of Sunday School Teachers. He was chairman of the Nottingham Church Reading Society, the Nottingham branch of the Waifs and Strays Society, and the Nottingham branch of the Colonial and Continental Church Society.

== Canon ==
He was Hon. Canon of Woodborough in Southwark Cathedral from 1911, and proctor in convocation at Southwark from 1912. During his career he was at one time chairman of the Diocesan Church of England Temperance Society, and for a time he was chaplain of Southwell Clergy House.

== Retirement and obituary ==
On his retirement, Henry Mosley, Bishop of Southwell and Nottingham, said of Holbrook: "There was no man in the diocese more beloved than the Canon, not only because of the years of faithful service he had given to the parish of Holy Trinity with St Mark's and to the city of Nottingham, but because he had embodied in himself and his ministry the real characteristics of a true pastor of the Church." The Nottingham Post said: "Up to, and indeed after his retirement, Canon Holbrook had original ideas and courage to express them."

The 1911 Census finds him still single at age 51, at the same address which was possibly Holy Trinity's vicarage, since it had eight rooms. He had the same two servants living with him. He died on Wednesday 31 July 1946 at a nursing home in West Bridgford. The Nottingham Evening Post said that "he endeared himself to successive generations of parishioners and citizens ... He was an eloquent preacher, a wise and gentle counsellor, and an understanding friend."
