= Listed buildings in Silloth-on-Solway =

Silloth-on-Solway is a civil parish in the Cumberland unitary authority area of Cumbria, England. It contains ten listed buildings that are recorded in the National Heritage List for England. All the listed buildings are designated at Grade II, the lowest of the three grades, which is applied to "buildings of national importance and special interest". The parish contains the town of Silloth and the village of Skinburness. Skinburness was founded as a market town by Holmcultram Abbey in the 13th century, but much of it was lost to erosion by the sea in 1301. Silloth was created as a port by the Carlisle and Silloth Bay Railway in the 1850s, and the town was laid out on a grid plan. The listed buildings consist of houses, hotels, shops, a convalescent home, a bank, a war memorial, and a church.

== Buildings ==
Name and location	Photograph	Date	Notes
East Cote Cottage; 54.88327°N 3.37461°W	—	Mid or late 18th century	A house built in split granite boulders and split cobbles with a green slate roof. It has two storeys and three bays, with a single-bay extension to the right. The doorway and the sash windows have stone surrounds.
Marsh House; 54.89044°N 3.36080°W	—	Early 19th century	A stuccoed house on a chamfered plinth with quoins and a green slate roof. There are two storeys with three bays and a lower single-bay extension to the left. The doorway is pilastered and has a semicircular fanlight. The windows in the main part of the house are sashes in stone surrounds, and those in the extension have pointed heads.
Convalescent Home; 54.86522°N 3.39725°W	—	1829	The convalescent home was extended in 1862. It is stuccoed, on a chamfered plinth, and has pilasters, a hipped Welsh slate roof, and quoins on the extension. There are two storeys and three bays, with single-storey wings forming an E-shaped plan. The doorway and the sash windows have stone architraves and above the door is a fanlight.
5 Eden Street; 54.86855°N 3.38879°W	—	Early 1860s	A shop, stuccoed with string courses and a slate roof, it has two storeys with an attic and three bays. In the ground floor is a modern shop front. Above this, the central bay projects forward, the middle floor contains a window with a chamfered surround and a cornice, and in the attic is a round-headed sash window. The other bays contain sash windows in chamfered surrounds, and in the attic are cast iron balconies.
Golf Hotel and Kelter; 54.86874°N 3.38890°W	—	Early 1860s	The hotel and attached shop are stuccoed, on a plinth, and with a string course, a moulded cornice, and a Welsh slate roof. There are two storeys with cellars and an attic, and a shaped gable with urn finials on the Eden Street front. There are three bays on Eden Street, and ten bays on Criffel Street. The doorways are round-headed, each with a moulded arch and a tented lead hood. The windows are sashes in chamfered surrounds, and in the roof are dormers, some with flat roofs, and others gabled. The five bays to the left in Criffel Street have two doorways and a shop window. In the middle floor are three canted bay windows with cast iron balconies between them, and at the top is an open balustraded parapet.
Marine Terrace; 54.87083°N 3.38763°W		Early 1860s	A terrace of six houses, stuccoed on a chamfered plinth, with string courses, quoins, and a hipped Welsh slate roof. They have three storeys, the central houses are recessed with two bays each, and the outer houses have three bays. The outer houses have pilastered doorcases with fanlights, open pediments, and scalloped hoods on moulded consoles, which are flanked by two-light sash windows. The central houses have paired doorways with pilasters and fanlights, and they are flanked by two-storey canted bay windows.
National Westminster Bank; 54.86853°N 3.38869°W	—	Early 1860s	Originally a private house, later used as a bank, it is stuccoed, on a plinth, and has string courses, an angle pilaster to the right, and a slate roof. There are two storeys with an attic, and two bays. The doorway has a recessed stuccoed surround, and the windows are casements. In the middle floor, over the left window is a cornice on consoles, and above it is a round-headed window. A plaque states that the contralto Kathleen Ferrier lived in the house in 1936–41.
Queen's Hotel and Park Terrace; 54.87122°N 3.38751°W		1860s	The hotel and attached house are stuccoed on a chamfered plinth, and have string courses, quoins, and a hipped Welsh slate roof. There are three storeys, with five bays on Criffel Street and eight on Waver Street. The round-arched doorways have pilastered doorcases with fanlights, open pediments, and scalloped hoods on moulded consoles. Flanking the doorway on Criffel Street are three-light sash windows, the other windows being 20th-century casements in stone architraves.
Christ Church; 54.87019°N 3.38789°W		1869–70	Designed by Cory and Ferguson, the church is built in granite from Ireland. It has a chamfered plinth, and the string courses, quoins and dressings are in limestone. The roof is in Welsh slate with bands of green slate, and it has decorative ridge tiles, coped gables, and cross finials. The church consists of a nave with a clerestory, aisles, transepts, a chancel with a semicircular apse, and a west steeple. The steeple has a three-stage tower incorporating a porch, a clock face on the west side, and a spire with lucarnes.
War memorial 54.87026°N 3.38803°W		1921	The war memorial is in the churchyard of Christ Church. It is in granite, and consists of a cross pattée on a hexagonal shaft with a moulded foot, a hexagonal plinth, and a two-tiered moulded base. On the plinth are inscriptions and the names of those lost in both World Wars.
