= Skinburness =

Village in Cumbria, England

Coordinates: 54.890°N 3.362°W

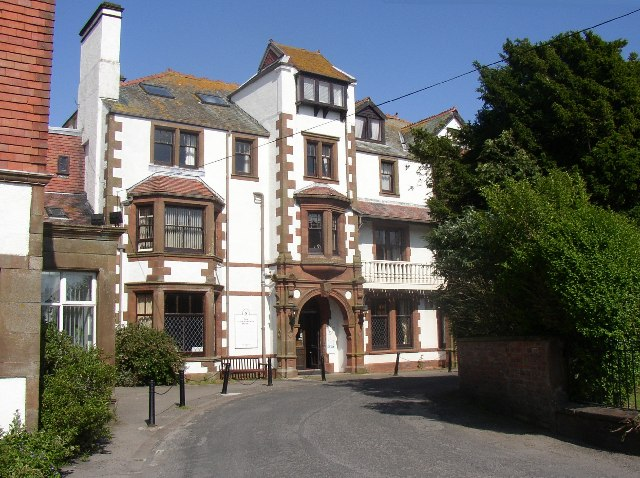
- Skinburness Hotel

- Location in Allerdale, Cumbria Location within Cumbria
- OS grid reference: NY126558
- Civil parish: Silloth-on-Solway
- Unitary authority: Cumberland
- Ceremonial county: Cumbria
- Region: North West
- Country: England
- Sovereign state: United Kingdom
- Post town: WIGTON
- Postcode district: CA7
- Dialling code: 016973
- Police: Cumbria
- Fire: Cumbria
- Ambulance: North West
- UK Parliament: Penrith and Solway

Skinburness is a village in Cumbria (historically Cumberland), England. It forms a residential area for the town of Silloth, and is about 10 miles west of Wigton.

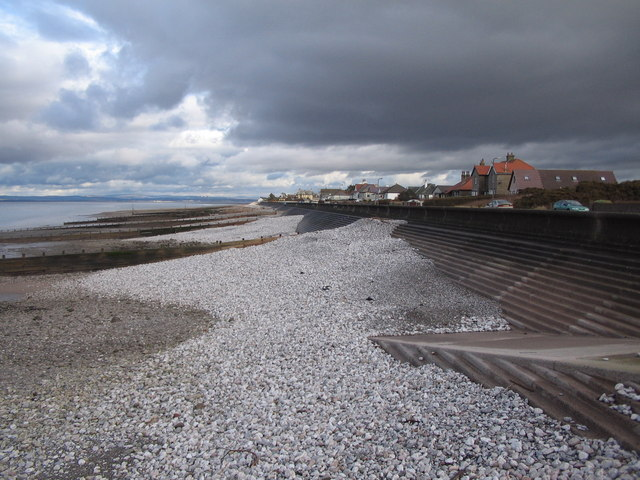
Skinburness sea wall, looking on from 150 Skinburness Road on.

The Skinburness Hotel was the most prominent building in the village, but was demolished in 2017.

== Transport ==
As of March 2026, 1 route operated by Stagecoach serves the village, the route runs to Workington via Silloth and Maryport.

== See also ==
- Listed buildings in Silloth-on-Solway
