= Holy Trinity Church, Trinity Square =

Holy Trinity Church, Nottingham
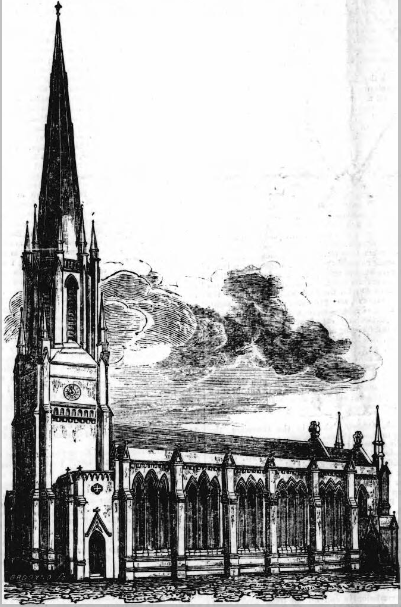
- The church as pictured in the Nottingham Review and General Advertiser for the Midland Counties Friday 15 October 1841
- Holy Trinity Church, Nottingham
- 52°57′22″N 1°8′56″W
- OS grid reference: SK 57274 40196
- Country: England
- Denomination: Church of England
- Churchmanship: Evangelical

History
- Dedication: Holy Trinity

Architecture
- Architect: Henry Isaac Stevens
- Style: Early English Period
- Completed: 1841
- Construction cost: £10,000
- Demolished: 1958

Specifications
- Capacity: 1215
- Length: 129 feet (39 m)
- Width: 64 feet (20 m)

Administration
- Province: York
- Diocese: Diocese of Southwell
- Parish: Nottingham

Holy Trinity Church, Nottingham was a Church of England church in Nottingham from 1841 to 1958.

== History ==
It was designed by the architect Henry Isaac Stevens.

It was a church in the early English style, dedicated to the Holy Trinity, was consecrated on 13 October 1841 by John Kaye the Bishop of Lincoln; its external dimensions were 129 feet (39 m) by 64 feet (20 m), and it had a square tower, on which was an octagonal lantern 24 feet (7.3 m) high, surmounted with a spire rising 29 feet (8.8 m) feet. It was built at a cost of £10,000 (equivalent to £896,960 in 2025). The living was in the gift of Trustees; and had a net income of £400.

It was built on land released under the 1839 enclosure of Burton Leys and out of the parish of St. Mary's Church, Nottingham.

In 1859, the parishioners built Trinity Free Church as a chapel of ease to Holy Trinity. This later became independent as St. Stephen's Church, Bunker's Hill.

The church was closed for a period in 1873 when a major restoration was undertaken. The chancel was lengthened by 16 feet (4.9 m) and the ceiling was decorated, the high box-shaped pews were docked, and the organ was removed from the west-end gallery to the chancel. The restoration work was carried out under the supervision of architect William Arthur Heazell at a cost of £1,650 (equivalent to £160,000 in 2025).

The spire was the tallest in Nottingham. Unfortunately, the spire was declared unsafe after the heavy bombing raid in the Second World War, although there was some dispute as to whether the bombing had caused the damage, and it was removed by October 1942. Stones from the spire were used in the new drive at St John the Evangelist's Church, Carrington when the entrance from Mansfield Road was walled up and a new drive created from Church Drive, and other stones were incorporated into a wall on the Carrington Lido side of St John's Church.

In 1954, Canon R.J.R. Skipper of Holy Trinity Church, Lenton, died in the pulpit whilst preaching.

== Incumbents ==
- Thomas Francis Penrose Hart Davies 1841–1851
- Thomas Mosse MacDonald 1851–1871
- James Allan Smith 1871–1885
- William Russell Blackett 1885–1892
- Percy Holbrook 1892–1934
- Albert Tom Cosford 1934–1936
- Robert Henry Makepeace 1936–1942
- Harry Holden 1942 – ????

== Organ ==
The organ was built by J.W. Walker and installed in 1845. It was renovated in 1873 by Lloyd and Dudgeon of Nottingham when it moved from the west end gallery to the newly extended chancel. On closure of the church in 1958, the organ was moved to Holy Trinity Church, Clifton, but no longer exists there.

=== Organists ===
- Mr. Wright ca. 1863
- Mr. Atkin ca. 1870
- W.Telford Cockrem 1871 – ???? (afterwards organist of St. Thomas' Church, Nottingham)
- Charles Rogers ca. 1884
- Mr. Hibbert ca. 1893
- Jabez Hack ca. 1910
- Vernon Sydney Read 1913 – 1920 (formerly organist of St Augustine's Church, New Basford, afterwards organist of Holy Trinity Church, Lenton)
- H. F. Dunnicliff 1925 – 1928 (afterwards organist of Limpsfield Parish Church, Surrey)
- H. Blyton Dobson 1928 – 1936
- Cecil Thomas Payne 1936 – 1940
- Stanley Bell Nolan ca. 1941
- H. A. Gascoigne ???? – 1950
- Geoffrey Knight 1950 – ????

== Closure and demolition ==
The church was demolished in 1958 and the Trinity Square site used for a multi-storey car park until 2006. This has now been redeveloped as the Trinity Square shopping centre.

The church name was preserved with the new Holy Trinity Church, opened in 1958 in the Nottingham suburb of Clifton.
