= Netherthong =

Village in West Yorkshire, England

Coordinates: 53.583°N 1.793°W

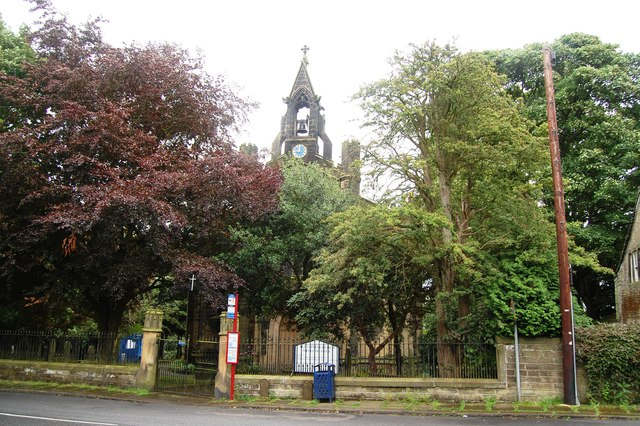
- All Saints church

- Location within West Yorkshire
- Population: 1,738 (2018)
- OS grid reference: SE139096
- Civil parish: Holme Valley
- Metropolitan borough: Kirklees
- Metropolitan county: West Yorkshire
- Region: Yorkshire and the Humber
- Country: England
- Sovereign state: United Kingdom
- Post town: Holmfirth
- Postcode district: HD9
- Dialling code: 01484
- Police: West Yorkshire
- Fire: West Yorkshire
- Ambulance: Yorkshire
- UK Parliament: Colne Valley

Netherthong is a village and former civil parish, now in the parish of Holme Valley, and the metropolitan borough of Kirklees in West Yorkshire, England. The village is near the town of Holmfirth, and on the B6107 road to Meltham from the main A6024 Woodhead Road through the Holme Valley from Honley to Holmfirth. It has an estimated population of 1,738 (2018).

== History ==
The name Netherthong may derive from Old English 'neotherra' (lower) + 'thwang' (narrow strip [of land]); since there is also an Upperthong which is situated on higher ground than Netherthong, the names could designate higher and lower strips of land.

The former Wesleyan chapel in the village was the first in the Huddersfield area. The chapel (now a private dwelling on St Mary's Estate) was opened in 1771. In 1772 John Wesley preached there; in 1757 he wrote "I rode over the mountains to Huddersfield. A wilder people I never saw in England. The men, women and children filled the streets and seemed just ready to devour us."

=== Civil parish ===
Netherthong was formerly a township and chapelry in the parish of Almondbury, from 1866 Netherthong was a civil parish in its own right, on 1 April 1921 the parish was abolished and merged with Holmfirth. In 1911 the parish had a population of 867.

== Community ==
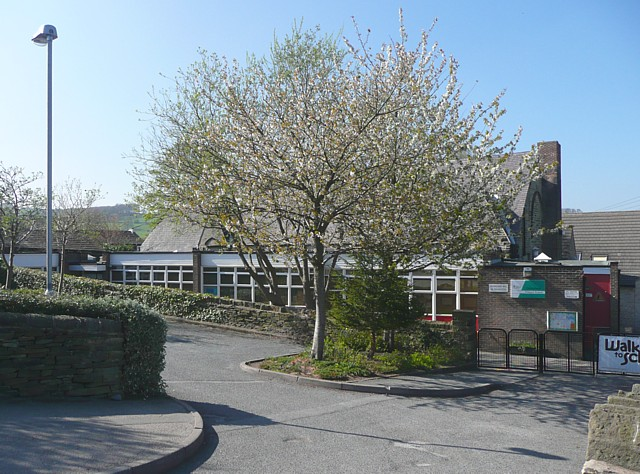
Netherthong Primary School

The village school, of 214 mixed pupils, is Netherthong Primary. Ofsted's last full inspection of December 2012 rated the school Grade 1 (Outstanding) in all areas and overall effectiveness.

Netherthong parish church is All Saints', built between 1829–30 by Leeds architect Robert Dennis Chantrell and remodelled in 1877 by William Swinden Barber. The church is part of the Upper Holme Valley Team Ministry (benefice), and within the Diocese of Leeds.

There are two public houses: The Clothiers, and The Cricketers in nearby Deanhouse. There is a village shop and newsagent which is part of the Londis chain, and a post box on Giles Street.
