= William Swinden Barber =

English architect (1832–1908)

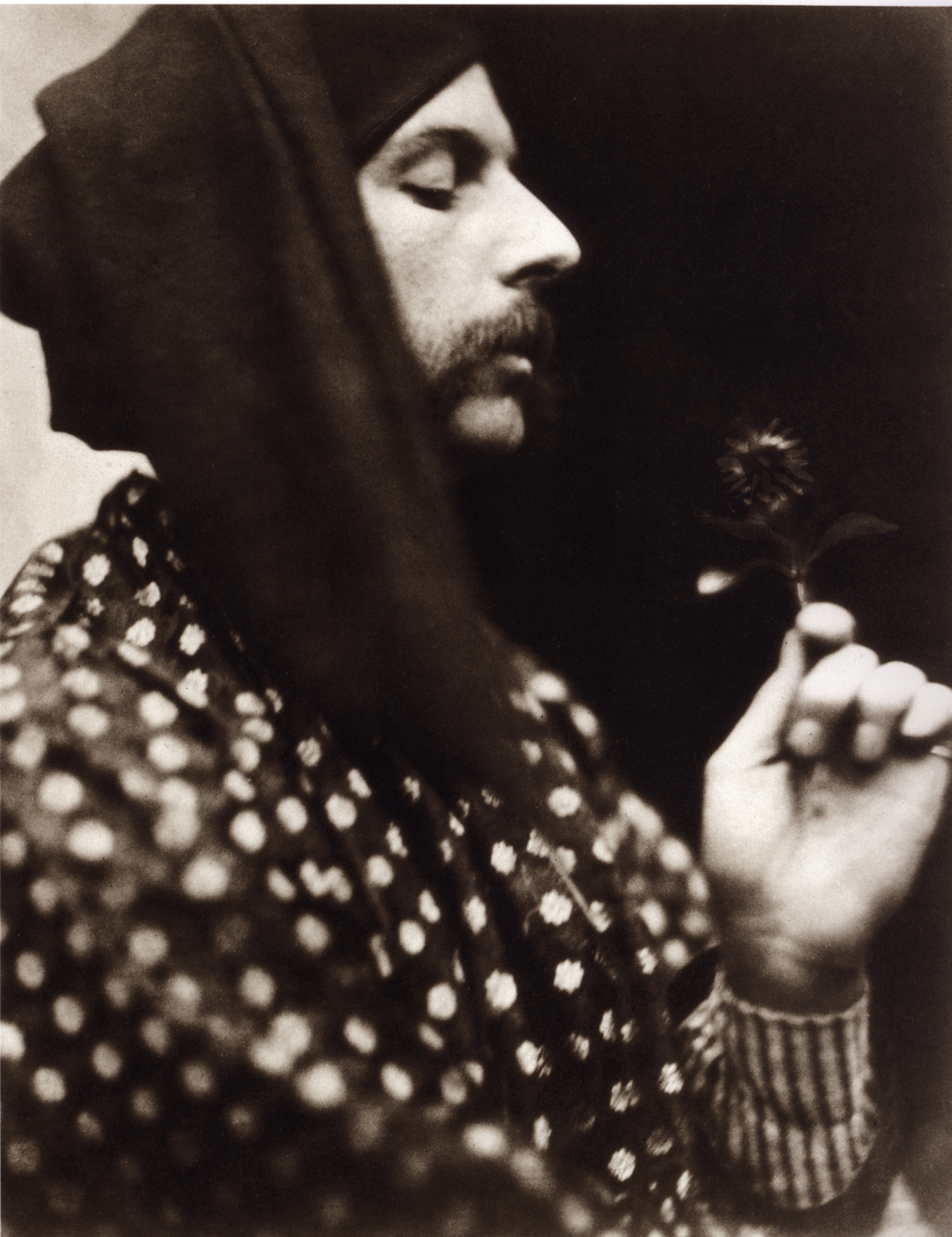
- Barber in 1864 in medieval costume by David Wilkie Wynfield
- Born: 29 March 1832; Southowram, West Riding of Yorkshire, England
- Died: 26 November 1908 (aged 76); Portsmouth, Hampshire, England
- Occupation: Architect
- Practice: Jones & Barber, 1857–59; W.S. Barber 1859–68; Mallinson & Barber, 1868–71; W.S. Barber 1871–98
- Buildings: Selected listed buildings: Civic Hall Brighouse 1866; Causey Hall Halifax 1867; Emmanuel Shelley 1869; St Thos Thurstonland 1870; Victoria Cross Ackr. 1875; St Matthew Lightcliffe 1875; St Paul Drighlington 1876; Abbott's Ladies Homes 1876; All Saints N'thong 1877; St John Warley 1877; St James New Mills 1880; St Paul Mirfield 1881; St Michael East Ardsley 1884; St John Cleckheaton 1886; St Jude Savile Park 1888; St M and AA Beckwithshaw

William Swinden Barber FRIBA (29 March 1832 – 26 November 1908), also W. S. Barber or W. Swinden Barber, was an English Gothic Revival and Arts and Crafts architect, specialising in modest but finely furnished Anglican churches, often with crenellated bell-towers. He was based in Brighouse and Halifax in the West Riding of Yorkshire. At least 15 surviving examples of his work are Grade II listed buildings, including his 1875 design for the Victoria Cross at Akroydon, Halifax. An 1864 portrait by David Wilkie Wynfield depicts him in Romantic garb, holding a flower. He served in the Artists Rifles regiment in the 1860s alongside Wynfield and other contemporary artists.

== Background ==
=== Ancestors ===
Barber's great-great-grandfather was Joshua Barber. Joshua was the ancestor of three main branches of the West Yorkshire Barber family: at Southowram, Brighouse and Rastrick. William Swinden Barber was descended from the Southowram branch, and he produced work at Brighouse and Rastrick.

Joshua's second child, baptised at Cleckheaton Independent Chapel, was John (1727–1810) who was William Swinden Barber's great-grandfather. John married Sarah Schofield and their seventh child was William.

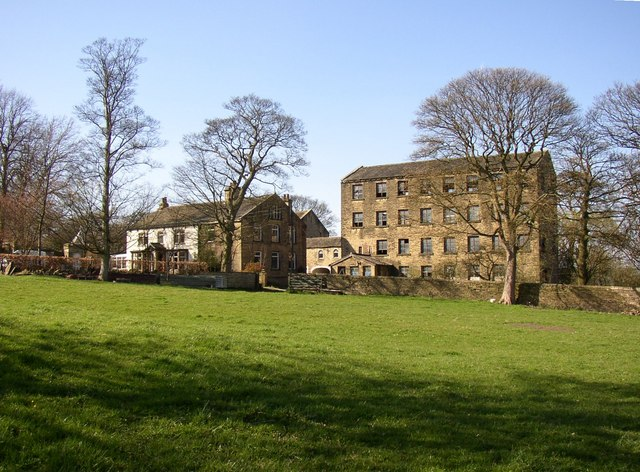
Barker Royde Mill, Southowram, built for Barber's grandfather

Barber's grandfather was William Barber (1768–1844), baptised at the same chapel. He arrived at Halifax from Mirfield around 1797 when he married Ann Charlton of Dewsbury. They had eight children, of whom John was the third. They moved to Barker Royde at Southowram and lived in an eighteenth-century farmhouse called Barker Royde Farm; it incorporates a stone on which is carved "WB 1849." Close to the farmhouse, William built a four-storey mill called Barker Royde Mill, to make carding equipment and belting for the mechanised woollen industry. This mill was constructed during William Swinden Barber's childhood, when he would have witnessed and possibly been inspired by the works. The 1841 census finds William Barber at Barker Royde Farm, aged 75 with his wife Mary aged 70 and his daughter Sarah aged 30. William and his wife are described as being of independent means. They have two employees with them: an agricultural labourer and a servant.

Barber's father was John Barber (1800–1883). On 19 April 1831 he married Sally "Sarah" Swinden (1793–1881) at Dewsbury, West Yorkshire. William Swinden Barber was their only child. In 1841 he was at Valley Top at Southowram with his wife Sarah; both are listed in the Census as 40 years of age and John is described as independent. Ann Barber, aged 25, described as a servant, is with them, but their son William Swinden Barber is absent. John was a card-maker at Southowram at Barker Royde Mill with his father William: a joint mill-owner. In 1845 he was living at Slead Cottage, Chapel Lane, Southowram. The 1851 Census finds John, a card manufacturer aged 50, and his wife Sarah aged 55 living at 38 Lark Field, Hipperholme with Brighouse, with their son William Swinden Barber, an apprentice architect aged 19. Their house servant Ann Barber is still with them. John was a card-maker; that is, he made carding equipment for the wool industry at Lark Field and at Victoria Mill, Brighouse. In 1861 John and Sarah, aged 60 and 67, were still at Lark Field. They had two servants and John was still a card-maker employing twelve men and two boys. In 1871 John was still at Lark Field with Sarah and two servants, but had retired. John and his son William Swinden Barber bought Bonegate Hall (built 1635) at Brighouse. In 1881 John a widower aged 80, now a retired card maker, was living in Hipperholme with Brighouse with one servant.

=== Barber and his wife ===
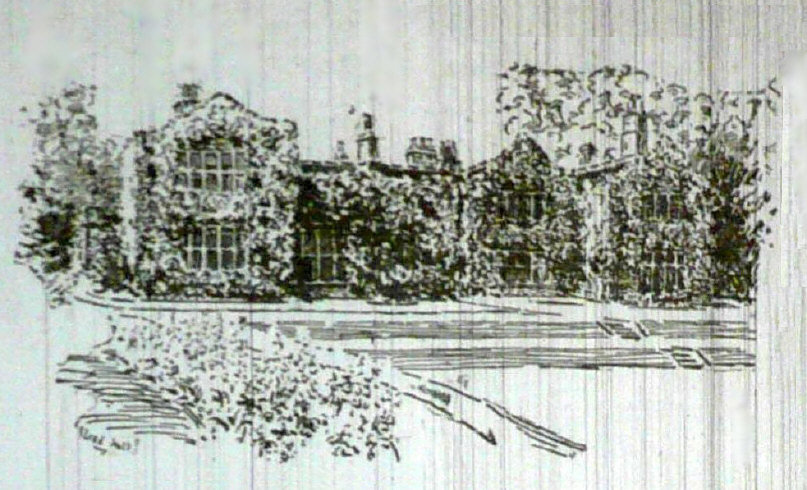
Slead Hall, Brighouse, home of Anne Byrne

Barber was baptised on 29 March 1832 at Southowram. He married Anne "Anita" Byrne of Slead Hall, Brighouse (born at Stalybridge 1829, died 1909) on 10 October 1877 at Easton Grey, near Malmesbury in Wiltshire. She was the eldest daughter of Henry Byrne. Barber died in Portsmouth on 26 November 1908, aged 76 years, and Anita died aged 80 in 1909 at Pontefract; they had no descendants.

Barber lived in London between 1857 and at least 1863. In 1860 he was living at 12 Buckingham Street, Adelphi, London WC. This is possibly the same address as Hanover Chambers, Buckingham Street, where he was living in 1861.

In 1864, at the age of 32 years, he posed for a portrait (pictured above) by David Wilkie Wynfield, who was dressing his artist friends from St John's Wood in Romantic garb and photographing them. Barber's image was described as "charming, high camp" and one of the "most eccentric" of all Winfield's images at a National Portrait Gallery exhibition in 2000.

From 1869 to 1872 he was living at Stoney Royd, Southowram, Halifax, and still owned Slead Cottage. The 1871 Census finds Barber as an architect aged 39 living at 67 Stoney Royd, Southowram, with a widowed housekeeper Jane McIvor. From 1885 to 1897 he was registered as living at Farfield House, Shaw Hill, Halifax, and registered to vote at Wike as he owned freehold buildings and land at Wike Lane there. With his father he bought Bonegate Hall, Brighouse, then he built Farfield for himself; It stands opposite the Stafford Arms in Huddersfield Road, Halifax, and has now been converted into apartments. In 1881 the head of the household at Farfield was Horace Melville Smith (1839–1915), a solicitor who became bankrupt in 1884 and escaped to Spain. In 1891 Barber was living at Farfield House aged 58 with his wife named as "Annie" aged 57 and two servants. In 1891 he owned freehold shops and dwelling houses in Briggate, Brighouse, and by 1897 he owned Lower Wike Farm. By 1898 he had moved to Letcombe, Southsea, Hampshire but still owned houses and shops in Brighouse. By 1901 he was 68, Anne was 69 and they were living comfortably at 3 South Parade in Southsea. They had a cook, parlourmaid and two servants. After Barber died at Southsea in 1908, he left £35,874 0s 3d. This was adjusted to £36,231 9s 5d.(equivalent to £3,770,000 in 2025).

== Professional life ==
He became ARIBA in January 1860, and FRIBA on 17 November 1873. He had a long career working from Brighouse and Halifax, producing designs for building and renovation work from 1855 to 1898.

=== Artistic motivations ===
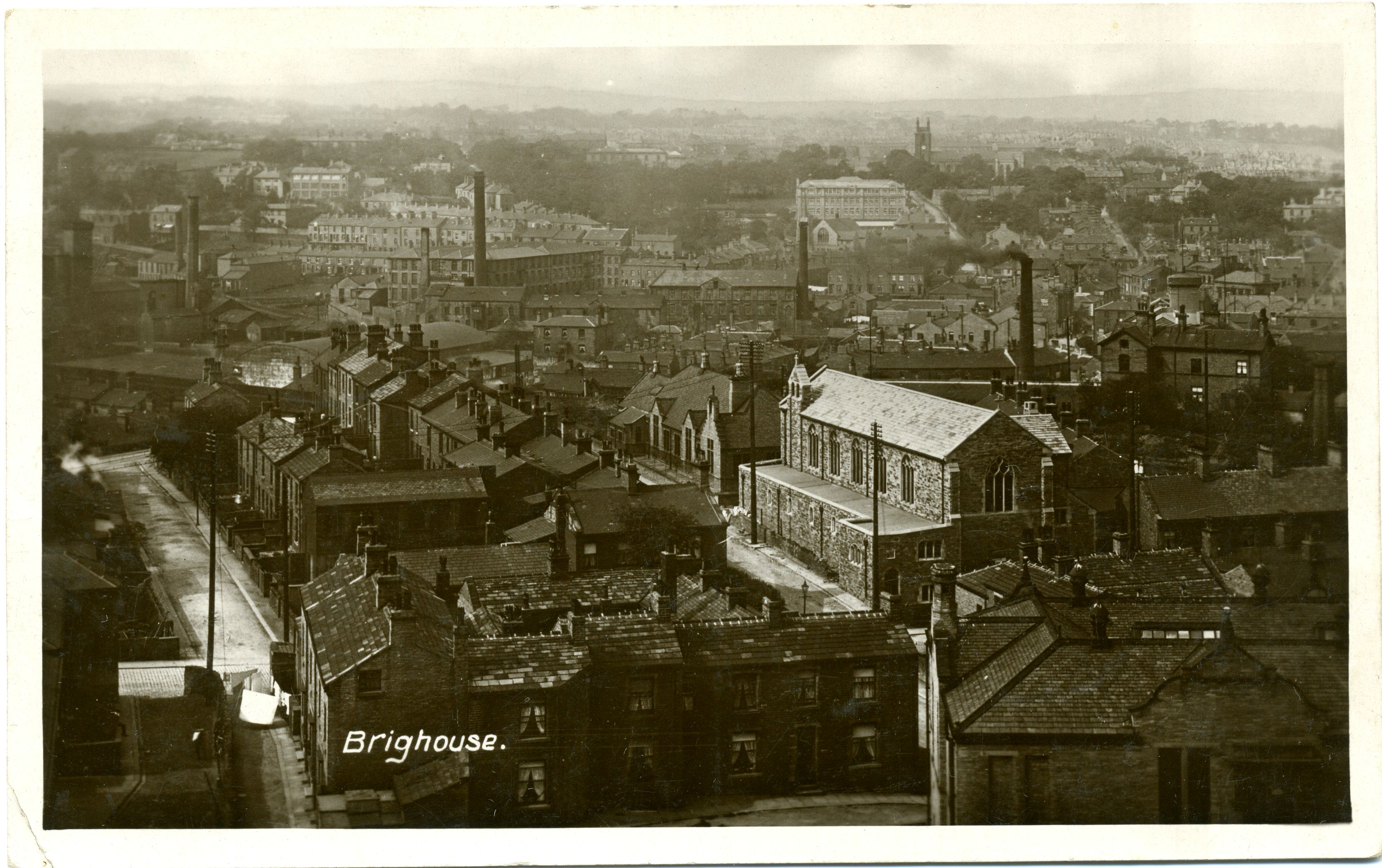
Brighouse around 1915

Neo-Gothic and Arts and Crafts artists working in Northern England in the last half of the 19th century were in some ways rebelling against the uncontrolled progress, noise, smoke, mechanisation and materialism of the Industrial Revolution. They looked back to a more spiritual Golden Age of Romantic fairy stories of magic, knights and castles, and revelled in hand-made artefacts. Many of Barber's works reflect this, with their castellated towers and interiors of elegant carvings and jewel-coloured glass, all of which he designed and commissioned himself. However, all this had to be paid for, and clients' money was often ultimately sourced from the great mills and sweated labour of Victorian West Yorkshire; an example of this is Spring Hall, Halifax, designed by Barber and funded by Tom Holdsworth of John Holdsworth & Co. Ltd.

== Works in partnership ==
He was in partnership as architect and surveyor at Hanover Chambers, Buckingham Street, London with Irish architect John Philpot Jones (1829–1873) from 1857 until 3 March 1859 when the partnership was dissolved due to bankruptcy or insolvency. In 1859 Jones' plans for Bishop Auckland Town Hall were traced and adapted without his permission. Jones later worked with William Henry Crossland from 1868 to 1872 and from 1870 with Edward Salomons. Jones was involved in designs of the Basilica of St. John the Baptist in Newfoundland, of Holloway Sanatorium near Virginia Water, Surrey and of Manchester Reform Club.

Barber then worked in partnership with James Mallinson (1819–1884) from a date between 1862 and 1868 at 9 George Street, Halifax. The partnership was dissolved by mutual consent in 1871.

The following is an incomplete list of Barber's works within partnerships.

=== Church of the Holy Trinity, Lee, London, 1863 ===
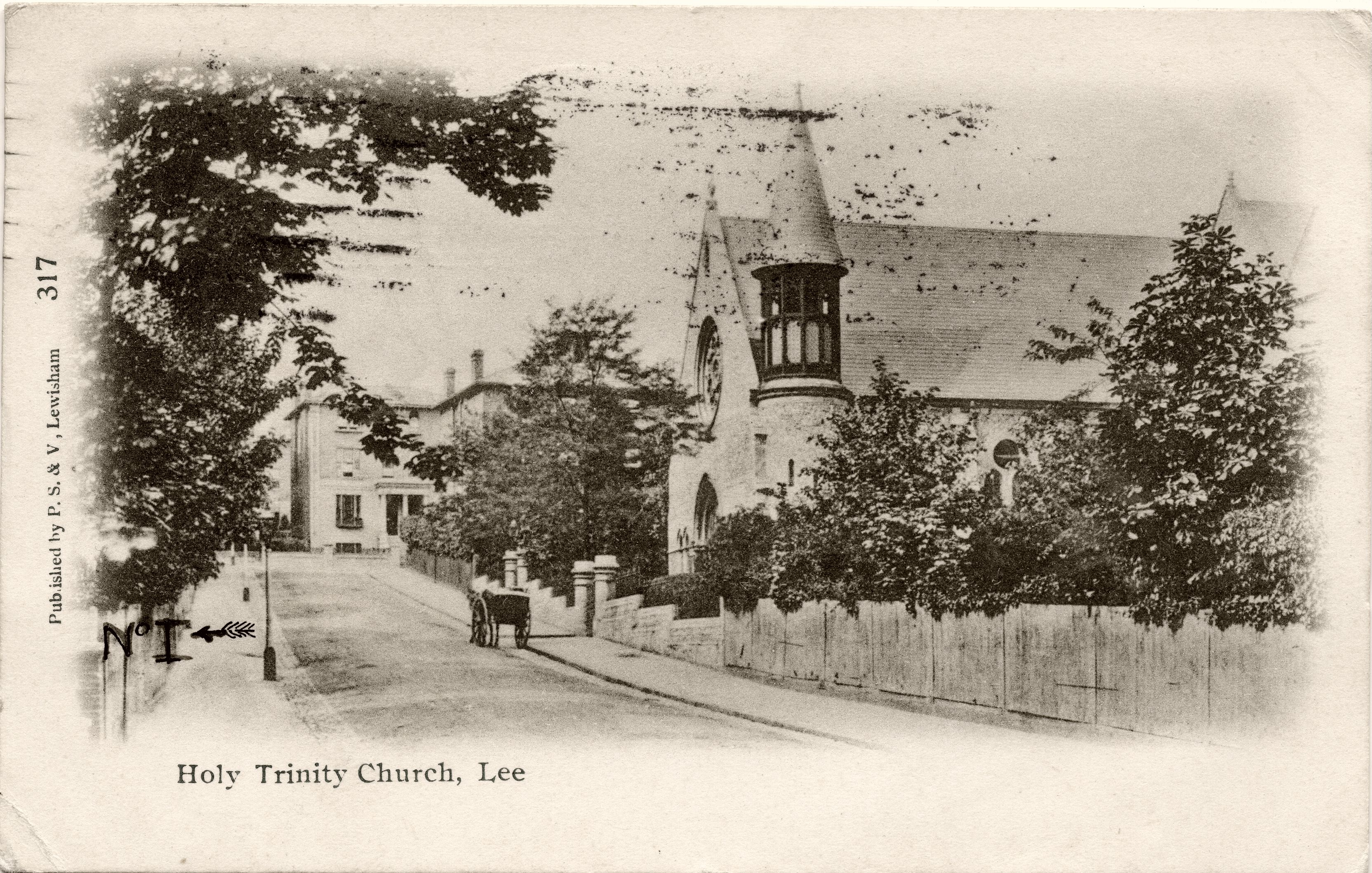
Holy Trinity, Lee

This church in Glenton Road, Lee, Lewisham, London, was designed by Barber while in partnership with Mallinson between 1862 and 1863. The church sustained war damage in 1944; it was in use until 1948, and was demolished in 1960. (Note: For images of this building please see Commons category:Holy Trinity Church, Lee, London)

=== Civic Hall, Brighouse, 1866 ===
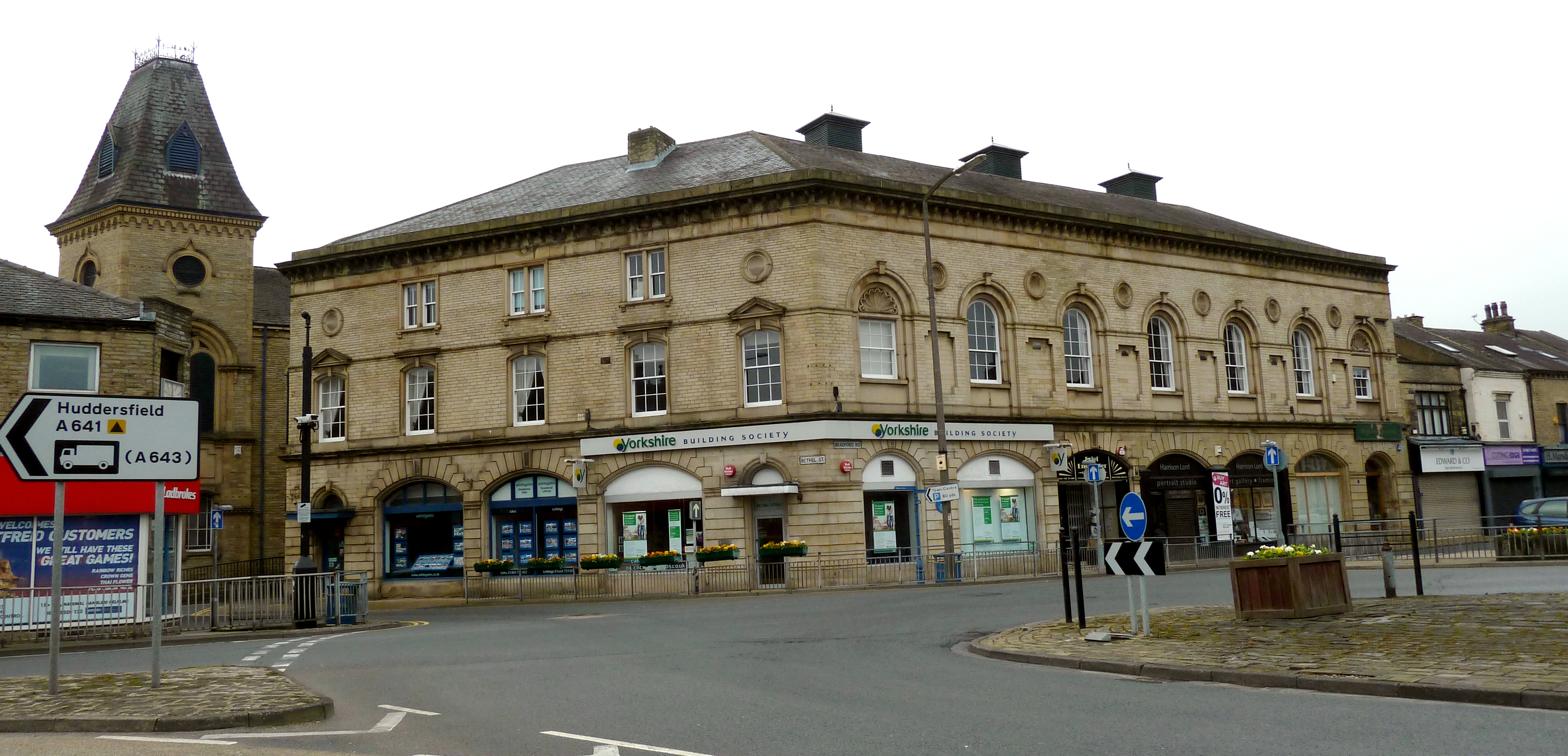
Civic Hall, Brighouse

This is a Grade II listed building. This building, on the corner of Bradford Road and Bethel Street, Brighouse, West Yorkshire, was designed in 1866 by Mallinson & Barber at a cost of £7,000 and opened in 1868 as the Town Hall and municipal offices. Also known as the Savoy Buildings, it housed eight shops in a ground-floor hall alongside Brighouse Mechanics Institute. By 1880 it had become a theatre, and by 1898 it was home to the Magistrate's Court. Between 1902 and 1959 it was the Savoy Cinema. The Council bought it back in 1960, and it became the Civic Hall in 1968. The front was restored in 1999, it was refurbished again in 2007. (Note: For images of this building please see Commons category:Civic Hall, Brighouse)

=== Causey Hall or Halifax Parish Church Day School, 1867 ===
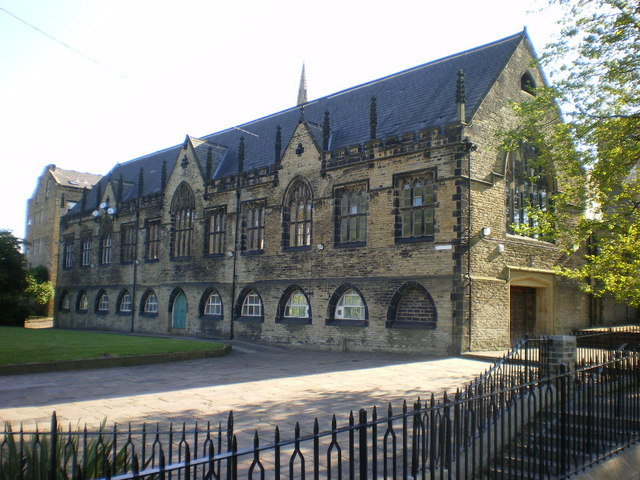
Causey Hall

This is a Grade II listed building. It was built in Upper Kirkgate, Halifax, as Halifax Parish Church Day School, and is also known as Causey Hall, or Church School, Upper Kirkgate. It stands close to Halifax Parish Church (or Minster Church) of St John the Baptist which is in Dispensary Walk, Church Street, Halifax, West Yorkshire. It was designed by Mallinson & Barber as a Gothic Revival school for 805 children at a cost of £5,000 and opened on 10 June 1867. The ground floor was a covered playground, and it had two classrooms and a 130 feet (40 m) by 28 feet (8.5 m) school hall. The school closed in 1959, and the building became a church hall and verger's flat in 1962. As of 2007 it was to be restored at a cost of £140,000. (Note: For images of this building please see Commons category:Causey Hall)

=== Church of Emmanuel, Shelley, 1865–69 ===
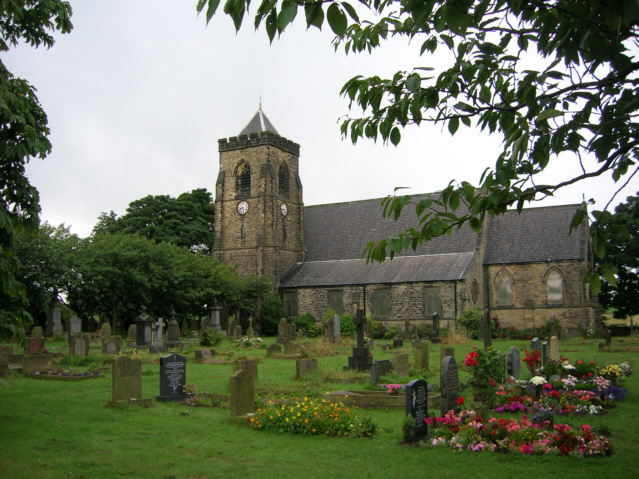
Church of Emmanuel, Shelley

This is a Grade II listed building. The design for this Gothic Revival building on Huddersfield Road, Shelley, West Yorkshire, was begun by Henry Mallinson in 1865, then completed by Barber in 1868. The church has a peal of six bells, made by John Taylor & Co and weighing a total of 43 cwt. These arrived on 31 August 1868; they were carted from Shepley railway station to the church by decorated horses, accompanied by a brass band. The bells were consecrated before the church. The inscription on the tenor bell says: "Emmanuel Church Shelley consecrated Sept 4th 1868." The church was consecrated at 11 am on Wednesday 9 September 1868 by the Bishop of Ripon, attended by 22 local clergymen. There was a peal of the new Shelley bells, an anthem by the Huddersfield Parish Church choir, and a luncheon for the faithful, followed by toasts and speeches. The building cost was £3,000, including £200 for the east chancel window, £230 for the organ and £420 for the bells. The tulip-shaped font was a gift from Charles Hey of Grice, Shelley, and in 1894 a carved oak lid was added. The masons in 1868 were Messrs Moorhouse, the joiner was James Swallow, the plumbers were Brook & Co. The painter was Mr Quarmby, William Thornton provided the heating and Abel Addy was the smith for the ironwork. It is constructed of "Hammer dressed stone with ashlar dressings and quoins" and the roof is of slate. The battlemented tower has a very short spire and shows three tiers including louvred bell chamber windows, and it has clock faces and a south entrance. The nave has a large, four-light west window, a rose window and other windows with tracery, and its main feature is the arch-braced hammerbeam roof. The chancel arch includes pairs of colonettes made of red granite on corbels.

The Shelley war memorial is situated in the lych gate. Some of the graves have been indexed. In the past, the chancel had a red and pink ceiling. (Note: For images of this building please see Commons category:Emmanuel Church, Shelley)

=== Former St James Church, Brighouse, 1868–1870 ===
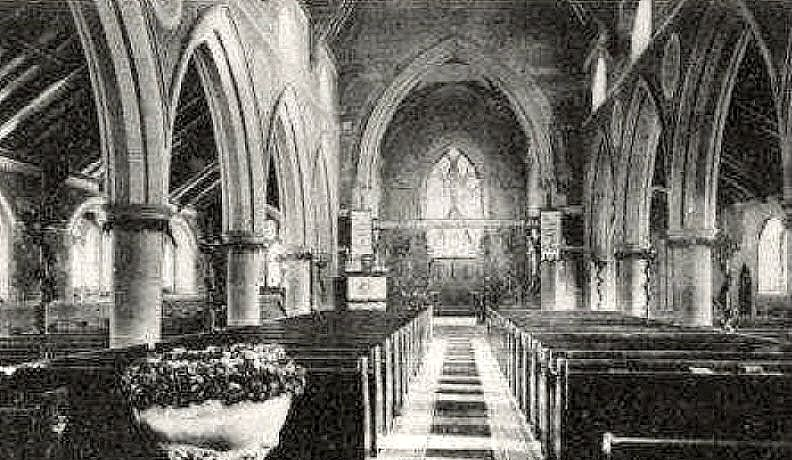
St James, Brighouse

The foundation stone of this church was laid on 25 July 1868 by Rev. Charles Musgrave, and it was consecrated on 25 February 1870. It had two 1871 stained glass windows by Edward Burne-Jones and other windows by Dante Gabriel Rossetti and Ford Madox Brown. The remains of these windows are now at Cliffe Castle Museum. When opened it had a west window with heads of four evangelists and four prophets, a bell turret, a sedilia, lectern, chancel tiles, pulpit and font. The building was demolished in the 1970s. (Note: For images of this building please see Commons category:Former St James Church, Brighouse)

=== Church of St Thomas, Thurstonland, 1870 ===
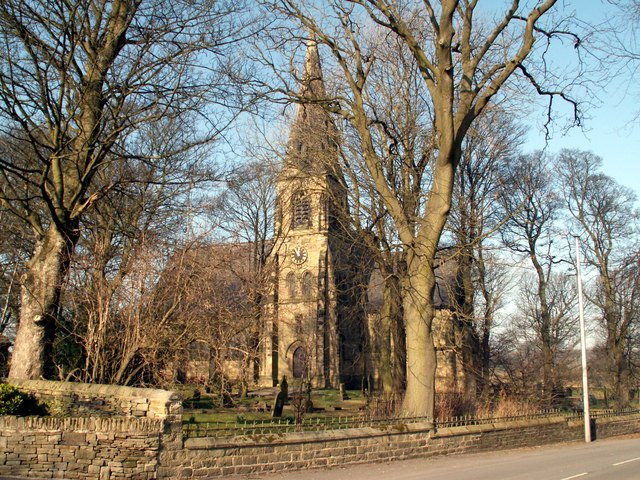
St Thomas, Thurstonland

This is a Grade II listed building. This Gothic Revival Anglican church in Marsh Hall Lane, Thurstonland, Huddersfield, West Yorkshire, was designed between 1868 and 1870 by Mallinson & Barber. It is built of hammer-dressed stone with ashlar dressing. The stone gutter of the slate roof is on moulded brackets. The tower is at the east end of the nave, and it has a stair turret and a splay-footed stone spire. Over the south door is a canopied niche with a "moulded arched head and figure" beneath. Inside there is an arch-braced hammer beam roof and an 1871 square font standing on four marble colonnettes. (Note: For images of this building please see Commons category:Church of St Thomas Thurstonland)

=== Church of St Mary, Halifax, 1870 ===
This was a Grade II listed building which had a spire. It was sited on the corner of Lister Lane and Rhodes Street, Halifax, West Yorkshire. It was designed by Mallinson & Barber to accommodate a congregation of 800, at a building cost of £10,000, and consecrated on 4 July 1870 by the Bishop of Ripon. It contained an organ built by William Hill. In 1952 the congregation was joined with St James to become the combined Church of St Mary and St James. The church was declared redundant and closed in 1986, and was demolished in 2001 and replaced by a housing development. (Note: For images of this building please see Commons category:Church of St Mary, Halifax)

=== Spring Hall, Skircoat, Halifax, 1871 ===
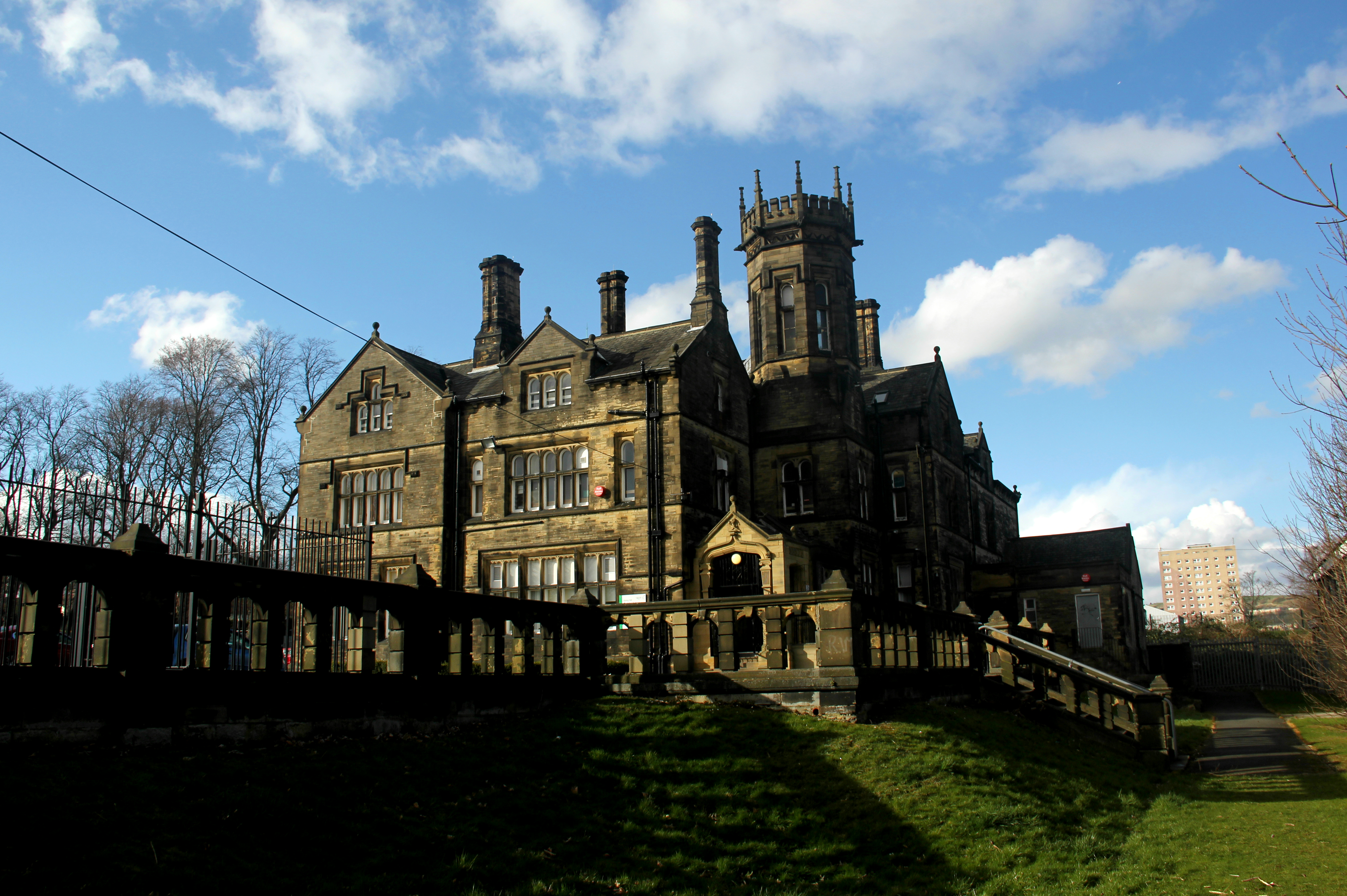
Spring Hall

This design by Mallinson and Barber was an 1871 rebuild of a 17th-century house for client Tom Holdsworth. It is located off Mansion Lane near Huddersfield Road, Halifax. By 1905 it had been bought by James Booth JP, a mill owner, then in 1916 its annexe became a World War I hospital. Between 1919 and 1931 it was a guest house for young men, owned by J. H. Whitley. It was empty until 1938 when Patons and Baldwins acquired it as a sports facility for employees. In 1948 they presented it to Halifax Corporation and its gardens became a school sports ground. The Northern Ballet Theatre Company was there briefly in 1990, then the building fell into disrepair. In 2011 the Calderdale Register Office moved into the building, and as of 2014 it remains in occupation. This building is now known as Spring Hall Mansions, and is not listed. (Note: For images of this building please see Commons category:Spring Hall, Halifax)

== Independent works ==
In 1893 Barber was working from 28 George Street, Halifax, West Yorkshire. As of 2014, bearing in mind Barber's long and prolific career, it was likely that there must be unknown works yet to be credited to his name, so the following is an incomplete list.

=== All Saints' Vicarage (now Stafford Hall), Skircoat Green, 1861 ===
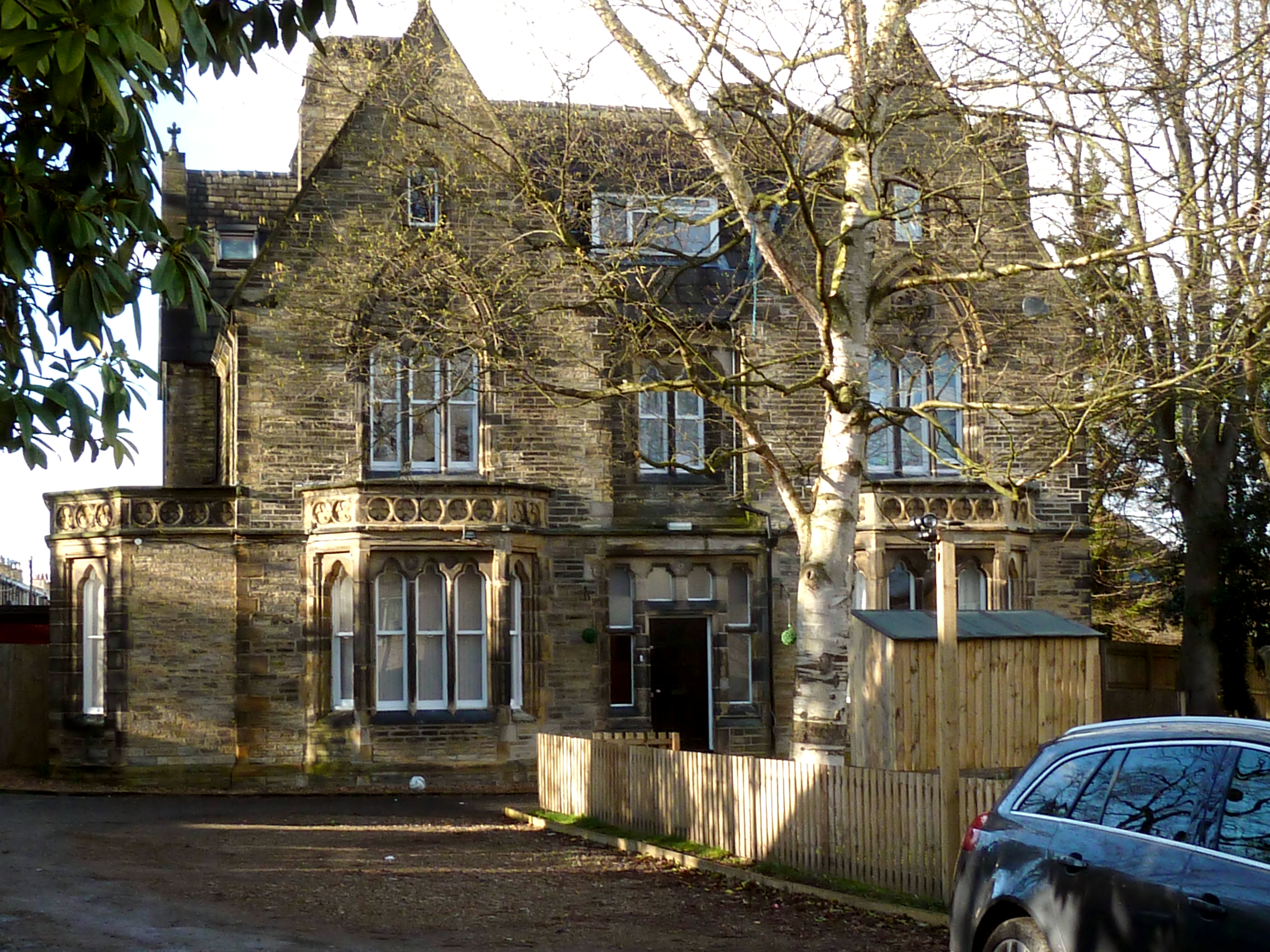
Stafford Hall, 2014

This is a Grade II listed building. There is a picture of the building on its Images of England listing page. It is situated near St Albans Presbytery off Dudwell Lane, Skircoat Green, Halifax, West Yorkshire HX3 0AT, and it was designed by Barber at a building cost of £2,300 in 1861, before Barber and Mallinson began their professional partnership. It is a large, two-storey, gabled, detached house built in Gothic Revival style of coursed stone with ashlar dressings and bay windows. The left-hand chimney stack has a panel inscribed "1861." Inside, the stairway has "bulbous turned balusters and newels plus moulded hand rail." It was later sold by the Church of England, and became Stafford Hall, then became a retirement home. As of 2010 it was under the control of Calderdale Council and had become dilapidated. By 2014 the building had been renovated and had re-opened as a children's home. There is no public access to the building. (Note: For images of this building please see Commons category:Stafford Hall, Halifax)

=== Church of St Peter, Huddersfield, 1873 ===
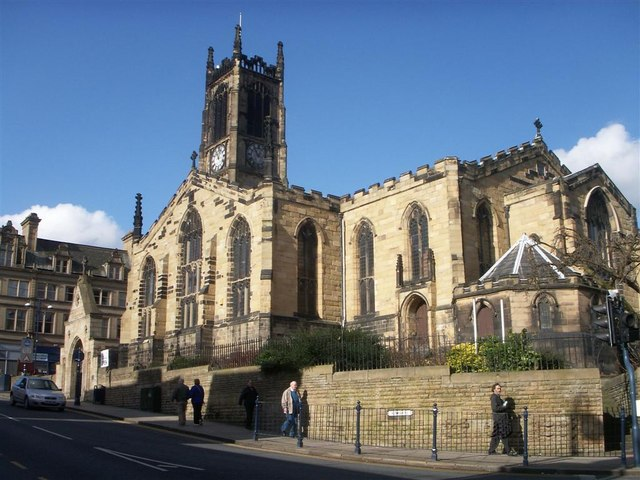
St Peters Huddersfield

Huddersfield Parish Church is a Grade II listed building on Byram Street, Huddersfield, West Yorkshire. There has been a church on this site since the 12th century, and it was rebuilt 1834–36 by James Pigott Pritchett. Barber effected an interior re-ordering of this building at a cost of £2,500 in 1873, as follows. The box pews were replaced by open and cushioned stalls, and the gallery seats were cleaned and painted. The old pulpit was replaced with one of carved oak in Gothic design. There was new flooring of encaustic tiles made by Maw's and laid by W and S Thornton of Huddersfield. John Brook of High Street, Huddersfield, did the painting; possibly decorative fresco or stencilled work. There was gas lighting by brass standards and wall brackets. The whole of the woodwork, including stalls, pulpits, screens (including the screen work in the north and south transepts) was designed by Barber and carried out under his supervision. James Christie was the sole contractor for all the woodwork, and Joseph Shaw was one of the sub-contractors for the carving, working under Christie. (Note: For images of this building please see Commons category:Church of St Peter, Huddersfield)

=== Victoria Cross at Akroydon, 1875 ===
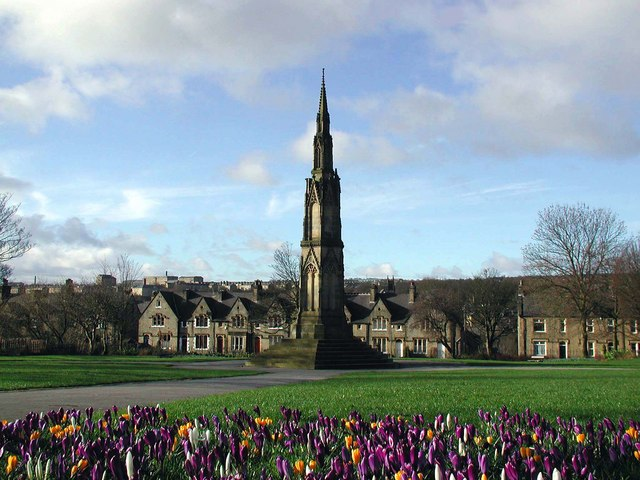
Victoria Cross

This is a Grade II listed building. Akroydon's housing scheme in Boothtown, Halifax, was designed in 1859 by George Gilbert Scott for Edward Akroyd, and Barber's monument in the central square was designed in 1873, and completed by 11 May 1877. It is designed in the style of an Eleanor cross and is dedicated to Queen Victoria and the "English constitution in Church and State." Inscribed on it is a quotation from William Wordsworth's The Excursion. The statue of Queen Victoria in coronation robes was expected in 1873 to be executed by John Birnie Philip, although he died in 1875. When completed, the square and Cross had a formal inauguration ceremony performed by Mrs Ackroyd on Saturday 29 April 1876. The dedication on the monument says: "Erected as a monument of Christian reverence for the emblem of the Cross and of loyalty to our sovereign lady Queen Victoria, by Edward Akroyd, the founder of Akroydon, 1875. Fear God, Honour the King." The monument also serves as a World War I war memorial. The first and last scenes of the 1972 BBC TV play, A Day Out, by Alan Bennett are filmed in front of the Victoria Cross. (Note: For images of this building please see Commons category:Victoria Cross monument, Akroydon)

=== Church of St Matthew, Lightcliffe, 1874–75 ===
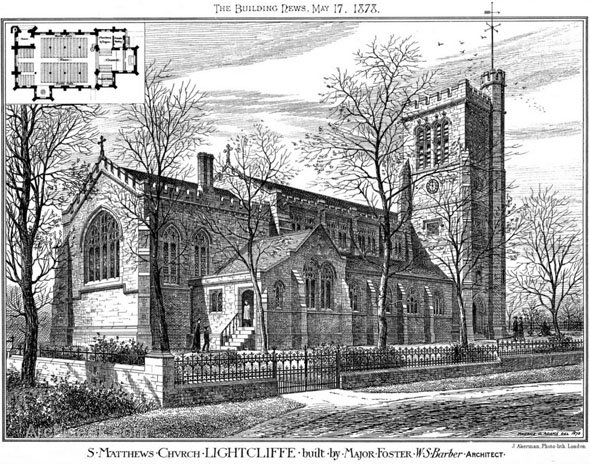
St Matthew, Lightcliffe

This is a Grade II listed building in Wakefield Road, Lightcliffe, West Yorkshire. Barber designed this church as a replacement for Lightcliffe Old Church, of which the tower remains on another site. The foundation stone was laid on Tuesday 16 September 1873, when the crane supports broke, causing injuries to several people. It was consecrated by the Bishop of Ripon on 22 September 1875. It cost £15,000 to build, and has a 98 feet (30 m) tower including the 8 feet (2.4 m) turret. The nave is 71 feet (22 m) long by 22 feet (6.7 m) wide, with aisles of 10 feet (3.0 m) wide. It has a Caen stone pulpit carved by John Birnie Philip, who also carved the reredos, and who created many works for George Gilbert Scott. James Clinsty of Huddersfield carved the font cover, and Charles Mawer of Leeds carved the capitals and other stonework. The church originally had an 1874 pipe organ by Booth & Kirkland, but this was replaced in 1905 with an organ by W. Andrews. Harry Percy Jackson carved the Watkinson Chapel and stalls. (Note: For images of this building please see Commons category:St Matthew's Church, Lightcliffe)

=== Church of St Matthew, Rastrick, 1875 ===
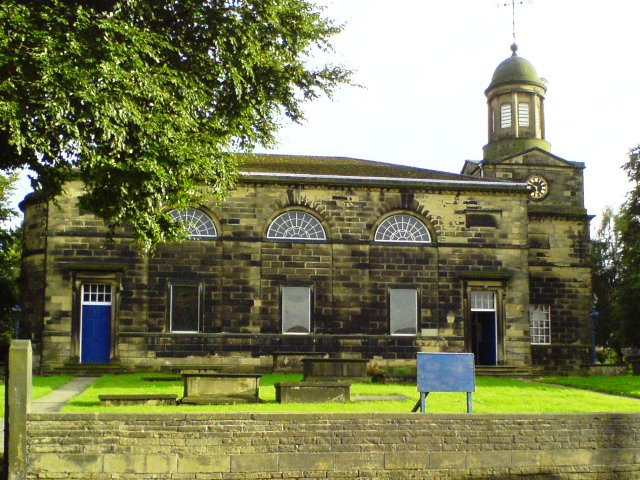
St Matthew's, Rastrick, a joint Anglican/Methodist church partnership.

This is a Grade II* listed building on Church Street, A643 road, Rastrick. Barber did not design this 1798 church, but carried out a major refurbishment in 1875. He replaced the ground floor box pews with a "sea of low-backed pews of pitch pine," although the box pews in the gallery remained untouched. "The three-decked pulpit was divided and removed to the north and South of the chancel, and a central passage was formed, at a cost of from £400 to £500." A new altar was placed in the sanctuary, and on the east wall Barber put a frieze, representing "Goodly Fellowship of the prophets and Glorious Company of the Apostles." (Note: For images of this building please see Commons category:St Matthew's Church, Rastrick)

=== Stainland Cross, 1875 ===
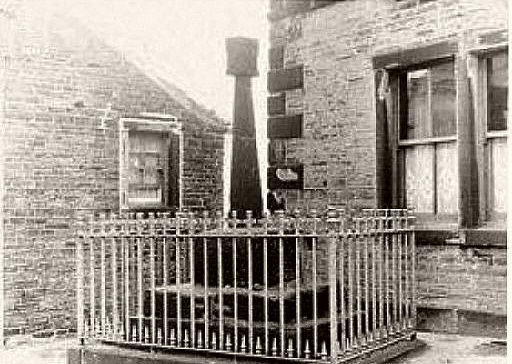
Stainland Cross before 1939

The Stainland Cross, on Stainland Road in Stainland, is a Grade II listed building. It represents a saltier or St Andrew's cross, carved on a block of stone. On 3 September 1875, The Building News published the following announcement: "The Stainland Board of Surveyors have given permission to have the ancient cross in Stainland restored according to plans by Mr Barber of Halifax." In the twentieth century the Cross was moved to a position opposite Stainland Church. The railings in old images of the Cross in its previous position, were probably added by Barber. (Note: For images of this building please see Commons category: Stainland Cross)

=== Church of St Paul, Drighlington, 1876 ===
This is a Grade II listed building on Whitehall Road, Drighlington, West Yorkshire. Barber designed this Gothic Revival building in 1876 at a cost of £7,400 as a replacement near the site of an earlier Moravian Church of 1797, which he demolished in January 1878, having possibly re-used some of the stone. It was consecrated at 11.30 am on Friday 26 April 1878 by the Bishop of Ripon who called the church "beautiful," and the Leeds Mercury commented on the attractive "plain but massive" structure. The consecration was attended by a large congregation which retired directly afterwards to luncheon in the local schoolroom, where Barber was given a vote of thanks for his work.

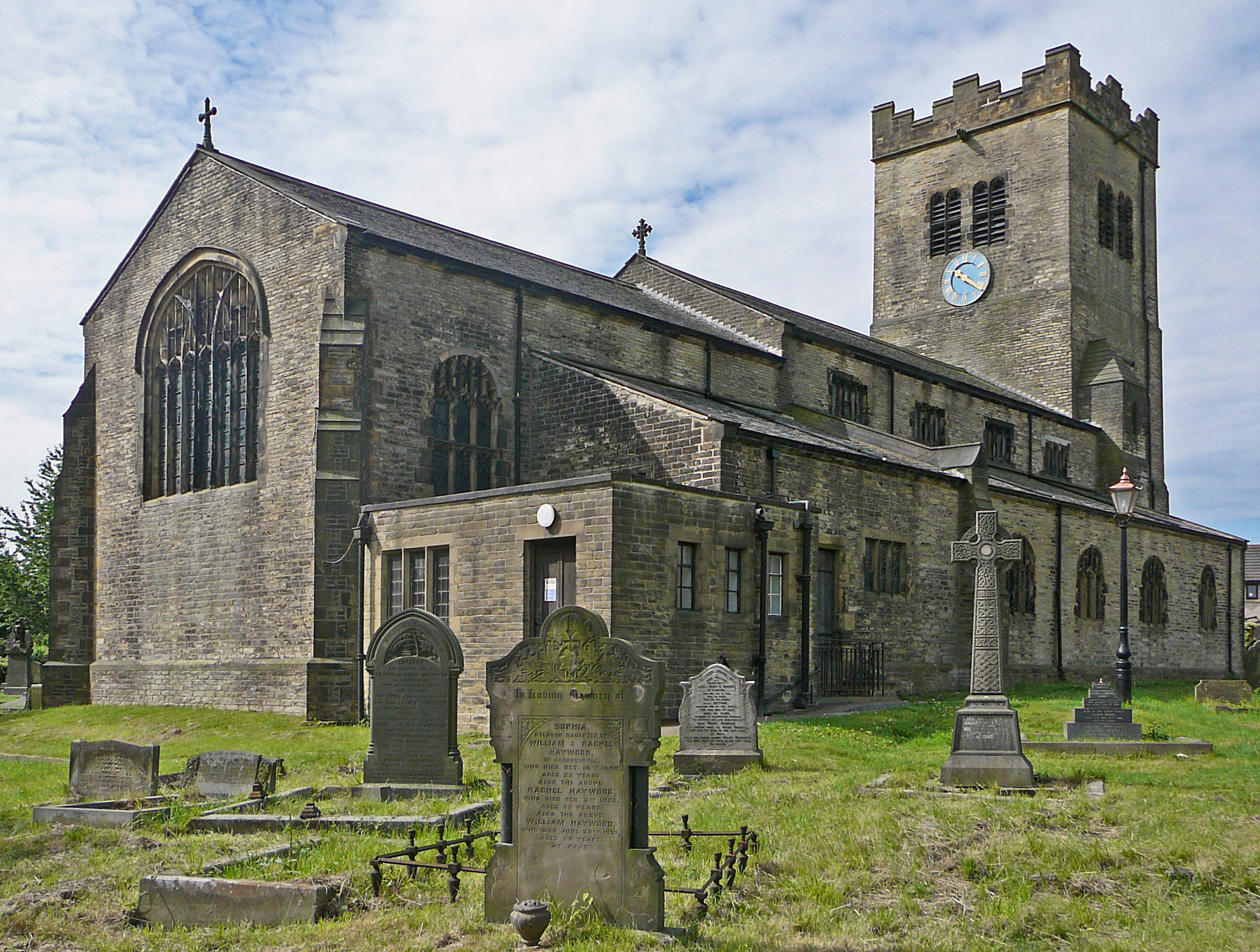
St Paul's Church, Drighlington

The church was built with a nave, chancel and north and south aisles. The nave and chancel together make a six-arch arcade, with a 22 feet (6.7 m) wide chancel arch. The west tower is 20 feet (6.1 m) square, with walls 3 feet (0.91 m) thick. The ground floor ceiling which doubles as the floor of the bell-ringers' chamber in the tower is made of heavy beams and moulded joists; this could testify to a consciousness of the fragility of parishioners and the weight of the bronze bells hanging high above. Barber designed all the original 1878 interior fittings. The nave and chancel ceilings are of open pitch pine woodwork. The interior was built in plain manner, apart from richly carved corbels supporting the chancel arch, the Four Evangelists carved over the priest's door in the south aisle and the rich bas-relief carving of the Caen stone pulpit with scenes from the life of St Paul. The pews in the nave and aisles, the choir stalls and screens were all of pitch pine, and the floor covered with plain encaustic tiles. The pews were still there in 1986. The tower contains eight bells which were cast and hung in 1880. The sanctuary was remodelled in 1928 by diocesan architect Sir Charles Nicholson. (Note: For images of this building please see Commons category:Church of St Paul, Drighlington)

=== Abbott's Ladies Homes, Skircoat Green, 1876 ===
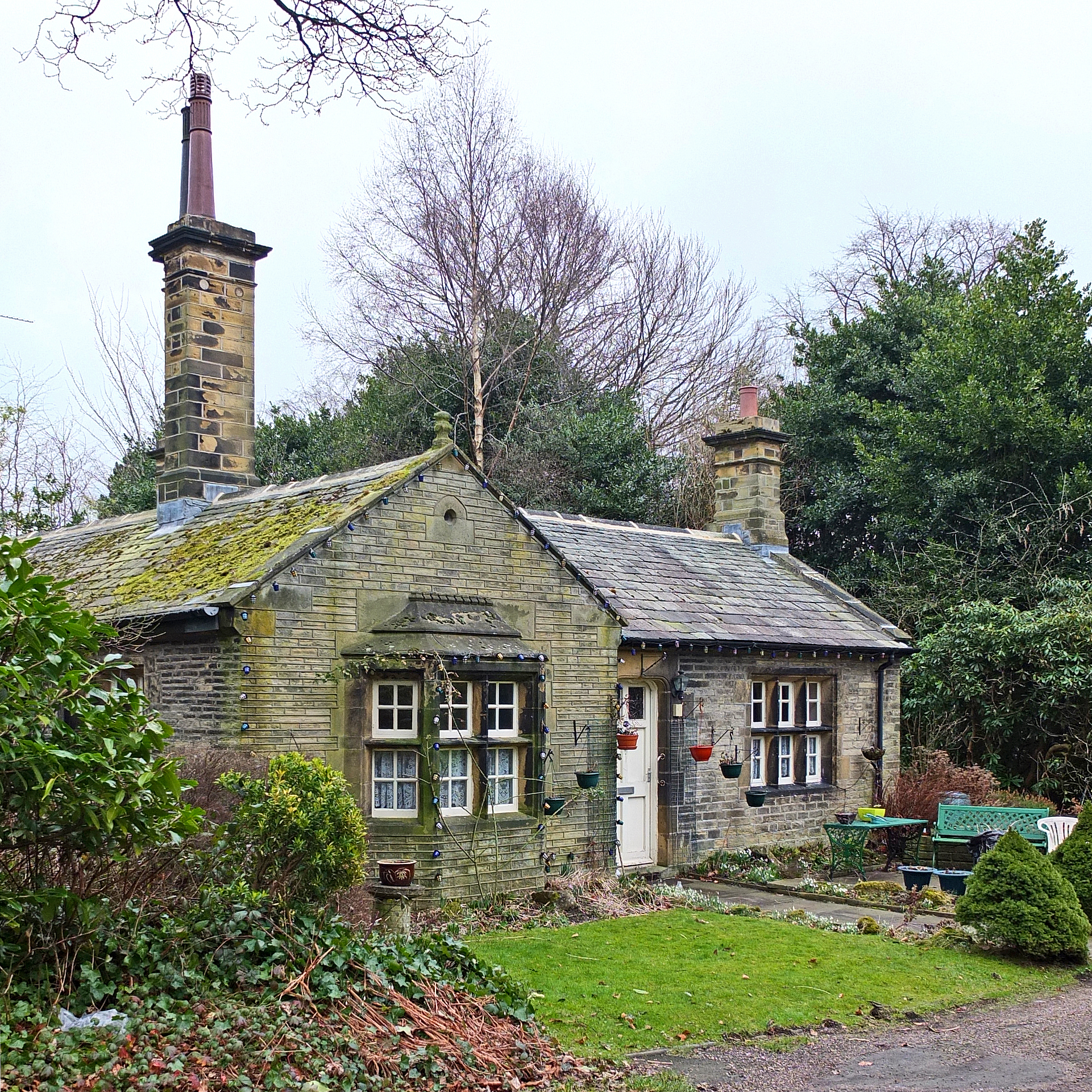
Abbotts Lodge

These are Grade II listed buildings on Skircoat Green Road, Halifax, West Yorkshire. In enactment of the Will of woolstapler John Abbott (1796–1870), twelve almshouses were built with a porter's lodge and walls and gates, all designed by Barber in 1876 at a total land-purchase and building cost of £17,880. The project was opened in January 1777. It has three tall gate piers, two pairs of gates, stone walls and ornate iron railings. The lodge is in the same style as the homes, being built of coursed rubble with ashlar dressings, and with gables and mullioned windows. The homes have tall chimney stacks and slate roofs with ashlar coped gables and finials. As of 2014 the charity was still functioning, providing accommodation for the elderly. (Note: For images of this building please see Commons category:Abbotts Ladies Homes - Skircoat Green)

=== Church of St John the Evangelist, Warley, 1877 ===
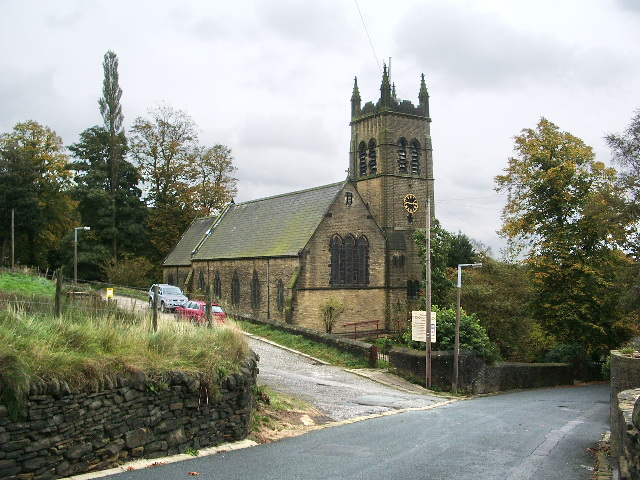
St John's, Warley

This is a Grade II listed building. St John's in Windle Royd Lane, Warley, Halifax, was designed by Barber and built between 1877 and 1878. This was a replacement for a wooden church built in 1856 in Windle Royd Lane further uphill. It was designed in Gothic Revival style for a congregation of 320–342, built at a cost of £3,930–4,000 with a church grant of £240 and consecrated in 1878. The building was planned as a nave and chancel, with everything else to the south: the nave aisle, tower, vestry and organ chamber. It is built of locally quarried sandstone with grey freestone dressings. The tower, notable for its large pinnacles, is attached to the north-west corner of the nave, with a square turret housing a spiral tower staircase to the bell-ringers' chamber only, this turret being tucked between the spire and the nave. The tower's ground floor is the church entrance, and the clock mechanism and clock faces between the ringers' chamber and the belfry were added in 1905. The chancel has an open wagon roof and the nave has closely spaced rafters. Due to the 2005 interior re-ordering, there is little left of Barber's designed and commissioned furnishings, but his floors may still exist, concealed beneath carpeting. There is an octagonal font and a round stone pulpit with "open arcading and fleurons" which may possibly be to his original 1877 design. The reason for listing is given as the exterior architecture by Barber as a local architect, and the church's position in the landscape. (Note: For images of this building please see Commons category:St John the Evangelist Church, Halifax)

=== Holroyd's Buildings, Brighouse, 1877 ===
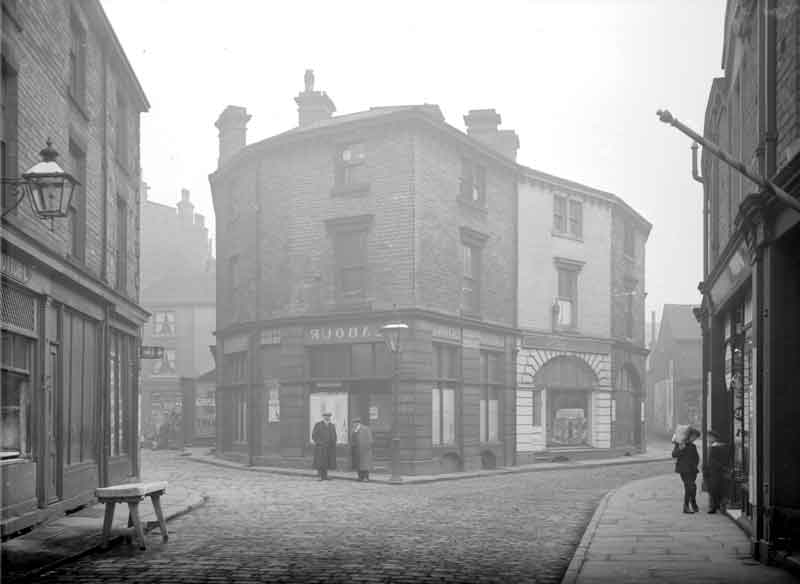
Holroyd's Buildings, 1914

Barber designed this three-storey block comprising a house and six shops for himself as a commercial enterprise in 1877. William Holroyd was the builder. Businesses and institutions using the premises included the Brighouse Conservative Club, the Brighouse Labour Exchange, Zona beer retailer, S. Wilkinson, and Hopkinson's confectioners. When Barber died, the building was sold for £2,525. In 1914 it was demolished, and Artillery Square stood in its place, to be later replaced by Thornton Square. (Note: For images of this building please see Commons category:Holroyds Buildings, Brighouse)

=== Church of All Saints, Netherthong, 1877 ===
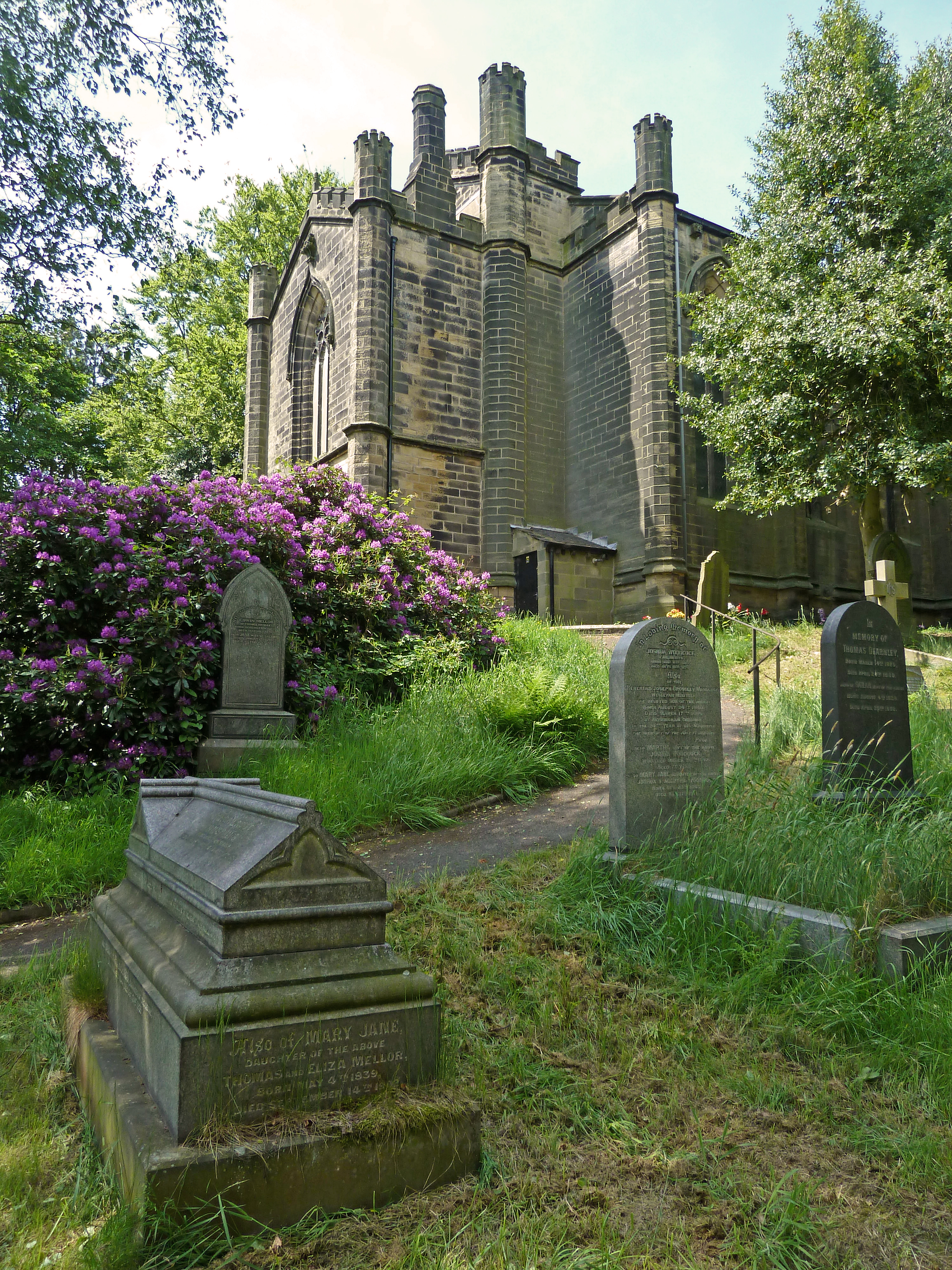
All Saints, Netherthong

This Gothic Revival parish church in Town Gate, Netherthong, Holmfirth, West Yorkshire is a Grade II listed building designed in 1830 by Robert Dennis Chantrell (1793–1872), architect of Leeds Minster. The 26 feet (7.9 m) by 18 feet (5.5 m) chancel was added by Barber and this is included in the English Heritage listing description. The chancel was consecrated on 3 December 1877 by the Bishop of Ripon, attended by a dozen local clergymen.

This was a major renovation. Barber removed the north and south galleries and the three-decker pulpit, and replaced the box pews with open seats. The old pipe organ was taken to the Oldfield Church Mission Room, and replaced at the north-east end of the nave with one by Conacher of Huddersfield. The choir stalls were moved westward from the arch, and a new "richly traceried" 9 feet (2.7 m) rood screen with a 7.5 feet (2.3 m) arched opening was installed. In the chancel were two rows of choir stalls at the sides, and behind them were an organ chamber on the north side and a choir vestry on the south side. There was a new octagonal pulpit with open traceried sides and raised upon a stem above a stepped base. There was a new and decorative chancel arch, and an open-timbered roof, of which the braces under the collar were supported on "richly carved corbels." The chancel floor was laid with encaustic tiles by Maw & Co. of Jackfield.

Barber reinstalled the original east window's stonework, and put in stained glass by Powell of Leeds. A Caen stone credence table was built into the south wall of the chancel, there was new heating and gas lighting, and all windows had been replaced. Gill & Co. were the stonemasons. Items donated by the congregation were the altar cloth, altar rails and standards, alms dish and collecting bags, brass pulpit desk and lights, oak chairs, brass lectern and a new font carved by sculptor George Dyson of Crosland Moor. (Note: For images of this building please see Commons category:All Saints Church, Netherthong)

The 1877 chancel gave occasion for a new reredos. On Sunday 27 July 1879 three special services raising £13 in collections were given at the church by the vicars of Newmill, Meltham and Linthwaite to inaugurate the reredos. The reredos was designed by Barber and carved by Cox, Sons, Buckley & Co. of London at a total cost of £130 raised by subscription from the parish. The reredos was replaced in 1920 and is now lost, but the Huddersfield Chronicle described it thus in 1879:

"It is of richly carved oak with croquets and terminals and illuminated panels, with emblems representing the Four Evangelists, the Agnus Dei and the Cross occupying the central position; the whole being further enriched by the not too frequent use of the fleur-de-lys. The dado is richly illuminated on zinc."

=== Church of St Thomas the Apostle, Killinghall, 1880 ===
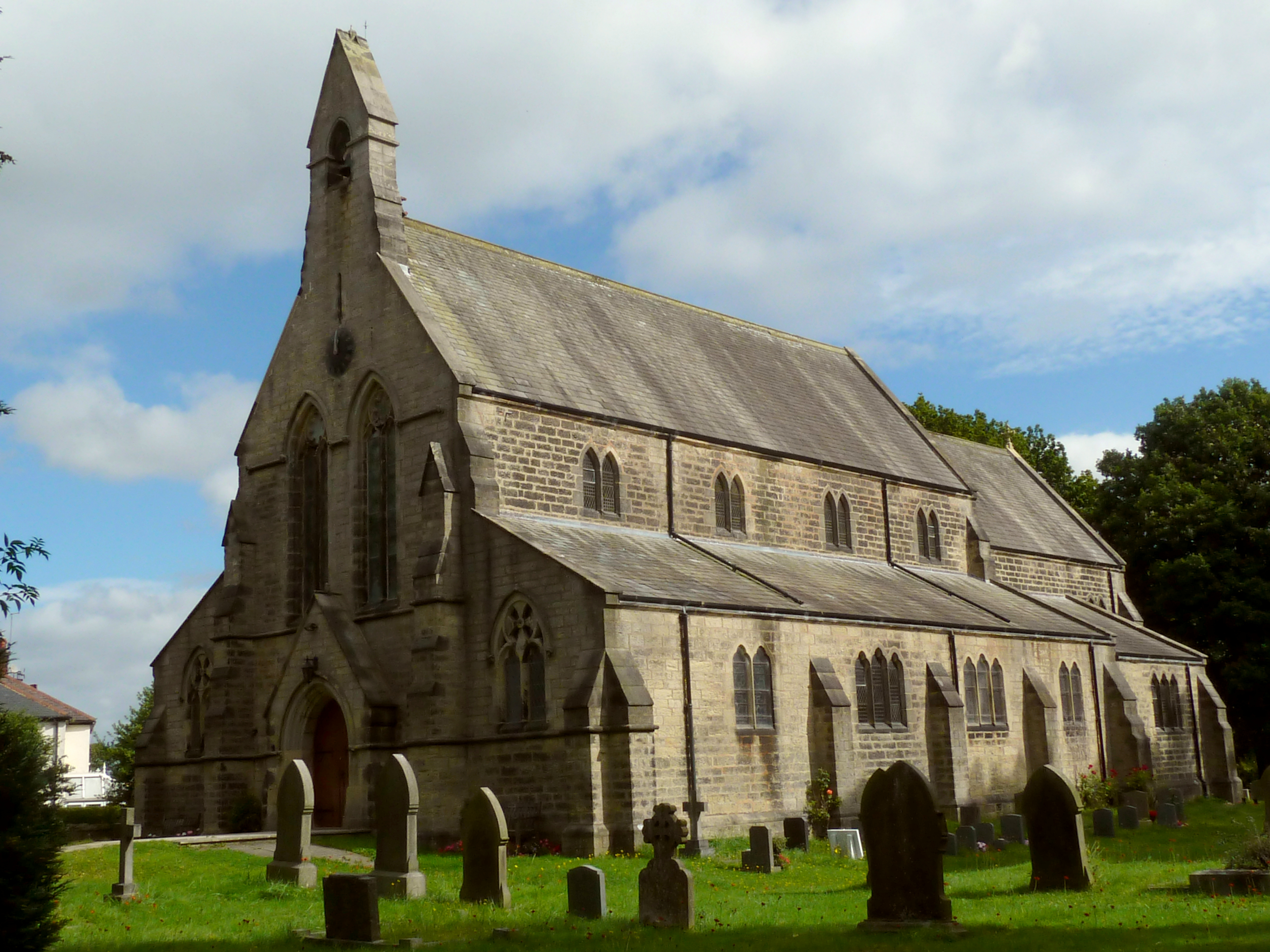
St Thos Killinghall

This is an unlisted building in Killinghall, Harrogate, North Yorkshire. It is a large building for its simple, bell-gable design. It retains its original pews, font and pulpit. It has two bells by John Taylor of Loughborough and Mears & Stainbank, plus a clock with tower mechanism. (Note: For images of this building please see Commons category:St. Thomas the Apostle, Killinghall, North Yorkshire)

=== Church of St James the Less, New Mills, 1880 ===
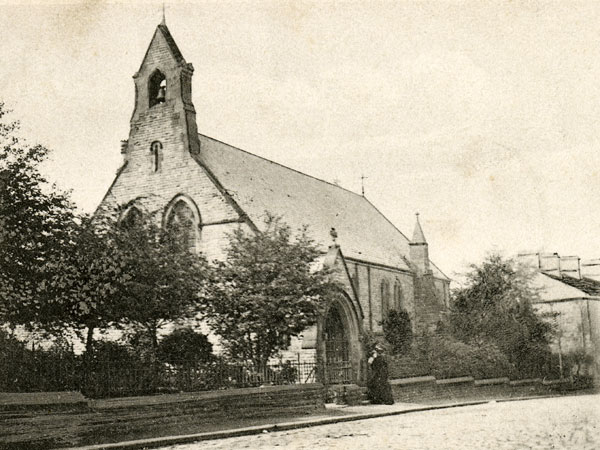
St James the Less

This is a Grade II listed building in New Mills; the associated almshouses, also designed by Barber in 1880, are also Grade II listed. Barber said he bore "ungrudging testimony to the good workmanship and willingness" of his craftsmen on this job. St James the Less, consecrated on 11 October 1880, is a decorated Gothic Revival and Arts and Crafts building in a style reminiscent of the late 13th century. The client wanted a simple building, but accepted decoration within, including windows by Charles Eamer Kempe. It is built of local stone. In keeping with Arts and Crafts principles, local craftsmen were used: stonemason Thomas Stafford and joiner Joseph Hudson. The interior wall frescoes and stencilled designs are by Powell Bros of Leeds, and this decoration may be the only existing example of Charles and Albert Powell's interior painting schemes; their primary commissions were stained glass windows. They painted the ceiling red and gold. This church at Spring Bank, New Mills, Derbyshire, was restored in 2011–2012 and is now Spring Bank Arts Centre. (Note: For images of this building please see Commons category:St James the Less Church, New Mills)

=== Methodist Church of St John, Halifax, 1880 ===
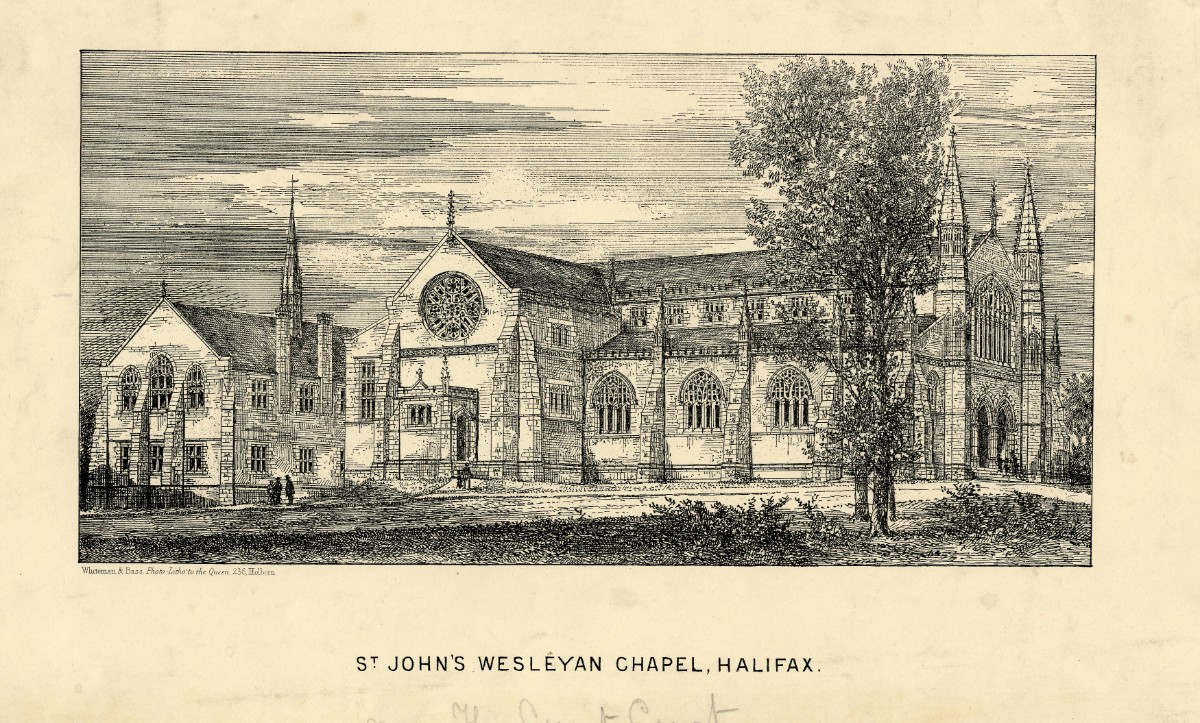
St John's Methodist church

St John's Methodist Church in Halifax, West Yorkshire, was sited at the corner of Harrison Road and Prescott Street. It was also known as St John's Wesleyan Church or Chapel, and was designed in Perpendicular Gothic style by Barber in 1880. It had a rose window and a Caen stone pulpit by Thompson of Peterborough. On 23 February 1881 the rebuilt organ was opened by W.T. Best, who was the organist at St George's Hall, Liverpool. The organ had been rebuilt by Forster & Andrews, and Barber had designed "an elaborately carved case . . . to harmonise with the Perpendicular architecture of the chapel." The building was declared redundant in 1965 and was demolished in September 1966, to be replaced by Trinity Court flats. (Note: For images of this building please see Commons category:Methodist Church of St John, Halifax)

=== Church of St John the Divine, Thorpe, 1880 ===
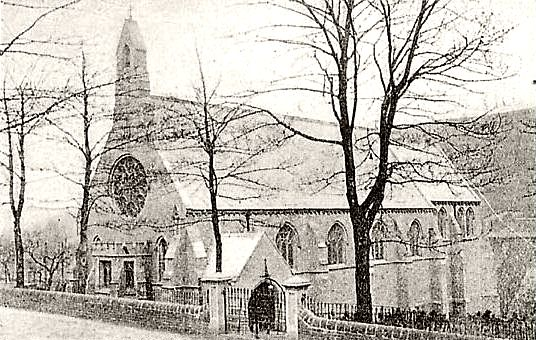
John the Divine

This was one of the first reinforced concrete churches in the UK. It stood on Rochdale Road, Triangle, Thorpe, Halifax, West Yorkshire. Barber designed it for a congregation of 300 at a building cost of £7,000 in 1880. It was consecrated on 23 September of that year. It had a carved, Caen stone altarpiece and stained glass windows by Heaton, Butler and Bayne of London. The building sustained severe fire damage in 1917; it cost £5,000 to restore, and was reconsecrated on 17 June 1923. It closed on 9 June 1968 and was demolished in 1973. (Note: For images of this building please see Commons category:Church of St John the Divine, Thorpe)

=== Church of St Peter, Hartshead, 1881 ===
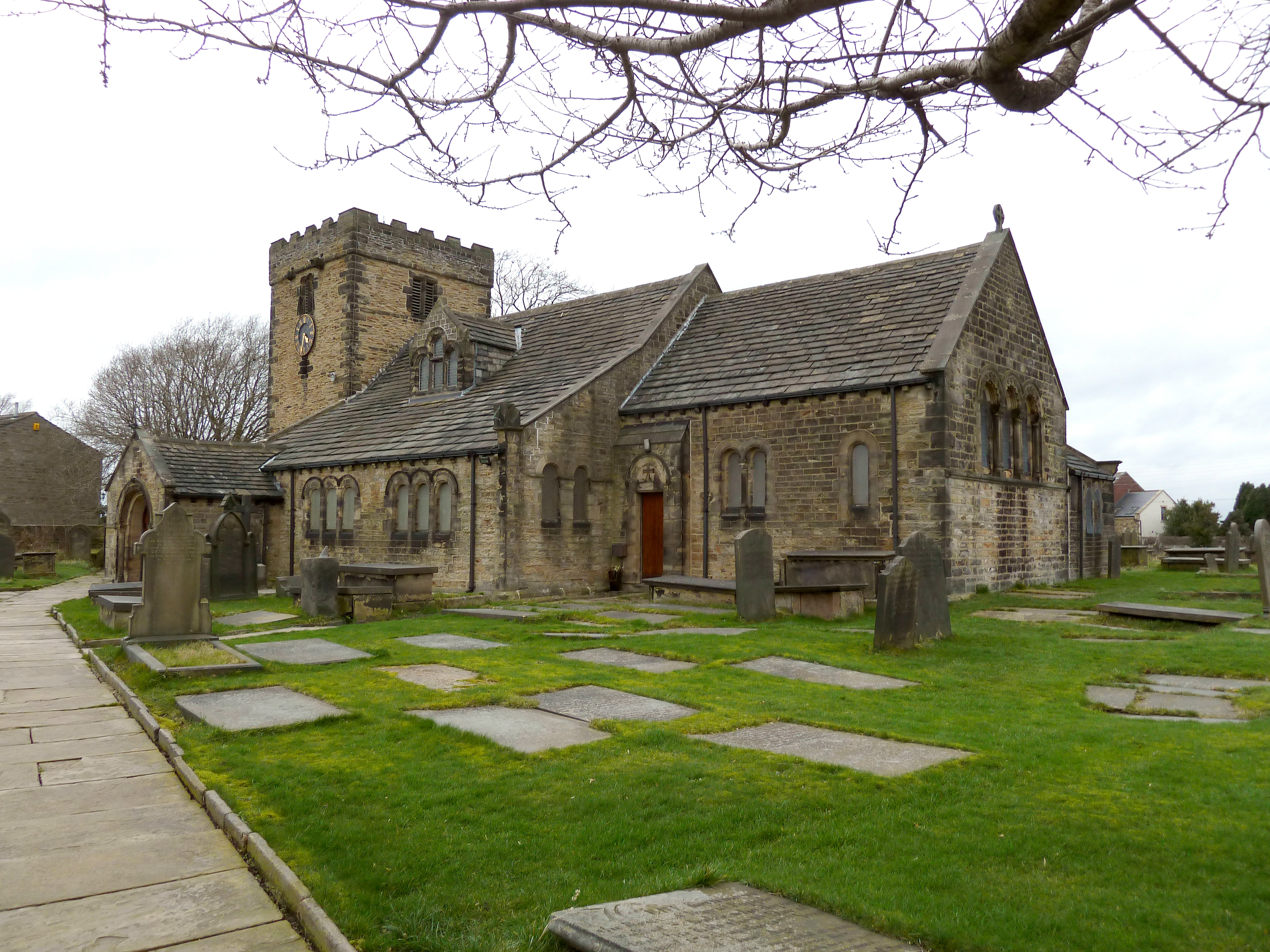
St Peter, Hartshead

This is a Grade II* listed building in Church Lane, Hartshead, West Yorkshire. This Anglo-Norman church of 1120 was heavily and completely restored by Barber at a building cost of £2,530 in 1881, and his work is included in the English Heritage listing description. The south door, the west tower and the chancel arch are original 12th century features. In the churchyard is a sundial of 1610 and a watch house or bier house of around 1828 which has been used as a school room. On the opposite side of the road are stocks; these three items are also listed. (Note: For images of this building please see Commons category:Church of St Peter, Hartshead)

=== Church of St Paul, Eastthorpe, Mirfield, 1881 ===
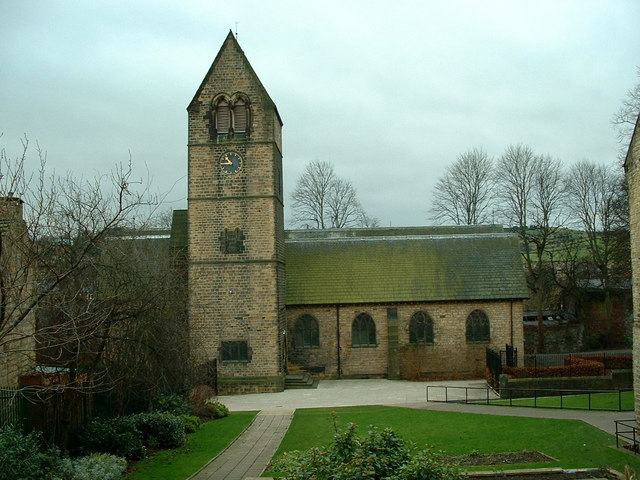
St Paul, Mirfield

This is a Grade II listed building on Huddersfield Road, Mirfield, West Yorkshire. It was designed by Barber at a building cost of £8,000 and consecrated on Tuesday 1 November 1881 by Bishop Ryan. The foundation stone was laid on 25 January 1881 by Edward Theodore Ingham, JP, of Blake Hall, in memory of Rev. Ralph Maude, a previous vicar of Mirfield. The ground plan was designed as a 97 feet (30 m) by 48 feet (15 m) parallelogram in the interior. The interior nave was designed to be 18.5 feet (5.6 m) wide, and the chancel 13 feet (4.0 m) wide. The pillars of the nave and chancel together formed seven bays, and those columns are Dalbeattie granite monoliths from the quarries of Shearer, Field & Co. The interior walls are faced with local polished ashlar wallstones. There is a porch on the south side, and a doorway on the north side through the tower. Originally this north doorway had an "ornamental carved and moulded oak screen with tracery headed panels filled with cathedral glass with lead cameo."

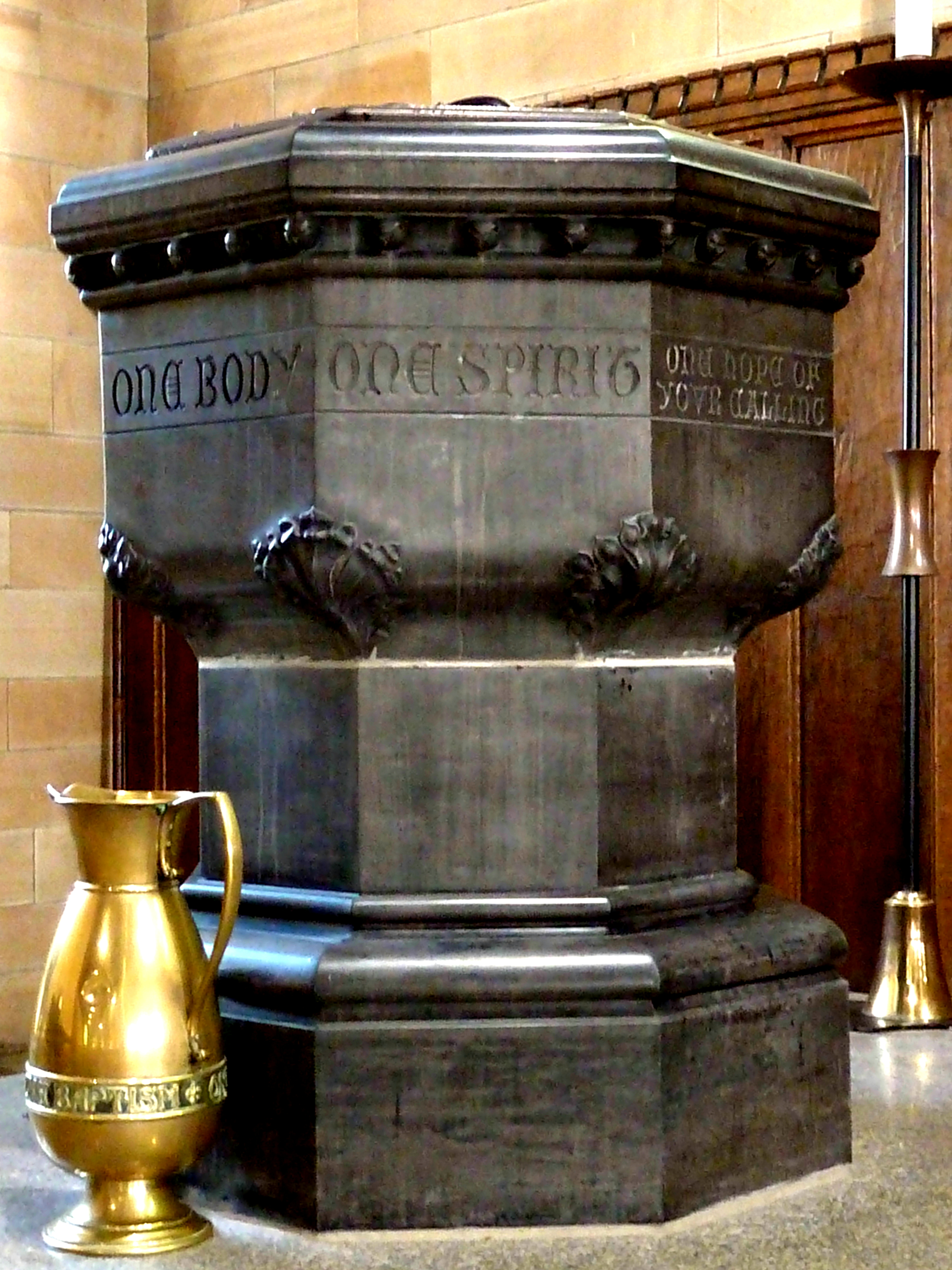
Black marble font designed by Barber

On the ground floor of the tower is the entrance, above that the organ chamber, then the ringing chamber, the clock chamber, the belfry, a stone gabled roof, and finally there was originally an "ornamental wrought iron cross." The Gothic Revival style was intended to mimic the style of the 14th century. There is carving at the entrances and at the tops of the chancel columns. The original east and west windows were by Charles Eamer Kempe. There was a reredos as wide as the chancel, and a pitch-pine interior roof. The nave was floored with wood block beneath the pews, and flagged in the aisles. John Thompson of Peterborough made the oak pews, pulpit and prayer desk, and the altar table in the nave and chancel. The octagonal font was of black marble, plainly carved and seated on two Dalbeattie granite steps. The church and all interior furnishings were designed and supervised by Barber, who was described in the Yorkshire Gazette as "Mr W. Swinden Barber, F.R.I.B.A. of Halifax, whose success as an ecclesiastical architect is so well known." The bells of St Paul's, made by Taylor of Loughborough and hung in 1882, were removed in 1998 to Charleston, South Carolina. The clock was made by William Potts of Leeds and installed in 1882; the autowind motor was installed by another company. (Note: For images of this building please see Commons category:St Paul's Church East Thorpe, Mirfield)

=== Extensions to King James Grammar School, Almondbury, 1880–83 ===
This is a Grade II listed building on St Helen's Gate at Almondbury, Huddersfield, West Yorkshire. However Barber's extensions to the structure are specifically not included in the listing. Barber added the south wing in 1880: it has a classroom, dormitory, master's room, kitchen, and bedrooms for domestic staff. In 1883 he added more rooms, possibly to the south wing. These were a schoolroom, classroom, dormitory and master's room. (Note: For images of this building please see Commons category:King James Grammar School, Almondbury)

=== Church of St James, Chapelthorpe, 1882 ===
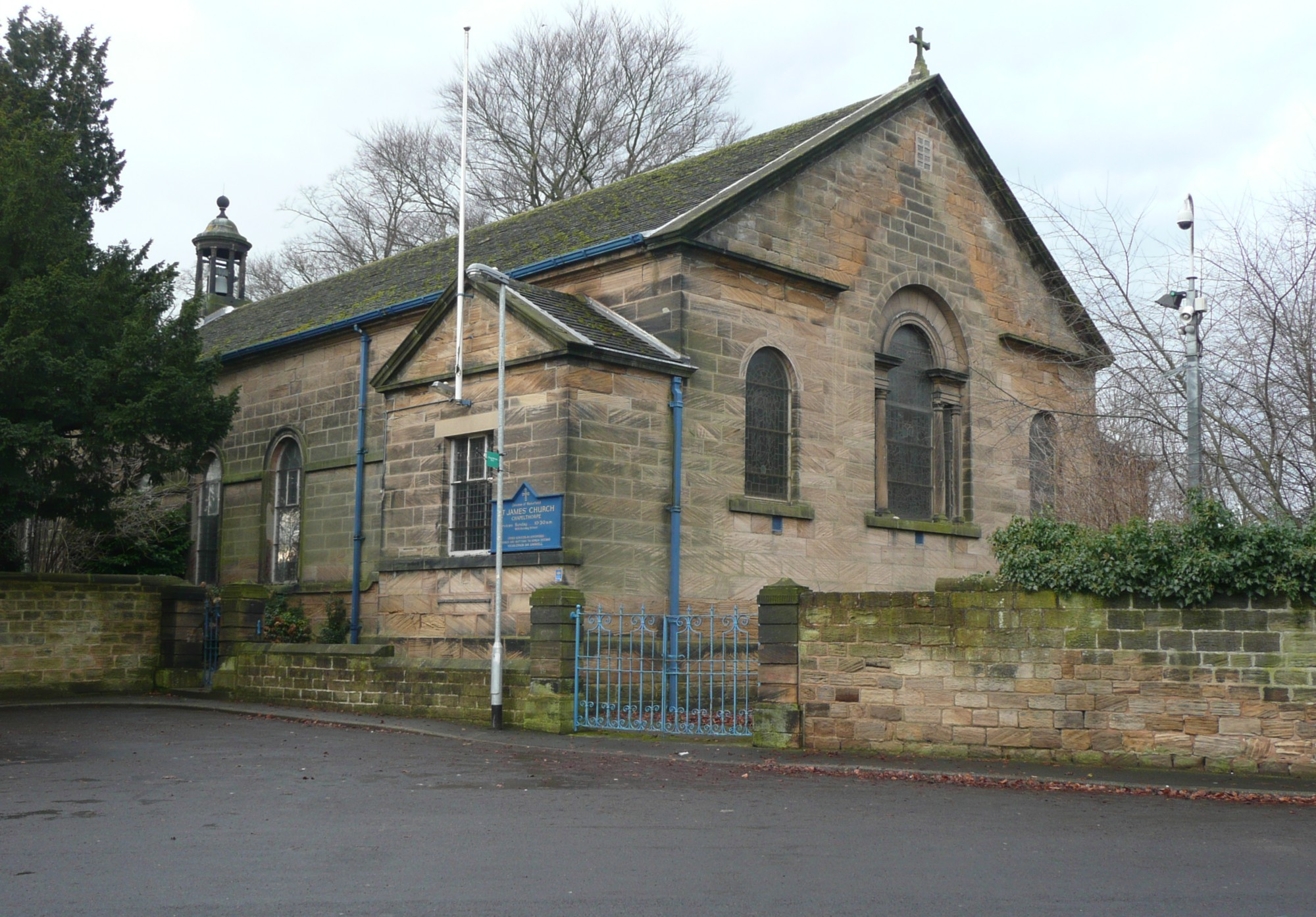
St James, Chapelthorpe

This is a Grade II listed building on Church Lane, Chapelthorpe, Wakefield, West Yorkshire WF4 3JG. The church had been built in 1771, and Barber enlarged it by adding the chancel and sanctuary in 1882. He replaced the pews and pulpit, and removed the gallery, reading desk and clerk's desk. Barber's chancel took up 178 square yards of the churchyard, and increased the interior length of the building to 94 feet (29 m). However the building burned down in 1951, and was rebuilt with the original 17th and 19th century stone walls and openings. Therefore, Barber's exterior survives, rebuilt with the same materials and to the same plan. It was Barber who noticed during the 1882 building work that one of the stones built into the east wall was of 13th-century origin, indicating the date of an earlier church on the site. (Note: For images of this building please see Commons category:Church of St James Chapelthorpe)

=== Church of St Michael and All Angels, East Ardsley, 1884 ===
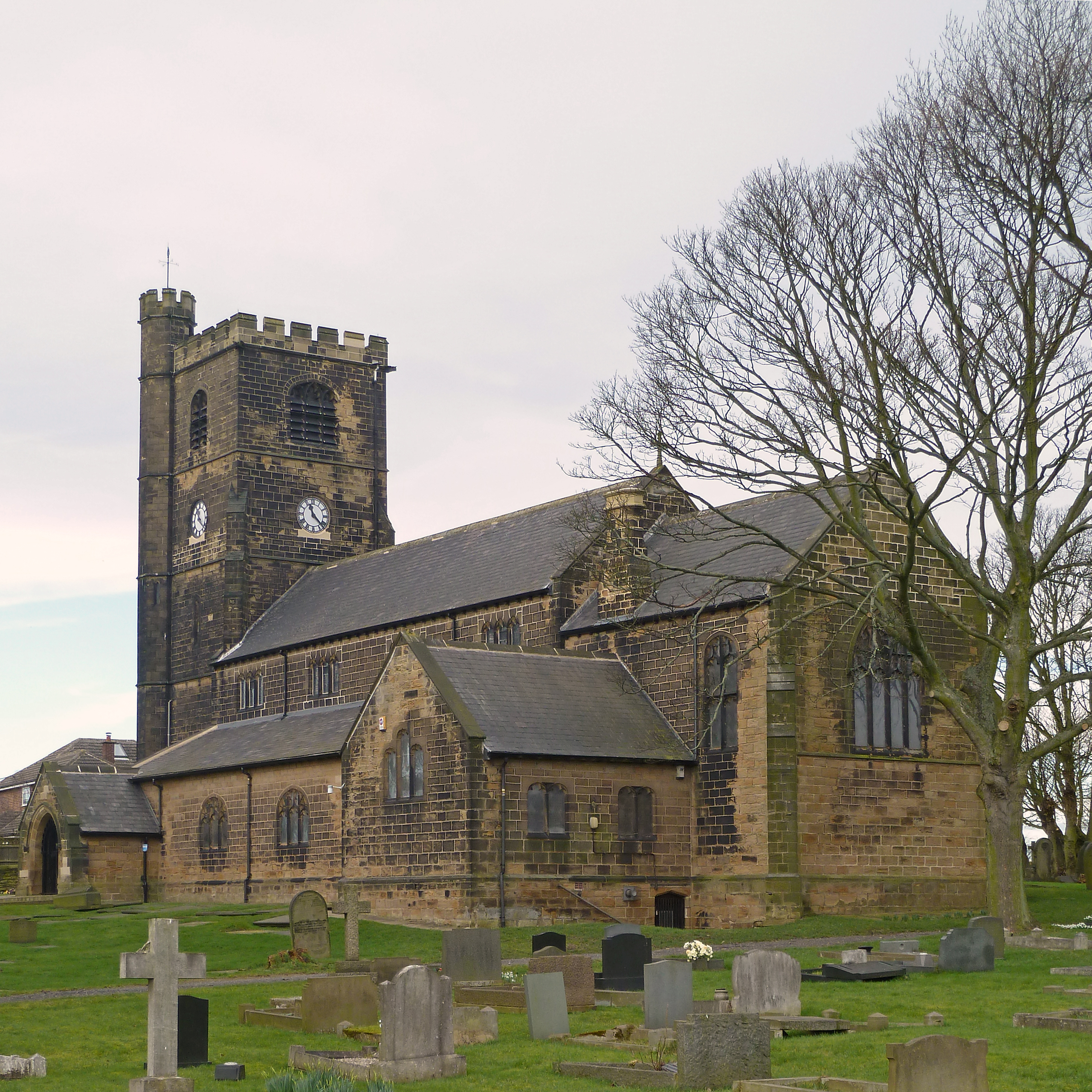
St Michael, East Ardley

This is a Grade II listed building. It is situated in Church Lane, East Ardsley near Wakefield, West Yorkshire, and was designed by Barber between 1880 and 1884 as a rebuild, using a Norman doorway from the previous church, which was a chapel of ease for the Church of St Mary at Woodkirk. St Mary's was owned by the 12th-century Nostell Priory (which now has a mansion of the same name on its site). The Perpendicular-style west tower is in four stages and has battlements, angle buttresses and an octagonal south-west exterior spiral staircase which goes up to a turret doorway onto the roof. Barber used "large, re-marked, punch-dressed stone" and supplemented it with Morley stone brought from Denton quarries. There are memorial windows by Heaton, Butler and Bayne. St Michael's contains some monuments and furnishings from the earlier church, for example there is a 1663 octagonal font, and in the vestry is 17th-century panelling made from box pews. As in some of Barber's other churches, the chancel has a lower roof than the nave. The tower contains eight bells. (Note: For images of this building please see Commons category:Church of St Michael and All Angels, East Ardsley, 1881)

=== Church of St Oswald, Filey, 1885 ===
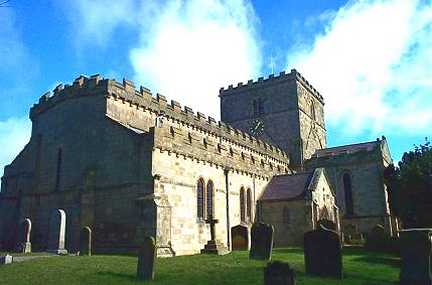
St Oswald, Filey

This is a Grade I listed building in Church Cliff Drive, Filey, Scarborough, the oldest parts of which were built in the twelfth to fifteenth centuries. Barber restored and partly rebuilt it in 1885, but the roof was fire-damaged in 1908 and had to be partly rebuilt. The extent of Barber's renovation is unknown, but the south porch and nave windows are his work. (Note: For images of this building please see Commons category:St. Oswald's church, Filey)

=== Church of St John the Divine, Menston, 1885 ===
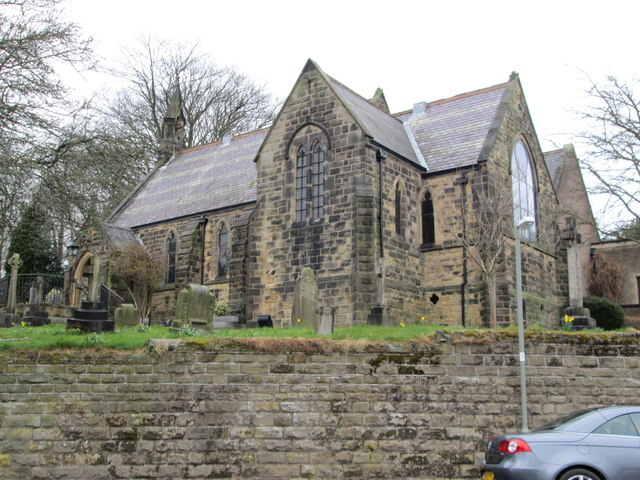
John the Divine, Menston

This was an enlargement by Barber consisting of a new north aisle and vestries for an existing 1871 church in Burley Lane, Menston, West Yorkshire. The plans were created in 1884–85 and the building was completed in 1886. There have been other additions since Barber's work. In 1890 an organ chamber was added, with an organ by I.W. Binns of Bramley; the organ has been rebuilt several times since then. In 1920 a reredos and panelling were installed in the sanctuary; the reredos has now been removed. In 1950 the organ was rebuilt, the pulpit moved and pews and other carved furniture such as pew ends, pulpit, lectern and baptistry screen were made by Thompson's of Kilburn. In 1970 a Lady chapel and two vestries were designed by architect Michael Ryley. There is a World War I memorial listing not just those who died, but all those who served in the war. This building is not listed. (Note: For images of this building please see Commons category:Church of St John the Divine, Menston)

=== Church of St Michael and All Angels, Beckwithshaw, 1886 ===
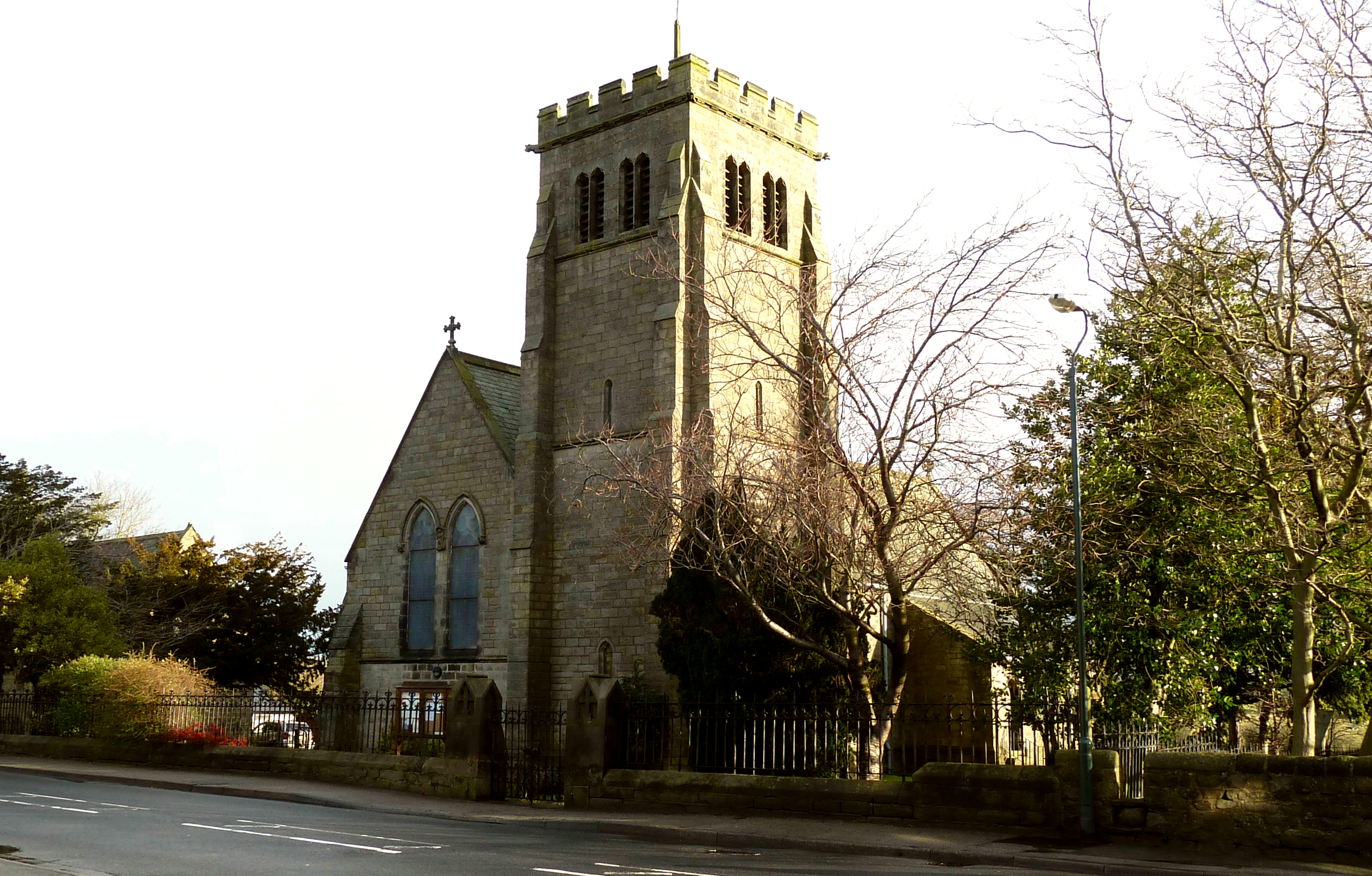
St Michael and All Angels, Beckwithshaw

In 1886 Barber designed Beckwithshaw Church, North Yorkshire. It is a Grade II listed building. It was consecrated on 29 September of that year by the Bishop of Ripon. It is substantial but simple, in Gothic Revival and Arts and Crafts style. It is furnished with its original carved reredos, pulpit and font by William Pashley, and stained glass windows by Charles Eamer Kempe. The floor is of decorative encaustic tiles, and there are six bells in the tower. There was originally a carved statue of St Michael overcoming the Dragon, possibly by William Pashley, but this is now missing. The church remains in use and apart from the missing statue is an example of Arts and Crafts architecture in pristine and unchanged condition. (Note: For images of this building please see Commons category:St Michael and All Angels Church, Beckwithshaw)

=== Church of St John the Evangelist, Cleckheaton, 1886 ===
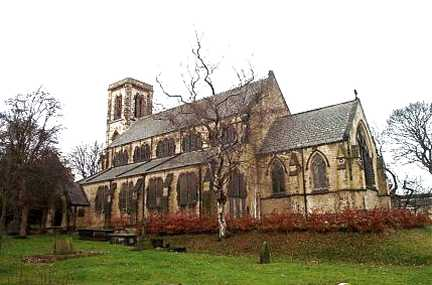
St John, Cleckheaton

This is a Grade II listed building at Church Street, Cleckheaton, West Yorkshire. The church was originally designed in 1830–32 by Peter Atkinson Junior, but only the tower of his building remains. Barber rebuilt the rest in 1886–88 in hammer-dressed stone. It has a five-bay nave with buttressed aisles, and the chancel has a further two bays. It has a south porch and a vestry wing to the chancel. The east window has five lights. The tower has three tiers and a south doorway. The tower used to have pinnacles, now gone. In the chancel there is a carved stone reredos of the Last Supper, date unknown. Barber drew earlier plans for this church in 1886, but these were rejected by the client for an unknown reason. No plans now exist for this project. (Note: For images of this building please see Commons category:St John the Evangelist, Cleckheaton)

=== Church of St Andrew, Stainland, 1887 ===
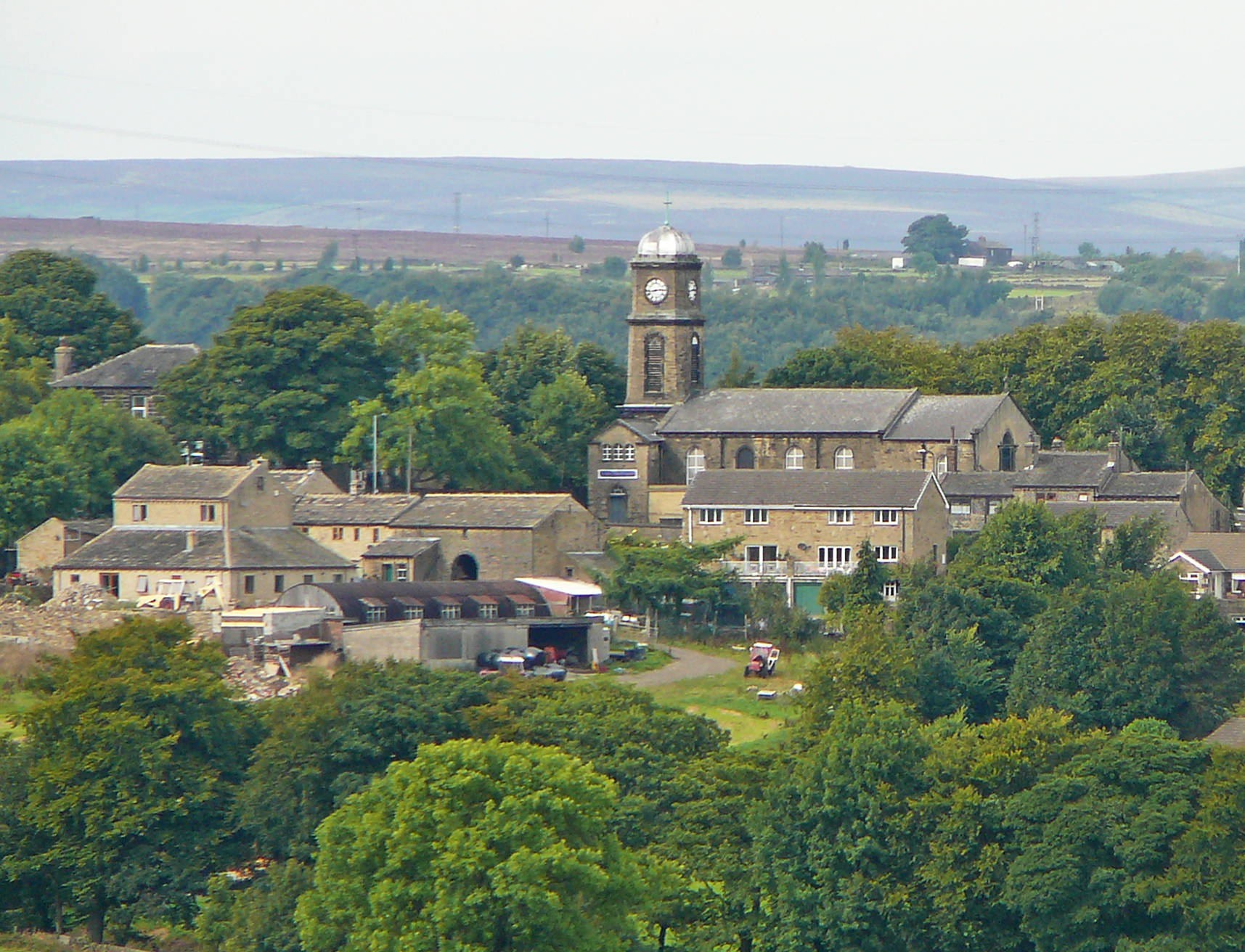
St Andrew, Stainland

This is a Grade II listed building, with the graveyard wall and railings also listed at Grade II. This church at Stainland Road, Stainland, Halifax, West Yorkshire, was rebuilt by architect Charles Child in 1839, using the remaining tower and north and south walls of the 1754 St Bartholomew's Chapel. It was consecrated in 1840 by the Bishop of Ripon. In 1887 Barber partly rebuilt and enlarged it. In 1898 a Harrison organ was installed in the church. Around 2008 the church had major alterations in which a large social area, toilets and kitchen facilities were placed at the rear of the church. (Note: For images of this building please see Commons category:Church of St Andrew, Stainland)

=== Church of St Mark, Old Leeds Road, 1887 ===
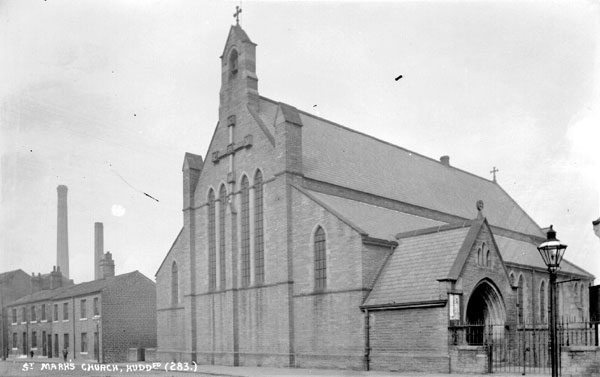
St Mark, Old Leeds Road, Huddersfield

The former Church of St Mark, Old Leeds Road, Huddersfield, was an Anglican parish church in West Yorkshire. It was designed in 1886 by Barber when the parish of St Peter's was split and a new building was required to accommodate a growing congregation. It was opened in 1887. Among the vicars posted in this benefice were the very popular Canon Percy Holbrook, the notoriously unfortunate Reverend Jonas Pilling who was involved in a standoff with his congregation for many years, the sociable Reverend Robert Alfred Humble who died in mysterious circumstances, and the eloquent preacher Reverend Joseph Miller, who had previously been a Congregational minister. (Note: For images of this building please see Commons category:St Mark's Old Leeds Road Huddersfield)

=== Church of St Jude, Savile Park, 1888 ===
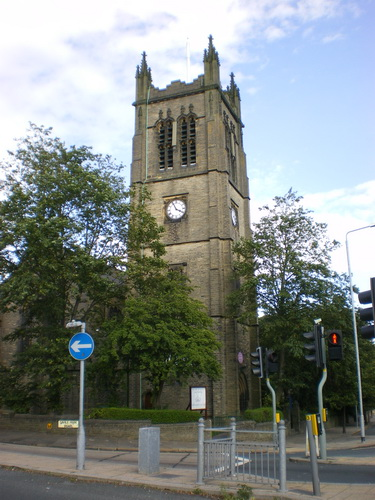
St Jude, Halifax

This is a Grade II listed building in Savile Park Road, Savile Park, Halifax, West Yorkshire. It was designed by Barber and ground broken in 1888, and the foundation stone was laid in May 1889, although it was not inscribed until the early 1900s. The tower is 89 feet (27 m) high to the pinnacles, and its design was exhibited at the Royal Academy of Arts. The building is 107 feet (33 m) long and 48 feet (15 m) wide. Barber's fees charged to the Building Committee included "coins for bottle in foundation stone." The building was funded by brothers John and William Baldwin who paid £8,400 in total including boundary walls. The church was consecrated on Thursday 13 November 1890 by Bishop Walsham How. The font was originally in the south-west corner (now moved to centre) and is carved out of Caen stone, with St Jude's symbol of a fishing boat; there is a similar symbol carved in the organ arch. The font has the original carved wooden cover which once featured a dove finial. However, much of the remaining interior has been redesigned since 1889, giving it a different appearance. For example, it had gas lighting, which was replaced with electric lighting in 1904. There was originally an organ by Abbott and Smith of Leeds, and this was renovated between 1932 and 1974. In spite of these and other interior changes, the English Heritage description says: "It is a large suburban church retaining its late C19 character, in a prominent position on the edge of Savile Park, where it makes an important contribution to the historical integrity of the local townscape. The interior preserves a traditional late C19 layout retaining nearly all of its original fixtures." (Note: For images of this building please see Commons category:St Jude's Church, Halifax)

=== Lodge at Shroggs Park, Halifax, 1892 ===
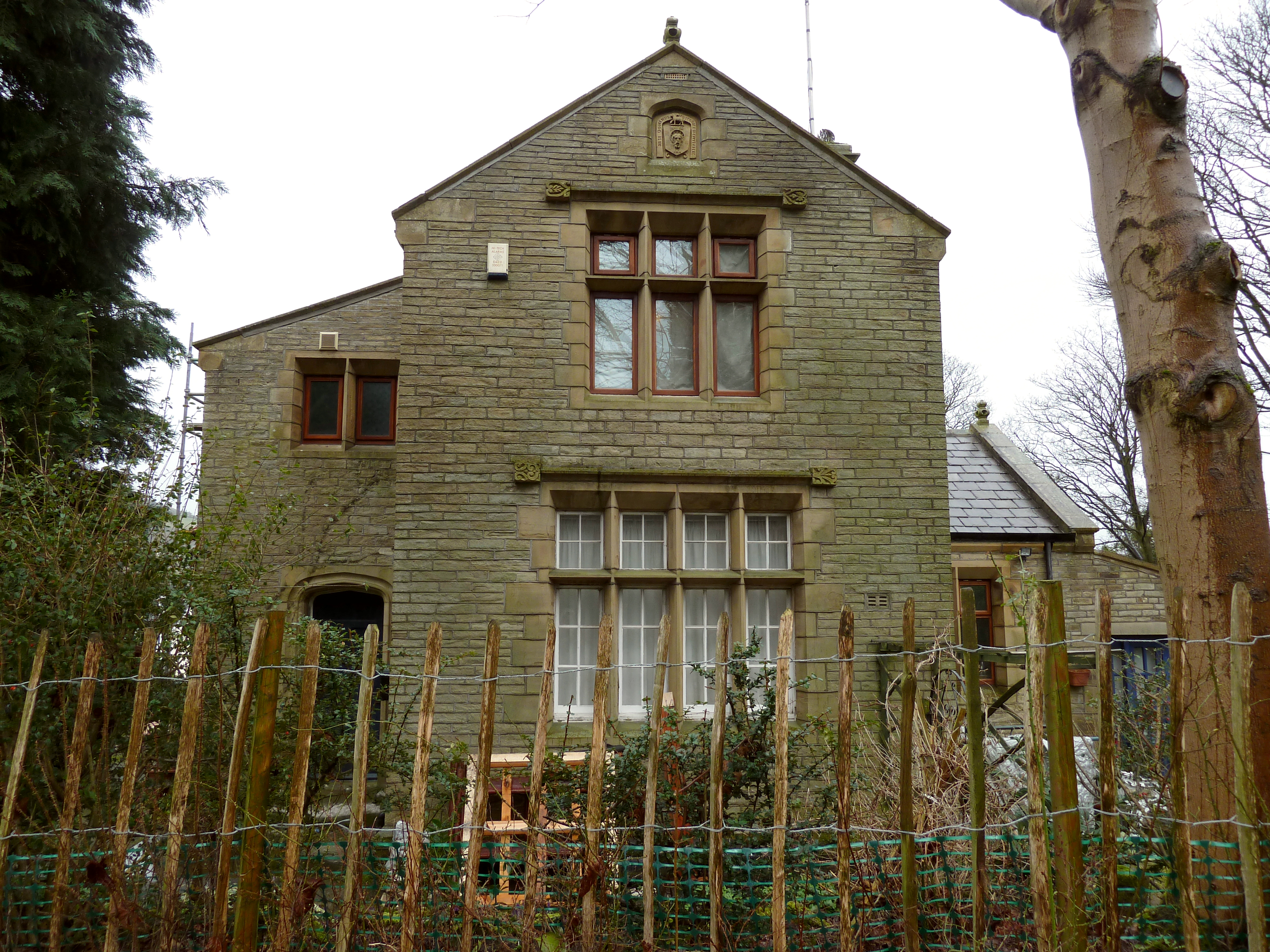
Shroggs Park Lodge

In 1892 Barber designed the lodge at the entrance to the park in Lee Mount Road, Halifax, after Edward Milner had designed the park in 1881. At the back of the lodge the date 1892 is carved on the wall under the gable. In a similar position at the front of the building is carved the coat of arms of Halifax. At some point in the 19th or 20th century the upper floor was lowered; it now obscures the interior tops of the ground floor windows. The upstairs rooms contain an original cast iron fireplace, and the remains of a hand-made Arts and Crafts engraved black slate fireplace, with cast-iron hood inlaid with red and black tiles. As of February 2014 the lodge, which is a private residence and is not listed, was under major renovation. (Note: For images of this building please see Commons category:Lodge at Shroggs Park, Halifax)

=== Church of St John the Divine, Calder Grove, 1892 ===
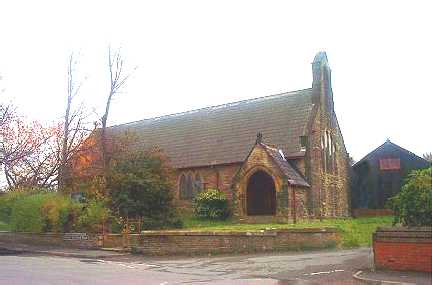
St John the Divine, Wakefield

This building is Grade II listed Barber designed St John the Divine at Denby Dale Road West, Calder Grove, Wakefield, West Yorkshire in 1892 at a building cost of £1,300, and it was consecrated by the Bishop of Wakefield on Tuesday 23 May 1893. The building was commissioned in memory of her husband John Mackie, JP, by Mrs Mary Mackie of New Mills, Derbyshire, who also commissioned St James the Less Church, designed by Barber in 1880. The two buildings are not dissimilar. The church is still in commission and has a pipe organ and a peg bell by Mears & Stainbank. The building was described as "a Mission church in the Early English style." It is built of Elland stone with Huddersfield stone dressing. The nave has an open-timberwork roof and is 50 feet (15 m) long. The chancel is 22 feet (6.7 m) long. The original pews were of stained and varnished red deal. The east window is a memorial to John Mackie. The congregation at the dedication service included Mrs Mackie, her brother in law and other relatives, people from "leading families in the locality "including Briggs, Thompson and Cartwright, and numerous local clergy." The building has a cut bench mark on the exterior north side. (Note: For images of this building please see Commons category:St John the Divine Church, Calder Grove)

=== Town Hall, Brighouse, 1898 ===
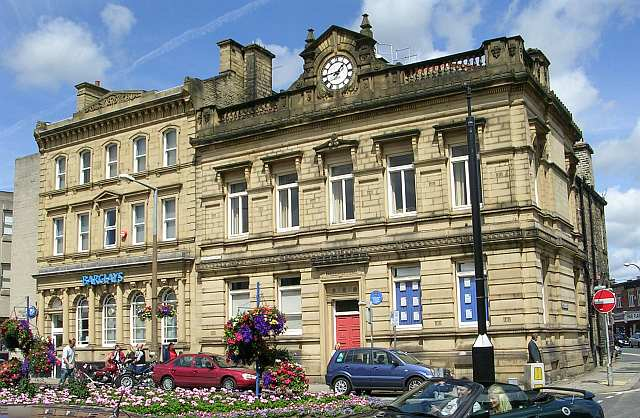
Town Hall, Brighouse

The town hall is a Grade II listed building In Thornton Square, Brighouse, West Yorkshire. This work was a development by Barber of the existing Town Hall at Brighouse, West Yorkshire. It was originally designed by John Lord junior as the Municipal Offices, to be used as an annexe to the old town hall (now the Civic Hall; see above). It opened on 16 March 1887. In 1898 Barber was employed to do more work of unknown nature on this building. One possibility is that he was connected in some way with the chairman's chair in the Council Chamber. It had a carved reredos in the style of the late 1890s, and Barber was known to have expertise in this type of piece. The Listing description describes it thus: "Chairman's chair has carved reredos behind with canopy over with pediment and drop finials." In 2010 the Council sold the property, the chairman's chair was dismantled, and there is now a dental practice in the building. (Note: For images of this building please see Commons category:Brighouse Town Hall)

=== Church of St Matthew, Primrose Hill, 1898–99 ===
Barber submitted plans for St Matthew mission church, Primrose Hill, Rashcliffe in Huddersfield, in 1898–99, but his submission was rejected. The church was eventually built in 1902 by an architect whose identity is not known.

== Undated works ==
=== Farfield House, Halifax, 1870s ===
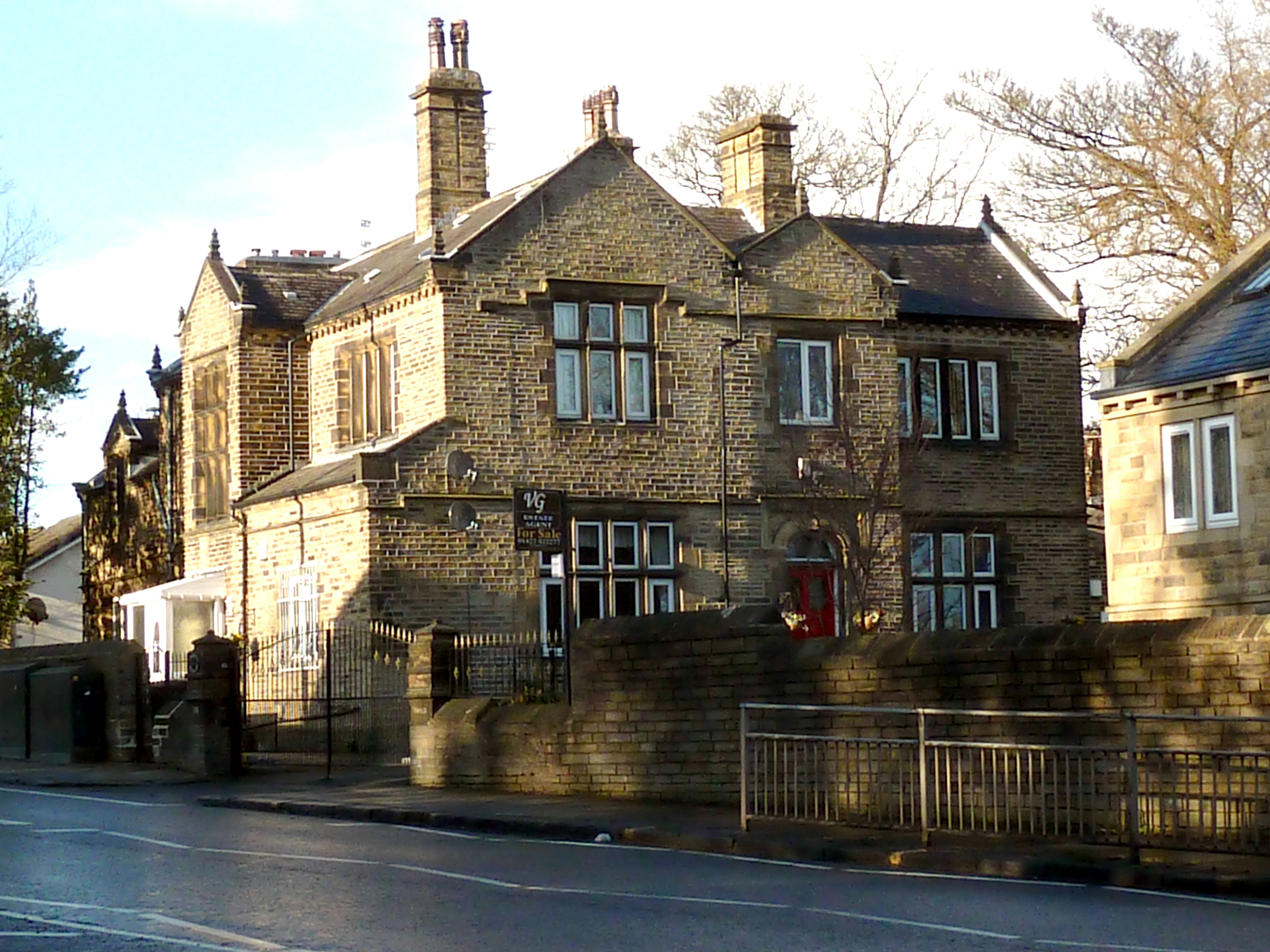
Farfield House

Barber designed this house for himself in the 1870s. It stands opposite the old Stafford Arms pub – now a restaurant – at 193 Huddersfield Road. As of 2014 it has been developed into apartments. Farfield House is a "large and prominent house" in a Conservation Area. (Note: For images of this building please see Commons category:Farfield House, Halifax)

== Bibliography ==
- Gregory, Barry (2006). A History of The Artists Rifles 1859–1947. Barnsley: Pen & Sword Books. ISBN 9781844155033.
- Felstead, Alison; Franklin, Jonathan; Pinfield, Leslie, eds. (1993). Directory of British Architects: 1834–1900. British Architectural Library: Mansell Pub. ISBN 9780720121582.
